= Law officers of the Crown =

Chief legal advisers to the Crown

The Law officers of the Crown are the senior legal advisers to His Majesty's Government of the United Kingdom and devolved governments of Northern Ireland (Northern Ireland Executive), Scotland (Scottish Government) and Wales (Welsh Government).

In the United Kingdom, Northern Ireland and Wales, they are commonly referred to as either the Attorney General, Solicitor General or Advocate General, depending on seniority – though other terms are also in use, such as the Counsel General for Wales, whilst in Scotland, the senior law officer is known as the Lord Advocate. Law officers in these roles are distinguished by being political appointees, while also being bound by the duties of independence, justice and confidentiality among the other typical professional commitments of lawyers. These roles do not have any direct oversight of prosecutions nor do they directly lead or influence criminal investigations. There are eight Law Offices in the United Kingdom, though not all serve the Westminster Government. The role of Attorney General for England and Wales and Advocate General for Northern Ireland has been held by Ellie Reeves since 20 July 2026, supported by the Solicitor General for England and Wales.

The Scottish Government has two law officers – the Lord Advocate and the Solicitor General for Scotland. The Lord Advocate is the most senior law officer in Scotland, and the chief legal adviser to the Scottish Government. Following devolution, a new position of Advocate General for Scotland was created to advise the UK Government on matters of Scots law over reserved matters only. The office of the Advocate General for Scotland should not be confused with that of "His Majesty's Advocate", which is the term used for the Lord Advocate in Scottish criminal proceedings as the head of the systems of prosecution in Scotland. The Welsh Government has its own law officer: the Counsel General for Wales; as does the Northern Irish executive: the Attorney General for Northern Ireland.

Each Crown Dependency has its own law officers to the Crown. Each British Overseas Territory, apart from the British Indian Ocean Territory, also has its own Attorney General. Many Commonwealth countries or those with a history of British colonisation retain these titles, though their particular roles and responsibilities may differ from the roles in the United Kingdom. The two Attorneys General for the Duchies of Lancaster and Cornwall are non-political appointments. They are not typically being referred to when the term law officer is used, as this tends to be reserved for political appointees.

== Law officers of the United Kingdom ==
=== England and Wales ===
The Attorney General for England and Wales, a member of the UK Government, is similarly the chief law officer of the Crown in England and Wales and advises and represents the Crown and government departments in court. By convention, and unlike the papers of other ministers, this legal advice is available to subsequent governments. In the second half of the 20th century it became unusual for the Attorney General to be formally a member of the Cabinet. Rather he/she would attend only when the Cabinet required legal advice.

The Attorney General oversees the small Attorney General's Office and also has responsibility for the Government Legal Department, which is headed by the Treasury Solicitor. In practice, the Treasury Solicitor (who also has the title of Procurator General) normally provides the lawyers or briefs Treasury Counsel to appear in court, although the Attorney General may appear in person. The person appointed to this role provides legal advice to the Government, acts as the representative of the public interest and resolves issues between government departments. The Government Legal Department provides advice to government departments, instructing independent counsel where necessary. The Attorney General is a barrister and can appear in court in person, though in practice he/she rarely does so, and then only in cases of outstanding national importance. In those cases the Government Legal Department provides his back-up. When appearing in court in person he/she is addressed by the judge as "Mr. Attorney".

The Attorney General also has supervisory powers over prosecutions, including those mounted by the Crown Prosecution Service, headed by the Director of Public Prosecutions; the Serious Fraud Office; and the Revenue and Customs Prosecutions Office. While the Attorney General is not personally involved with prosecutions, some prosecutions (e.g. rioting) cannot be commenced without their consent, and they generally have the power to halt prosecutions. Criminal prosecutions are the responsibility of the Crown Prosecution Service, headed by the Director of Public Prosecutions. The Attorney General may appeal cases to the higher courts where, although the particular case is settled, there may be a point of law of public importance at issue.

The Attorney General has public interest functions, being, for example, the trustee of default where a sole trustee has died, and can also take cases to the Supreme Court where points of general legal importance need to be settled.

The Attorney General's deputy is the Solicitor General for England and Wales. Under the Law Officers Act 1997, the Solicitor General may do anything on behalf of, or in the place of, the Attorney General, and vice versa.

=== Northern Ireland ===
Since the prorogation of the Parliament of Northern Ireland in 1972, the Attorney General for England and Wales was also Attorney General for Northern Ireland. The separate office of Attorney General for Northern Ireland was re-created alongside the new office of Advocate General for Northern Ireland upon the devolution of policing and justice powers to the Northern Ireland Assembly on 12 April 2010. As a result, these functions were split between:

- The Advocate General for Northern Ireland, who is the chief legal adviser to the UK Government on Northern Ireland law. The post is held by the Attorney General for England and Wales by virtue of office.
- The Attorney General for Northern Ireland, who is the chief legal adviser to the Northern Ireland Executive. John Larkin was appointed to that position on 24 May 2010 by the First Minister and deputy First Minister of Northern Ireland; the office has been held by Brenda King since 18 August 2020.

=== Scotland ===
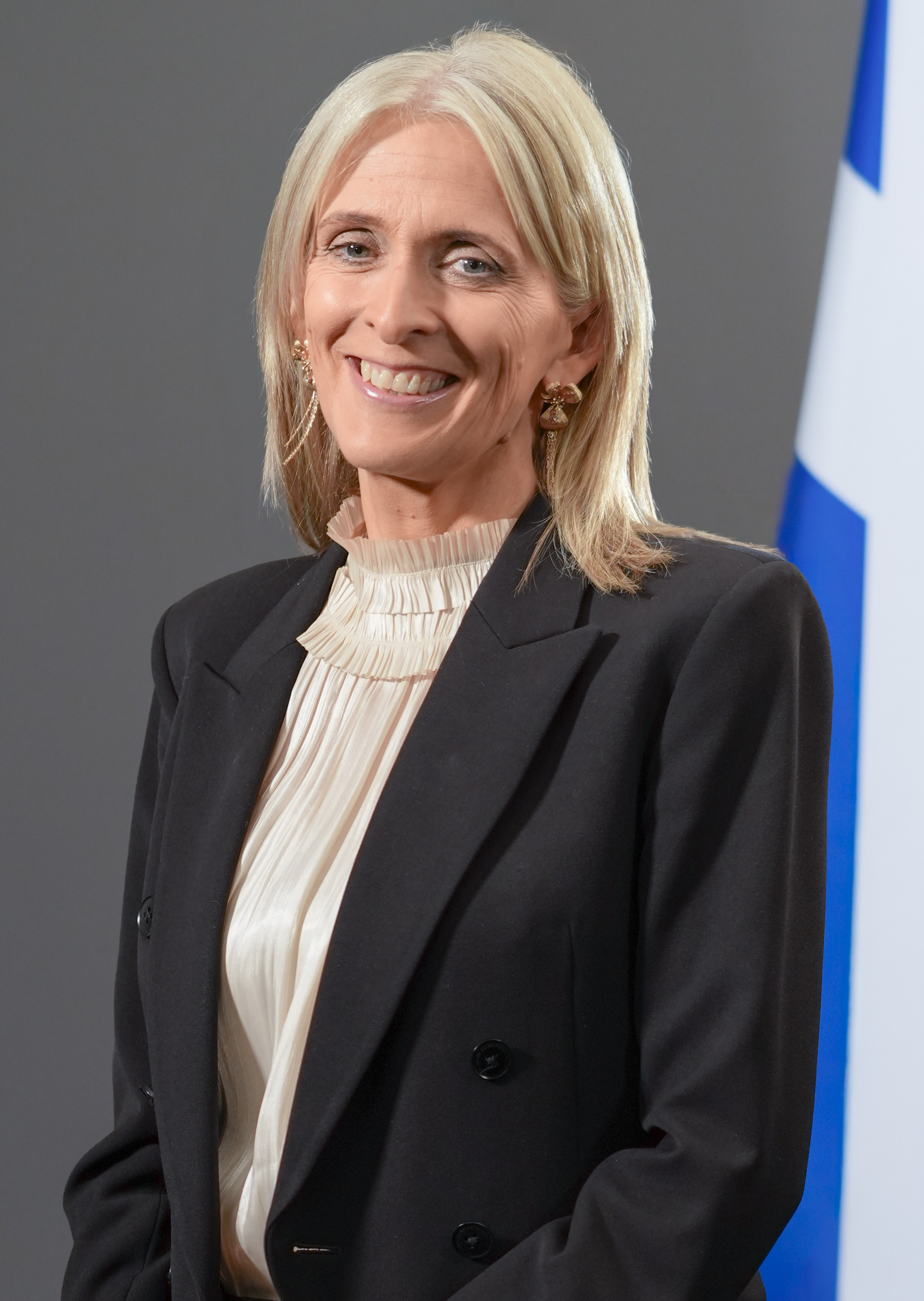
Ruth Charteris
Lord Advocate

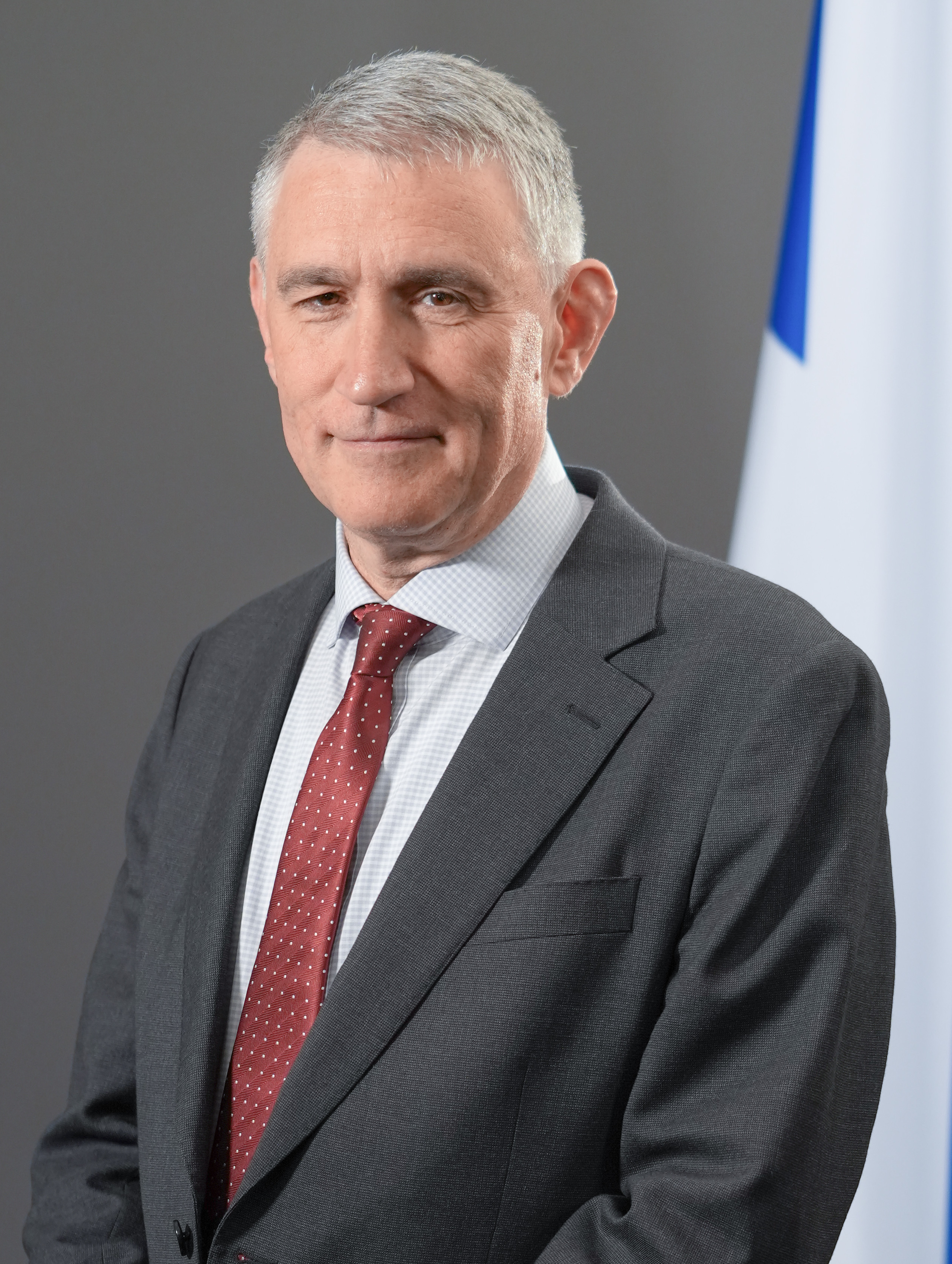
B. J. Gill
Solicitor General

==== Scotland Act 1998 ====
Under the 1999 constitutional reforms brought about by the Scotland Act 1998, the Lord Advocate has become the most senior law officer of the Scottish Government, acting as the chief legal adviser, as well as ultimately being responsible for the functioning of Scots law with all prosecutions on indictment in Scotland being conducted in the name of the Lord Advocate. The Lord Advocate does not attend Scottish cabinet meetings, however, they do see all cabinet papers and may be required to, along with the Solicitor General, attend cabinet meetings where the topic of discussion is relating to a matter of which the Lord Advocate and Solicitor General is responsible for, such as a specific legal aspect or the operations, functioning and funding of the Crown Office and Procurator Fiscal Service. Although not a member of the Scottish cabinet, the Lord Advocate is a member of the Cabinet Sub-Committee on Legislation, and contributes to the drafting, delivery and implementation of parliamentary bills and subsequent laws by way of attending Ministerial Bill Management Meetings. and The office holder of the post of Lord Advocate is the chief legal adviser to the Scottish Government and the crown in Scotland.

==== Lord Advocate ====
The Lord Advocate, held by Ruth Charteris, since 19 June 2026, heads the Crown Office and Procurator Fiscal Service and is the chief public prosecutor in Scotland. It is not within the powers of the Scottish Parliament to remove the incumbent Lord Advocate from their post as head of the systems of criminal prosecution and investigation of deaths. Like other law officers elsewhere in the United Kingdom, the Lord Advocate has a statutory duty in ensuring that all bills passed by the Scottish Parliament are within its legislative competence. The Lord Advocate has specific duties granted under the Scotland Act 1998 which allows them to investigate and resolve legal questions and concerns about the devolved powers of both the Scottish ministers and the Scottish Parliament.

The Lord Advocate is not head of the Faculty of Advocates; that position is held by the Dean of the Faculty of Advocates. The position of Lord Advocate is the most senior of the two Scottish law officers, and the Lord Advocate is a member of the Scottish Government. The Lord Advocate serves as the head of the criminal prosecution system and has sole responsibility for the investigation of deaths within Scotland. Additionally, the Lord Advocate is the sole, principal legal adviser to the Scottish Government and acts as the representative of the Scottish Government within civil proceedings and hearings. They have the power to refer a bill of the Scottish Parliament to the Supreme Court within the four week timeframe period to allow the Supreme Court to determine whether any aspect of a Scottish parliamentary bill or any associated provisions of a bill are out–with the legislative competence of the Scottish Parliament, should it be disputed by any member of either the Scottish Parliament, UK Parliament or any other Scottish or UK politician.

==== Solicitor General for Scotland ====
The Lord Advocate is assisted by the Solicitor General for Scotland, held by B. J. Gill, since 19 June 2026. The Solicitor General is the deputy to the Lord Advocate, and act as an assistant to the Lord Advocate undertaking their functions. As with the Lord Advocate, the Solicitor General is appointed by the monarch on the recommendation of the incumbent First Minister of Scotland. As well as supporting the Lord Advocate in the delivery of the Lord Advocate's functions, the Solicitor General may also exert their statutory and common law powers, where necessary. Both the Lord Advocate and Solicitor General for Scotland are independent from the Scottish Government and its ministers in connection to criminal prosecutions and death investigations within Scotland. The duty to act independently on matters from both the Scottish Government and Scottish ministers is recognised in Section 48(5) of the Scotland Act 1998.

==== Advocate General for Scotland ====
Meanwhile, the United Kingdom Government is advised on Scots law by the Advocate General for Scotland, and from 1707 to 1998, the Lord Advocate was the chief legal adviser of the British Government and the Crown on Scottish legal matters, both civil and criminal, until the Scotland Act 1998 devolved most domestic affairs to the Scottish Parliament. Since the re–establishment of the Scottish Parliament and Scottish Government in 1999, there has been a reduced role of the British Government in Scots law. The office of Advocate to the monarch is an ancient one, pre–dating the Treaty of Union 1707 and existed in the pre–union Kingdom of Scotland. The first recorded Lord Advocate was Sir John Ross of Montgrenan, who is formally mentioned in 1483. At this time the post was generally called the King's Advocate and only in the year 1573 was the term "Lord Advocate" first used.

=== Wales ===
Under the Government of Wales Act 2006, the Counsel General for Wales is the chief legal adviser to, and a member of, the Welsh Government.

== Non-political attorneys general ==
Some subjects are entitled to have an attorney general; these include a queen consort and the Prince of Wales, who has an Attorney General for the Duchy of Cornwall. There is also an Attorney-General of the Duchy of Lancaster, which is a mostly landed inheritance that is held by the Crown (in trust for the monarch) and administered independently of the monarch under the supervision of a government minister, the Chancellor of the Duchy of Lancaster.

== Defunct legal offices ==
Before the establishment of the Irish Free State in 1922, the legal advisers to the Crown in the Courts of Ireland were the Attorney-General for Ireland and the Solicitor-General for Ireland. These offices became redundant in 1921.

The Crown also had a legal adviser for the High Court of Admiralty, known as the Admiralty Advocate, but this office lapsed in 1875 when the Admiralty Court became part of the Probate, Divorce and Admiralty Division of the High Court of Justice.

The Crown's representative in the ecclesiastical courts of England was the King's Advocate (or Queen's Advocate when the monarch was female). This office has been vacant since the resignation of its last holder in 1872.

Though not defunct, the Judge-Advocate General was ranked among the law officers until the beginning of the 19th century.

== Current law officers of the Crown ==
=== Governments in the United Kingdom ===
Office	Name	Start
Government of the United Kingdom
Attorney General for England and Wales; Advocate General for Northern Ireland	Ellie Reeves	20 July 2026
Solicitor General for England and Wales	Andy Slaughter	21 July 2026
Advocate General for Scotland	Catherine Smith, Baroness Smith of Cluny	29 August 2024
Scottish Government
Lord Advocate	Ruth Charteris	19 June 2026
Solicitor General for Scotland	B. J. Gill	19 June 2026
Welsh Government
Counsel General for Wales	Elfyn Llwyd	12 May 2026
Northern Ireland Executive
Attorney General for Northern Ireland	Dame Brenda King	18 August 2020

=== Governments of the Crown Dependencies ===
Office	Name	Start
States of Guernsey
Procureur; Receiver General	Megan Pullum	2016
Comptroller	Robert Titterington	2016
Government of Jersey
Attorney General	Matthew Jowitt	2 March 2026
Solicitor General	Victoria Bell	19 June 2026
Isle of Man Government
Attorney General	Walter Wannenburgh	3 September 2022
Solicitor General	Elizabeth Smith	30 March 2023

=== Royal family ===
Office	Name	Start
Attorney General of the Duchy of Lancaster	Sonia Tolaney	30 October 2020
Attorney General of the Duchy of Cornwall	Sharif Shivji	December 2020

== Attorneys General of the British Overseas Territories ==
Flag	Arms	Territory	Name
		Anguilla	Dwight Horsford, Attorney General of Anguilla
		Bermuda	Kathy Lynn Simmonds, Attorney General of Bermuda
		British Antarctic Territory	James Woods, Attorney General British Antarctic Territory
		British Indian Ocean Territory	N/A – the territory is administered from London. Paul Candler is HM Commissioner for the British Indian Ocean Territory
		British Virgin Islands	Dawn J Smith, Attorney General of the British Virgin Islands
		Cayman Islands	Samuel W. Bulgin, Attorney General of the Cayman Islands
		Falkland Islands	Simon Young, Joint Attorney General of South Georgia and the South Sandwich Islands, and the Falkland Islands
		Gibraltar	Michael Llamas, Attorney General of Gibraltar
		Montserrat	Sheree Jemmotte-Rodney, Attorney General of Montserrat
		Pitcairn, Henderson, Ducie and Oeno Islands	Simon Mount, Attorney General of Pitcairn, Henderson, Ducie and Oeno Islands.
		Saint Helena, Ascension and Tristan da Cunha, including:	Allen Cansick, Attorney General for Saint Helena, Ascension and Tristan da Cunha.
		Saint Helena	
		Ascension Island	
		Tristan da Cunha	
		South Georgia and the South Sandwich Islands	Simon Young, Joint Attorney General of South Georgia and the South Sandwich Islands, and the Falkland Islands
		Sovereign Base Areas of Akrotiri and Dhekelia	Louise Pieros, Attorney General and Legal Advisor of the Sovereign Base Areas of Akrotiri and Dhekelia
		Turks and Caicos Islands	Rhondalee Moreen Braithwaite-Knowles, Attorney General of the Turks and Caicos Islands
