= Law Officers Act 1997 =

Act of the Parliament of the United Kingdom

Law Officers Act 1997 (Note: Section 3(1).)
- Act of Parliament
- Parliament of the United Kingdom
- Long title: An Act to enable functions of the Attorney General and of the Attorney General for Northern Ireland to be exercised by the Solicitor General; and for connected purposes.
- Citation: 1997 c. 60
- Introduced by: John Morris, Attorney General (Commons); Lord Falconer of Thoroton, Solicitor General (Note: Introduced on his behalf by Lord Carter.) (Lords)
- Territorial extent: United Kingdom (Note: Section 3(5).)

Dates
- Royal assent: 31 July 1997
- Commencement: 31 September 1997 (Note: Section 3(3).)

Other legislation
- Amends: Metropolitan Police Act 1839; Newspapers, Printers, and Reading Rooms Repeal Act 1869; Explosive Substances Act 1883; Prevention of Corruption Act 1906; Public Order Act 1936
- Amended by: Justice (Northern Ireland) Act 2002

Status: Amended

History of passage through Parliament

Text of statute as originally enacted

Text of the Law Officers Act 1997 as in force today (including any amendments) within the United Kingdom, from legislation.gov.uk.

The Law Officers Act 1997 (c. 60) is an act of the Parliament of the United Kingdom which allows the Solicitor General for England and Wales to exercise the powers of the Attorney General for England and Wales or the Advocate General for Northern Ireland (ex-officio the Attorney General) without the Attorney General needing to explicitly authorise the Solicitor General or for an enactment to separately grant powers to them. This act effectively makes the Solicitor General an agent of the Attorney General.

== Background ==
Under the Law Officers Act 1944 or the Northern Ireland Constitution Act 1973, the Solicitor General was able to exercise the powers of the Attorney General in limited circumstances. Section 1(1) of the 1944 act provided:

(1) Any functions authorised or required, by any enactment to which this subsection applies, to be discharged by the Attorney General may be discharged by the Solicitor General, if—

(a) the office of Attorney General is vacant; or

(b) the Attorney General is unable to act owing to absence or illness; or

(c) the Attorney General authorises the Solicitor General to act in any particular case.

Section 10 of the 1973 act as enacted has analogous provision. This authorisation was however limited to enactments which either were passed before the 1944 act and which made no provision as to the Solicitor General, or for Acts passed after which did not expressly exclude the section. Otherwise, the Solicitor General could be granted powers in their own right.

The act was introduced on 10 June 1997 by the then-Solicitor General, the Lord Falconer of Thoroton. In his maiden speech to the House of Lords on 16 June, who stated that the position which existed at that time had "significant practical and legal shortcomings" and that the act would "permit [the Attorney General] who is in charge of the department and his successors to run the department in a sensible and efficient manner, using the Solicitor-General to the full, without the need for specific delegation". John Morris, the then-Attorney General, called the legal position as "needlessly bureaucratic" when he introduced the act on 24 July in the House of Commons, with the Shadow Attorney General, Nicholas Lyell, welcoming it - saying that it "enables the Attorney-General and the Solicitor-General to work together more efficiently and, where necessary, interchangeably".

The act does not change the Attorney General from being the principal law officer.

The act was passed by both Houses without a division on 7 July (House of Lords) and 24 July (House of Commons), owing to its uncontroversial and technical nature.

== Overview ==
=== Section 1 ===
This section allows the Solicitor General to exercise the powers of the Attorney General in the Attorney General's name, allowing delegation of powers.

=== Section 2 ===
This section effectively extends Section 1's provisions to Northern Ireland. Since 2010, the Attorney General for England and Wales is the Advocate General for Northern Ireland, and these provisions have been exercised by them.

=== Section 3 and Schedule ===
Section 3 repeals parts of enactments in the Schedule and sets a date for the act to commence. The Schedule contains provisions which explicitly granted the Solicitor General powers of the Attorney General, as well as now-redundant provisions.

== See also ==
- Attorney General for England and Wales
- Advocate General for Northern Ireland
- Solicitor General for England and Wales
- Law of the United Kingdom
