= Intertrade =

Intertrade may refer to:

- InterTradeIreland
- Intertrade UK
- Naftiran Intertrade
