= Attorney General for Northern Ireland =

Northern Ireland Attorney General for Northern Ireland
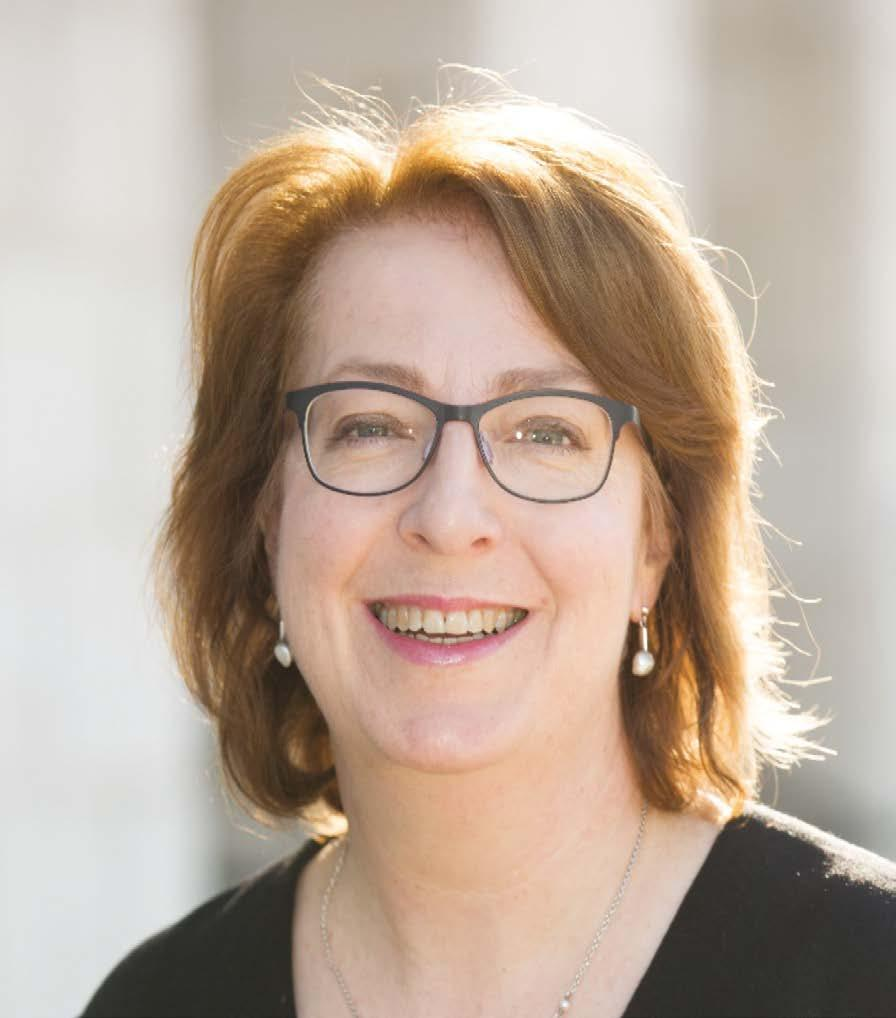
- Incumbent; Dame Brenda King since 18 August 2020
- Office of the Attorney General for Northern Ireland
- Style: Attorney General (informal)
- Member of: Executive Committee (attending)
- Reports to: Northern Ireland Assembly
- Appointer: First Minister and deputy First Minister; (acting jointly)
- Term length: Five years, renewable
- Formation: 1921
- First holder: Richard Best
- Deputy: Solicitor to the Attorney General
- Salary: Over £250,000 per annum (2026)
- Website: www.attorneygeneralni.gov.uk

The Attorney General for Northern Ireland is the chief legal adviser to the Northern Ireland Executive for both civil and criminal matters that fall within the devolved powers of the Northern Ireland Assembly. The Attorney General for Northern Ireland is also responsible for appointing the director and deputy director of the Public Prosecution Service for Northern Ireland.

== History ==
The original post was formed in 1921 with the establishment of the Parliament of Northern Ireland and was always held by an Ulster Unionist Party MP. A Deputy Attorney General briefly held office in 1946, when the post was held by Edmond Warnock MP (21 June – 11 September).

The Attorney General for England and Wales performed the role of Attorney General for Northern Ireland after the prorogation of the Parliament of Northern Ireland in 1972. These office-holders were always United Kingdom Government Ministers.

Justice powers were again devolved to the Northern Ireland Assembly on 12 April 2010, at which point the Attorney General for England and Wales ceased to hold office as Attorney General of Northern Ireland. She instead became Advocate General for Northern Ireland and a vacancy occurred. John Larkin QC became the first politically independent office-holder, taking office on 24 May 2010, when he was appointed by First Minister Peter Robinson and Deputy First Minister Martin McGuinness.

The role and powers of the Attorney General for Northern Ireland are provided in the Justice (Northern Ireland) Act 2002. The Attorney General is appointed for a term of not more than five years jointly by the First Minister and Deputy First Minister of Northern Ireland. The Attorney General is permitted to participate in the proceedings of the Assembly, but not to vote.

== Office-holders ==
=== Devolved government 1921–1972 ===
Colour key (for political parties):
Ulster Unionist

Name	Portrait	Term of office		Political party	Prime Minister (NI)
Richard Best MP		7 June 1921	5 November 1925	Ulster Unionist	Sir James Craig
Anthony Babington MP		5 November 1925	3 December 1937	Ulster Unionist	Sir James Craig
Edward Sullivan Murphy MP		3 December 1937	14 April 1939	Ulster Unionist	Sir James Craig
Arthur Black MP		14 April 1939	10 November 1941	Ulster Unionist	Sir James Craig
Arthur Black MP		14 April 1939	10 November 1941	Ulster Unionist	J. M. Andrews
John MacDermott MP		10 November 1941	3 November 1944	Ulster Unionist	J. M. Andrews
John MacDermott MP		10 November 1941	3 November 1944	Ulster Unionist	Sir Basil Brooke
William Lowry MP		3 November 1944	6 June 1947	Ulster Unionist	Sir Basil Brooke
Lancelot Curran MP		6 June 1947	4 November 1949	Ulster Unionist	Sir Basil Brooke
Edmond Warnock MP		4 November 1949	14 April 1956	Ulster Unionist	Sir Basil Brooke
Brian Maginess MP		14 April 1956	20 March 1964	Ulster Unionist	Sir Basil Brooke
Brian Maginess MP		14 April 1956	20 March 1964	Ulster Unionist	Terence O'Neill
Edward Warburton Jones MP		20 March 1964	1 March 1968	Ulster Unionist	Terence O'Neill
Basil Kelly MP		11 March 1968	30 March 1972	Ulster Unionist	Terence O'Neill
Basil Kelly MP		11 March 1968	30 March 1972	Ulster Unionist	James Chichester-Clark
Basil Kelly MP		11 March 1968	30 March 1972	Ulster Unionist	Brian Faulkner

=== Direct rule 1972–2010 ===
Colour key (for political parties):
Conservative Labour

Name	Portrait	Term of office		Political party	Prime Minister (UK)
Sir Peter Rawlinson MP		30 March 1972	4 March 1974	Conservative	Edward Heath
Samuel Silkin MP		7 March 1974	4 May 1979	Labour	Harold Wilson
Samuel Silkin MP		7 March 1974	4 May 1979	Labour	James Callaghan
Sir Michael Havers MP		6 May 1979	13 June 1987	Conservative	Margaret Thatcher
Sir Patrick Mayhew MP		13 June 1987	10 April 1992	Conservative	Margaret Thatcher
Sir Patrick Mayhew MP		13 June 1987	10 April 1992	Conservative	John Major
Sir Nicholas Lyell MP		10 April 1992	2 May 1997	Conservative	John Major
Sir John Morris MP		6 May 1997	29 July 1999	Labour	Tony Blair
Lord Williams of Mostyn		29 July 1999	11 June 2001	Labour	Tony Blair
Lord Goldsmith		11 June 2001	27 June 2007	Labour	Tony Blair
Baroness Scotland of Asthal		27 June 2007	12 April 2010	Labour	Gordon Brown

=== Devolved government 2010–present ===
Colour key (for political parties):
None Democratic Unionist Party Sinn Féin

Name	Portrait	Term of office		Political party	First Minister and Deputy First Minister	
John Larkin QC		24 May 2010	30 Jun 2020	None	Peter Robinson	Martin McGuinness
John Larkin QC		24 May 2010	30 Jun 2020	None	Arlene Foster	Martin McGuinness
Brenda King		30 June 2020	Incumbent	None	Arlene Foster	Michelle O'Neill
Brenda King		30 June 2020	Incumbent	None	Paul Givan	Michelle O'Neill
Brenda King		30 June 2020	Incumbent	None	Michelle O'Neill	Emma Little-Pengelly

== See also ==
- Law Officers of the Crown
- Advocate General for Northern Ireland
- Attorney General for England and Wales
- Department of Justice (Northern Ireland)
- Executive Office (Northern Ireland)
