= Albert Redhead =

Grenadian lawyer and judge (died 2019)

Albert Redhead (c. 1938 – March 4, 2019) was a Grenadian lawyer and judge who worked in many of the Commonwealth countries of the Caribbean.

== Early life ==
Redhead received a Bachelor of Laws degree from the University of London in 1971, and in 1972 was called to the bar of England and Wales by the Middle Temple.

In 1974, Redhead moved to Saint Kitts and Nevis, where he began working as a Crown Counsel. In 1975, he became Registrar of the Saint Kitts and Nevis courts and also served as a magistrate of the courts. In 1980, he became the Director of Public Prosecutions for Saint Kitts and Nevis.

In 1985, the Judicial and Legal Services Commission of the Caribbean Community appointed Redhead to be a High Court Judge of the Eastern Caribbean Supreme Court. In 1997, he became an Appeals Court Judge of the same court. Since retiring from the Court in 2003, he was twice re-appointed as an Acting High Court Judge of the Court: from 2004 to 2006 and he was again appointed in 2007.

As a High Court Judge, Redhead was assigned to reside in and hear cases from a number of countries, including Saint Kitts and Nevis, Montserrat, Anguilla, and Saint Lucia. His most recent appointment was to reside in and hear cases from the British Virgin Islands.

In 2016, he retired from the role of judge at the High Court in Brades, and was honored by Hon. Sheree Jemmotte-Rodney.

Redhead died on March 4, 2019, at the age of 80 in Antigua and Barbuda.
