= Attorney General of Montserrat =

- Incumbent; Sheree Jemmotte-Rodney
- Attorney General's Chambers
- Appointer: The governor on advice of the premier
- Website: https://www.agc.gov.ms

The attorney general of Montserrat is the chief legal adviser to The Crown and the Government of Montserrat. In addition to providing legal advice to government departments and various statutory boards, the Office of the Attorney General is responsible for the drafting of all of the government's legislation, and also handles all civil litigation matters for the government.

As of 2019, Sheree Jemmotte-Rodney became the attorney general of Montserrat, a position she had been acting in for more than a year.

Attorney General of Montserrat (Incomplete Table)
Name	Term
John Stanley Weekes	c. 1980
Michael J. Bradley	c. 1981-1982
Odel Adams	c. 1984-1990
Stanley Moore	c. 1990-1992
Gertel Thom	c. 1993–1998
Charles Ekins	c. 1998–2000
Brian Cottle	c. 2000–2002
Charles Ekins	c. 2002
Esco Henry	c. 2002–2005
Eugene Otuonye	c. 2006–2007
James Wood	c. 2007–2010
Esco Henry	c. 2011–2014
Keith Friday	c. 2014–2016
Sheree Jemmotte-Rodney	2016–present

Sir Clare Roberts, who served as the attorney general for the British Virgin Islands and Antigua and Barbuda, has been identified as a former attorney general of Montserrat. His years of service are uncertain.

While Gertel Thom has been identified as the first female attorney-general of Antigua and Barbuda (1998–2001), it is unknown if she was also the first in Montserrat's history.

== See also ==
- Justice ministry
- Politics of Montserrat
