= Brenda King =

Attorney General for Northern Ireland since 2020

Dame Brenda King DCB
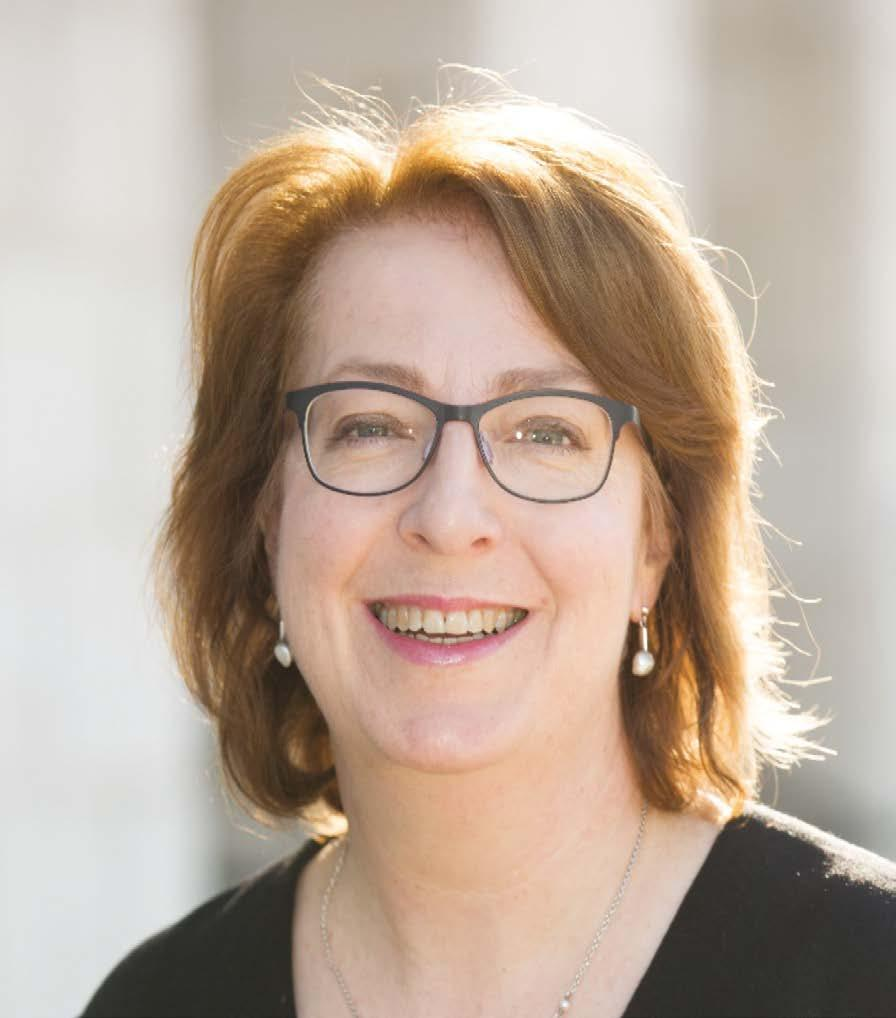

Attorney General for Northern Ireland
- Incumbent
- Assumed office 18 August 2020
- First Minister: Arlene Foster; Paul Givan; Michelle O'Neill
- Deputy First Minister: Michelle O'Neill; Emma Little-Pengelly
- Preceded by: John Larkin

Personal details
- Born: Brenda Mary King; June 13, 1964 (age 62) Belfast, Northern Ireland
- Party: Independent
- Spouse: James Sullivan
- Education: Queen's University Belfast; University of South Carolina; University of Cambridge
- Profession: Solicitor; Parliamentary Counsel; Diplomat

Dame Brenda Mary Sullivan DCB (née King; born 13 June 1964 in Belfast) is the Attorney General for Northern Ireland. Prior to her appointment in 2020, King was First Legislative Counsel in Executive Office, leading the specialist office responsible for the drafting of Northern Ireland Assembly Bills.

She is the second, and second successive holder of the office not to be a politician sitting in either the Parliament of Northern Ireland, at Stormont, or the UK Parliament and the first to be appointed directly from the Civil Service.

== Career ==
Educated at Queen's University of Belfast and graduating in law in 1986, with further education at the University of South Carolina and the University of Cambridge, King started her career in private practice as a solicitor, qualified in both Northern Ireland and the Republic of Ireland, before she moved into the civil service, becoming the Executive's chief legislative adviser in 2012. She had previously spent time as a diplomat – including a period in Gibraltar – dealing principally with EU and public international law.

She is a former president of the Commonwealth Association of Legislative Counsel (2017–19), which involved working with lawyers in 92 jurisdictions to improve the quality of legislation in Commonwealth jurisdictions broadly sharing similar common law traditions of lawmaking.

== Appointment ==
King was appointed Attorney General, initially on an interim basis, to succeed John Larkin QC, who stepped down in June 2020 after serving in the post for 10 years. She was sworn in August 2020 at the Royal Courts of Justice in Belfast, formally taking office as chief legal adviser to the Stormont Executive at a ceremony overseen by Lord Chief Justice Sir Declan Morgan.

King was appointed Dame Commander of the Order of the Bath (DCB) in the 2021 Birthday Honours for services to constitutional law.

Political offices
Preceded by John Larkin	Attorney General for Northern Ireland; 2020–	Incumbent
