= Patricia Scotland =

Dominican-British barrister and politician (born 1955)

The Right Honourable The Baroness Scotland of Asthal PC KC
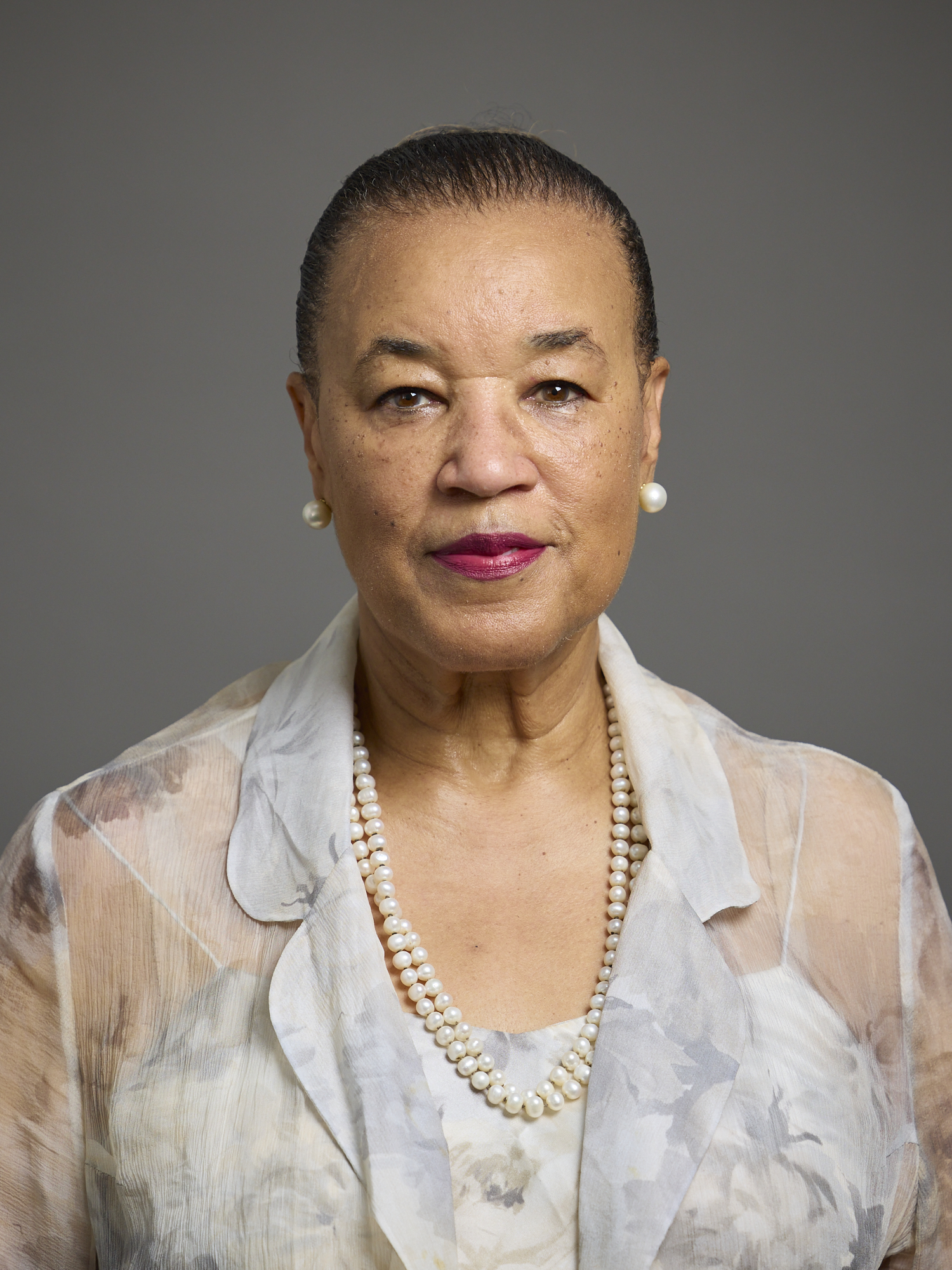
- Official portrait, 2026

6th Secretary-General of the Commonwealth of Nations
- In office 1 April 2016 – 31 March 2025
- Head: Elizabeth II; Charles III
- Chair: Joseph Muscat (Malta); Theresa May (UK); Boris Johnson (UK); Paul Kagame (Rwanda); Fiamē Naomi Mataʻafa (Samoa)
- Preceded by: Kamalesh Sharma
- Succeeded by: Shirley Ayorkor Botchwey

Attorney General for England and Wales
- In office 28 June 2007 – 11 May 2010
- Prime Minister: Gordon Brown
- Preceded by: The Lord Goldsmith
- Succeeded by: Dominic Grieve
Junior ministerial offices
Advocate General for Northern Ireland
In office 12 April 2010 – 11 May 2010
Prime Minister	Gordon Brown
Preceded by	Office created
Succeeded by	Dominic Grieve
Attorney General for Northern Ireland
In office 28 June 2007 – 12 April 2010
Prime Minister	Gordon Brown
Preceded by	The Lord Goldsmith
Succeeded by	John Larkin
Minister of State for Criminal Justice and Offender Management (Note: Crime Reduction from May to June 2007.)
In office 12 June 2003 – 28 June 2007
Prime Minister	Tony Blair
Preceded by	The Lord Falconer of Thoroton
Succeeded by	The Baroness Browning (2011)
Parliamentary Secretary for Lord Chancellor's Department
In office 12 June 2001 – 13 June 2003 Serving with Rosie Winterton, Michael Wills (until May 2002) and Yvette Cooper (from May 2002)
Prime Minister	Tony Blair
Preceded by	The Lord Bach
Succeeded by	The Lord Filkin
Parliamentary Under-Secretary of State for Foreign and Commonwealth Affairs
In office 28 July 1999 – 12 June 2001
Prime Minister	Tony Blair
Preceded by	The Baroness Symons of Vernham Dean
Succeeded by	Ben Bradshaw; The Baroness Amos
Further offices held
Shadow Attorney General for England and Wales
In office 11 May 2010 – 7 October 2011
Leader	Harriet Harman (acting); Ed Miliband
Preceded by	Edward Garnier
Succeeded by	Emily Thornberry
Member of the House of Lords
Lord Temporal
Life peerage 30 October 1997

Personal details
- Born: Patricia Janet Scotland; 19 August 1955 (age 71) Dominica, British Windward Islands
- Party: Labour
- Education: University College London; Middle Temple
- Profession: Barrister

Patricia Janet Scotland, Baroness Scotland of Asthal, PC, KC (born 19 August 1955), is a Dominican-British barrister and politician who served as the sixth secretary-general of the Commonwealth of Nations from 2016 to 2025. She was the first woman to hold that post.

After working as a barrister in London, she was appointed as a life peer in 1997 and, as a British Labour Party politician, served in ministerial positions within the UK Government, most notably as Attorney General for England and Wales and as Advocate General for Northern Ireland. She is a dual citizen of the United Kingdom and Dominica, where she was born.

== Early life and career ==
Scotland was born on 19 August 1955 in Dominica, in the British Windward Islands. She was the tenth child of twelve born to Roman Catholic parents, a Dominican mother and Antiguan father. When she was two years old, her family immigrated to Walthamstow in north-east London, where she attended Chapel End Primary School and Walthamstow School for Girls. She then went on to Mid Essex Technical College in Chelmsford, and she obtained a Bachelor of Laws degree from University College London, which at that time awarded the University of London's qualifications. She was called to the bar at the Middle Temple in 1977, specialising in family law, and was called to the Dominican bar in 1978.

In 1991, Scotland was appointed as a Queen's Counsel. She later founded the (now closed) 1 Gray's Inn Square barristers' chambers in London. Early in 1997, she was elected as a Bencher of the Middle Temple. Scotland was named as a Millennium Commissioner on 17 February 1994, and she was a member of the Commission for Racial Equality. She received a life peerage on a Labour Party list of working peers and was made Baroness Scotland of Asthal, of Asthal in the County of Oxfordshire, on 30 October 1997.

== Politics ==
From 1999 to 2001, Scotland was the Parliamentary Under-Secretary of State at the Foreign and Commonwealth Office, where she was responsible, among others, for the UK Government's diplomatic relations with North America, the Caribbean, Overseas Territories, Consular Division, British Council, administration and all Parliamentary business in the House of Lords. Scotland introduced the International Criminal Court Bill which sought to ratify the jurisdiction of the International Criminal Court into UK law.

In 2001, she became Parliamentary Secretary, Lord Chancellor's Department, and was made a member of the Privy Council of the United Kingdom. She was the minister formally responsible for civil justice and the reform of civil law including the comprehensive reform of land registration leading to the Land Registration Act 2002. She was also formally responsible for international affairs at the Lord Chancellor's Department and was appointed by Prime Minister Tony Blair as the UK Alternate Representative to the European Convention and was given primary responsibility for the negotiations in relation to the Charter of Rights which were successfully concluded in 2003.

Scotland was an unsuccessful contender for a cabinet position in 2003, when Blair reportedly considered appointing her Leader of the House of Lords.

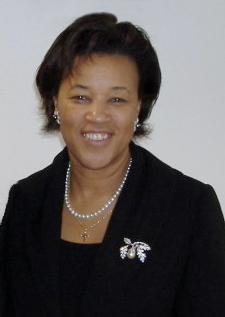
Scotland in 2005

In 2003, Scotland was made Minister of State for the Criminal Justice System and Law Reform at the Home Office and deputy to the Home Secretary. She served in that post until 2007 under three Home Secretaries: David Blunkett, Charles Clarke and John Reid.

=== Attorney General ===
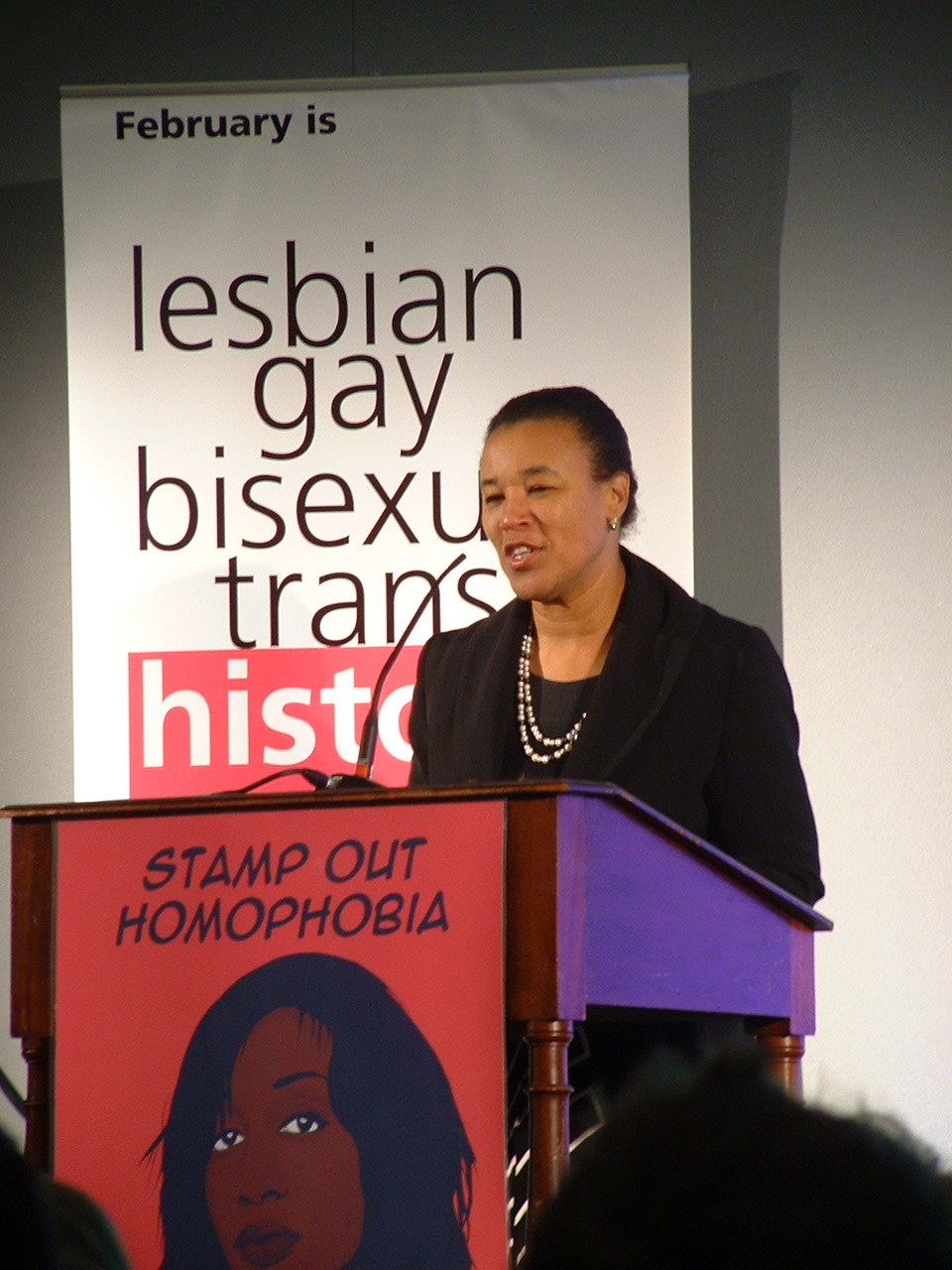
Scotland speaking at the Royal Courts of Justice before LGBT History Month (2007)

On 28 June 2007, Scotland was appointed Attorney General by Prime Minister Gordon Brown. She was the first woman to hold the office since its foundation in 1315.

She was the last Attorney General for England and Wales also to be the Attorney General for Northern Ireland before the devolution of justice powers to the Northern Ireland Assembly, and appointment of a separate Attorney General for Northern Ireland. She became instead Advocate General for Northern Ireland, the UK government's chief advisor on Northern Ireland law, for a brief period until Labour left office.

=== Shadow Attorney General ===
When Labour left government on 11 May 2010, Scotland became the Shadow Attorney General and was reappointed to that role by Ed Miliband when he appointed his first Shadow Cabinet in October 2010.

In November 2012, she was appointed Prime Ministerial Trade Envoy to South Africa.

=== Local government ===
In December 2014, Scotland was elected as the Alderman for the ward of Bishopsgate in the City of London, having stood (in accordance with convention in the City) as an independent candidate.

== Commonwealth Secretary-General ==
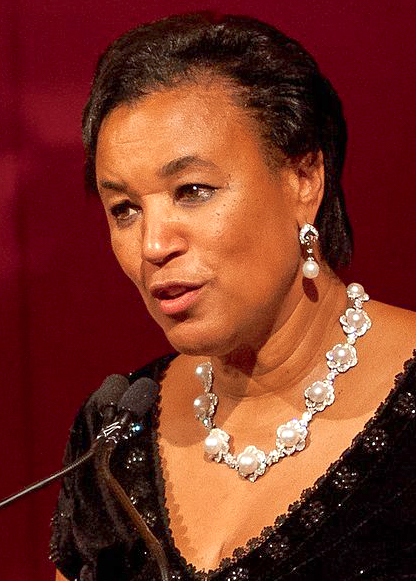
Scotland in 2013

At the 2015 Commonwealth Heads of Government Meeting, Scotland was nominated for the position of Commonwealth Secretary-General by her native country of Dominica and defeated Antiguan diplomat Ronald Sanders, who was thought to have been the frontrunner for the position, and former deputy secretary-general for political affairs Mmasekgoa Masire-Mwamba of Botswana to become the sixth Commonwealth Secretary-General and the first woman to hold the post. She began her first of a maximum of two possible four-year terms on 1 April 2016.

Her candidacy was opposed by retired Canadian senator Hugh Segal, formerly Canada's special envoy to the Commonwealth and a member of the 2009—2011 Commonwealth Eminent Persons Group mandated to recommend reforms to improve Commonwealth governance, who wrote in an editorial that Scotland was not qualified for the position because she "accepted a well-paying brief from a junta in the Maldives to argue against the Commonwealth's legitimacy when it and Canada sought the restoration of democracy in that country."

Her bid to have her four-year term automatically renewed was rejected in June 2020, in contrast to the usual convention where an incumbent seeking a second term in office is elected unopposed for his or her second term. This followed a "significant and diverse number of colleagues from across the Commonwealth" raising objection to the proposal, due to allegations of cronyism following an audit of the Commonwealth Secretariat's procurement practices. Her first term was extended, however, due to the postponement of the 2020 Commonwealth Heads of Government Meeting.

Scotland was re-elected to a second term at the 2022 Commonwealth Heads of Government Meeting, reportedly defeating Jamaican foreign minister Kamina Johnson Smith by 27 votes to 24. As her first term had been extended by two years due to the pandemic and the postponement of the 2020 CHOGM, Scotland promised that she will only serve for two more years instead of a full four-year term.

In her capacity as Secretary General, Baroness Scotland performed a scripture reading at the funeral of Queen Elizabeth II in Westminster Abbey on 19 September 2022.

== Controversies ==
=== Illegal immigrant employment penalty ===
In January 2009, Scotland employed Lolo Tapui, an illegal immigrant, as a cleaner. Tapui had been using a forged passport for the period up to and including December 2008. Tapui was later jailed for eight months for fraud, possessing a false identity stamp, and overstaying her UK visa. At her trial, Tapui admitted to having been paid £95,000 by the Daily Mail. She was later deported to her native Tonga.

Scotland, who was Attorney General at the time, had earlier been subjected to a penalty of £5,000 for employing Tapui. She had not kept copies of relevant documents to check Tapui's immigration status and could therefore not establish a statutory defence. The rules were established when Scotland was a Home Office minister. The investigation by the UK Border Agency found that Scotland did not "knowingly" employ an illegal worker.

=== Expenses controversy ===
In November 2016, political blogger Guido Fawkes published purported extracts from leaked documents exposing Scotland's extravagant spending on redecorating her grace and favour apartment in Mayfair, London. Scotland denied the claims in a statement posted on the Commonwealth's website, insisting there had been "no extravagance at all" and explained that the spending was agreed by Kamalesh Sharma, the Commonwealth's secretary-general from 2008 to 2016.

=== Contract controversy ===
In January 2020, Scotland faced further criticism of her role as secretary-general of the Commonwealth for awarding a consultancy contract to a company run by a friend. The Audit Committee of the international organisation noted that she offered a contract to a fellow Labour peer, Lord Patel of Bradford, despite his firm being "apparently insolvent" and "circumventing" the normal competitive tendering process. Auditors also found that procurement rules had not been observed by the secretariat on over 50 occasions.

=== Praise for Azerbaijan ===
Scotland has praised the authoritarian regime in Azerbaijan for its leadership on climate issues. In 2024, she attended an event in Baku organized by a newly created Azerbaijani NGO run by a businessperson with close ties to the authoritarian regime. At the event, she urged young Azerbaijanis to support their authoritarian government. She also laid flowers at the grave of Azerbaijani dictator Heydar Aliyev. She attended an event in 2015 at Baku’s Four Seasons Hotel launching a book praising Azerbaijan's state-owned oil company SOCAR.

== Awards ==
Scotland was decreed and invested by Prince Carlo, Duke of Castro, as a Dame of Merit with Star of the Sacred Military Constantinian Order of Saint George in 2003. In 2014 she was appointed to the Council of the British and Irish Delegation of the Constantinian Order and promoted in rank to Dame Grand Cross of Merit. Scotland has been voted Peer of the Year by Channel 4, The House magazine, Parliamentarian of the Year by the Spectator and the Political Studies Association, and received a number of other awards for her contribution to law reform in the UK and abroad. Scotland was awarded an honorary degree from the University of East London in 2005. Powerlist ranked her as the most influential Black Briton in 2010, 2007 and 2008. On 1 January 2014, she was appointed chancellor of the University of Greenwich. In 2015, she was listed as one of BBC's 100 Women.

== Personal life ==
Scotland resides in London and in Asthal, Oxfordshire, where she and her husband Richard Mawhinney, also a barrister, live with their two sons.

Scotland's son Matthew Mawhinney has appeared on the reality series Too Hot to Handle. In 2021, he was arrested and fined for abusing cabin crew on a British Airways flight, including shouting "Look up who my mum is – Baroness Scotland [...] go and get me a drink" after being refused alcohol.

Scotland is the Patron of the Corporate Alliance Against Domestic Violence, Chineke! Foundation, Missio, and Children and Families Across Borders (CFAB).

== Arms ==
Coat of arms of Patricia Scotland
Escutcheon Azure on a Saltire Argent between four Fleur-de-lis heads outwards Or a Saltire Azure Supporters On either side a Red-billed Tropic Bird proper Motto Gratia In Te Est Badge Two Red-billed Tropic Birds volant in saltire proper

== Notes ==
Political offices
Preceded by The Lord Goldsmith	Attorney General for England and Wales; 2007–2010	Succeeded by Dominic Grieve
Preceded by The Lord Goldsmith	Attorney General for Northern Ireland; 2007–2010	Succeeded by John Larkin
New office	Advocate General for Northern Ireland; 2010	Succeeded by Dominic Grieve
Preceded by Edward Garnier	Shadow Attorney General; 2010–2011	Succeeded by Emily Thornberry
Academic offices
Preceded by Garry Hart, Baron Hart of Chilton	Chancellor of the University of Greenwich; 2014–present	Incumbent
Diplomatic posts
Preceded by Kamalesh Sharma	Secretary-General of the Commonwealth of Nations; 2016–2025	Succeeded by Shirley Ayorkor Botchwey
