= East–West Council =

British government forum

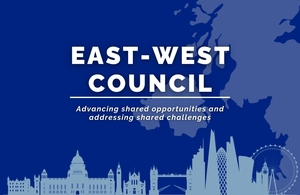
- Formation: 26 March 2024; 2 years ago
- Legal status: Joint committee
- Purpose: Intergovernmental relations
- Region served: United Kingdom
- Members: UK Government; Northern Ireland Executive
- Chair: Minister for Intergovernmental Relations: Hamish Falconer
- Deputy Chair: Northern Ireland Secretary: Chris Bryant

The East–West Council is a joint committee with a purpose to improve links between Northern Ireland and rest of the United Kingdom. It was established in 2024 as part of the 2024 formation of the Northern Ireland Executive.

== Purpose ==
According to the Government of the United Kingdom its missions include:

- Sharing "best practice" between Great Britain and Northern Ireland on economic inactivity and offering advisory support to implement "major projects"
- Recommending interventions on east–west investment and assessing existing funding and investment strategies
- Improving international investment to Northern Ireland
- Bolstering east–west connectivity

== History ==
The idea of forming an East–West Council was first proposed by Democratic Unionist Party Leader Jeffrey Donaldson in October 2023 as a prerequisite to restoring a power-sharing executive in Northern Ireland. Donaldson hoped that the proposed body would "bring together representatives from across the United Kingdom", on a "regular basis" to "discuss and collaborate on opportunities for enhanced co-operation". Plans for the council were outlined in a command paper published by the UK government in February 2024. Devolved government was restored in Northern Ireland on 3 February 2024 when a first minister, deputy first minister and executive were nominated by the Northern Ireland Assembly. The East–West Council met for the first time on 26 March 2024 at Dover House in London.

== Membership ==
The council is made up of representatives from the UK central government, Northern Ireland Executive, business and civil society. It was chaired by the Minister for Intergovernmental Relations.

== Meetings ==
Overview of East–West Council meetings
Date	Chair	Location
26 March 2024	Michael Gove	Dover House, London
12 June 2025	Pat McFadden	Belfast

== See also ==
- Intergovernmental relations in the United Kingdom
- Intertrade UK
- Prime Minister and Heads of Devolved Governments Council
- British-Irish Council
- British-Irish Intergovernmental Conference
- British–Irish Parliamentary Assembly
- Council of the Nations and Regions
- Northern Ireland Assembly
- North/South Inter-Parliamentary Association
- North/South Ministerial Council
