= John Larkin (barrister) =

Former Attorney General for Northern Ireland

John Larkin KC
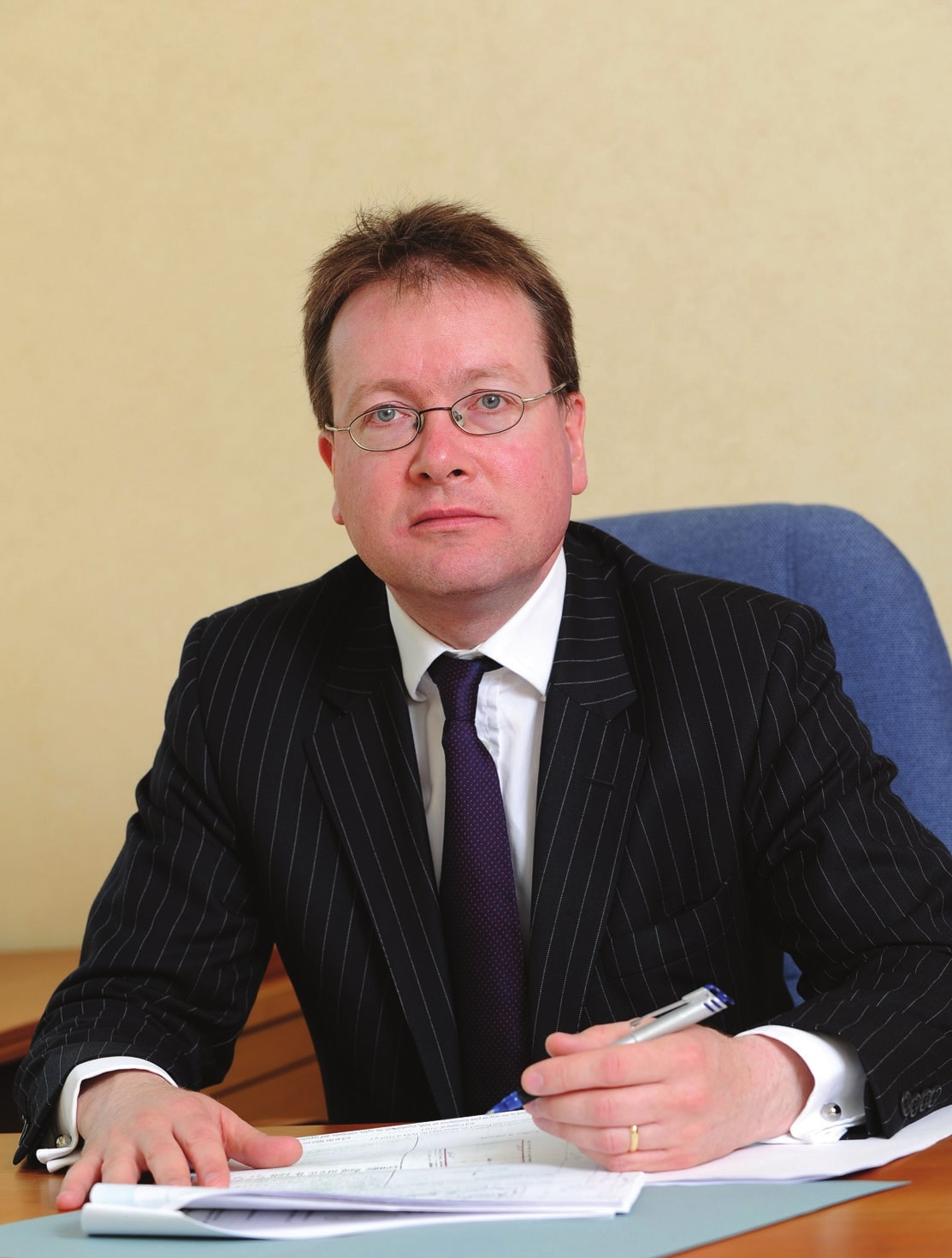

Attorney General for Northern Ireland
- In office 24 May 2010 – 30 Jun 2020
- First Minister: Peter Robinson; Arlene Foster
- Deputy First Minister: Martin McGuinness; Michelle O'Neill
- Preceded by: Patricia Scotland
- Succeeded by: Brenda King

Personal details
- Born: 1964 (age 61–62) Belfast, Northern Ireland
- Party: Alliance (until 1989)
- Education: Queen's University Belfast
- Profession: Barrister

John F. Larkin KC (born 1964), is the former Attorney General for Northern Ireland.

He was the first person to hold the office separately since its functions were assumed by the Attorney General for England and Wales in 1972. He was the first holder of the office not to be a politician sitting in either the Parliament of Northern Ireland, at Stormont, or the UK Parliament.

== Early life ==
Larkin was born in Belfast and educated at St Mary's Christian Brothers' Grammar School and Queen's University Belfast, where he read law. He was subsequently called to the Bar of Northern Ireland and practised as a barrister.

== Career ==
In the early 1980s. he was involved in politics as a member of the Alliance Party of Northern Ireland, but ceased to be active as his legal career took off. In 1989, at the age of 25, Larkin was appointed as Reid Professor of Criminal Law, Criminology and Penology at Trinity College Dublin. He returned to Northern Ireland in the 1990s to work at the Northern Ireland Bar, specialising in administrative law, civil liberties and human rights, competition and constitutional law, defamation and judicial review.

On 20 November 2013, he recommended eliminating prosecutions, inquests or inquiries into events which preceded the Good Friday Agreement of 1998. Certain politicians and policemen accused him of attempting to violate international law.

On 25 November, he received a letter from Jim Allister regarding Traditional Unionist Voice allegations against the BBC to which he replied three days later saying that it would not be appropriate for him to comment on that issue.

On 10 June 2014, he attended hearing on the so-called on-the-run letters.

== Views ==
Larkin is opposed to abortion, commenting in 2008 on BBC Radio Ulster that abortion was the same as shooting a baby in the head. During his later tenure as Attorney-General, Larkin was accused of using his office to further his personal opposition to abortion, with a series of actions including urging the Northern Ireland Assemby's justice committee to examine the legality of Belfast's Marie Stopes Clinic. Committee members said his intervention was inappropriate and amounted to an attempt to 'take control' of an Assembly inquiry. Larkin also opposed a Northern Ireland woman's attempt to legally challenge the province's abortion laws, claiming she did not have the standing to do so. The woman later won her case.

Larkin attempted to intervene in a European Court of Human Rights case taken by two Austrian lesbians. Larkin argued that countries should be able to 'opt out' of laws to support adoption by gay couples. The UK Government distanced itself from Larkin, saying it had not been consulted.

After his tenure as Attorney-General, Larkin acted as senior counsel for the Society for the Protection of the Unborn Child in their challenge to Northern Ireland's 2021 abortion regulations. The challenge failed.

== Resignation ==
John Larkin stood down on 30 June 2020 as Attorney General and was replaced by Brenda King, First Legislative Counsel in the Executive Office.

Political offices
Preceded by Patricia Scotland	Attorney General for Northern Ireland; 2010–2020	Succeeded by Brenda King
