= 2024 Northern Ireland Executive formation =

Cabinet formation in Northern Ireland

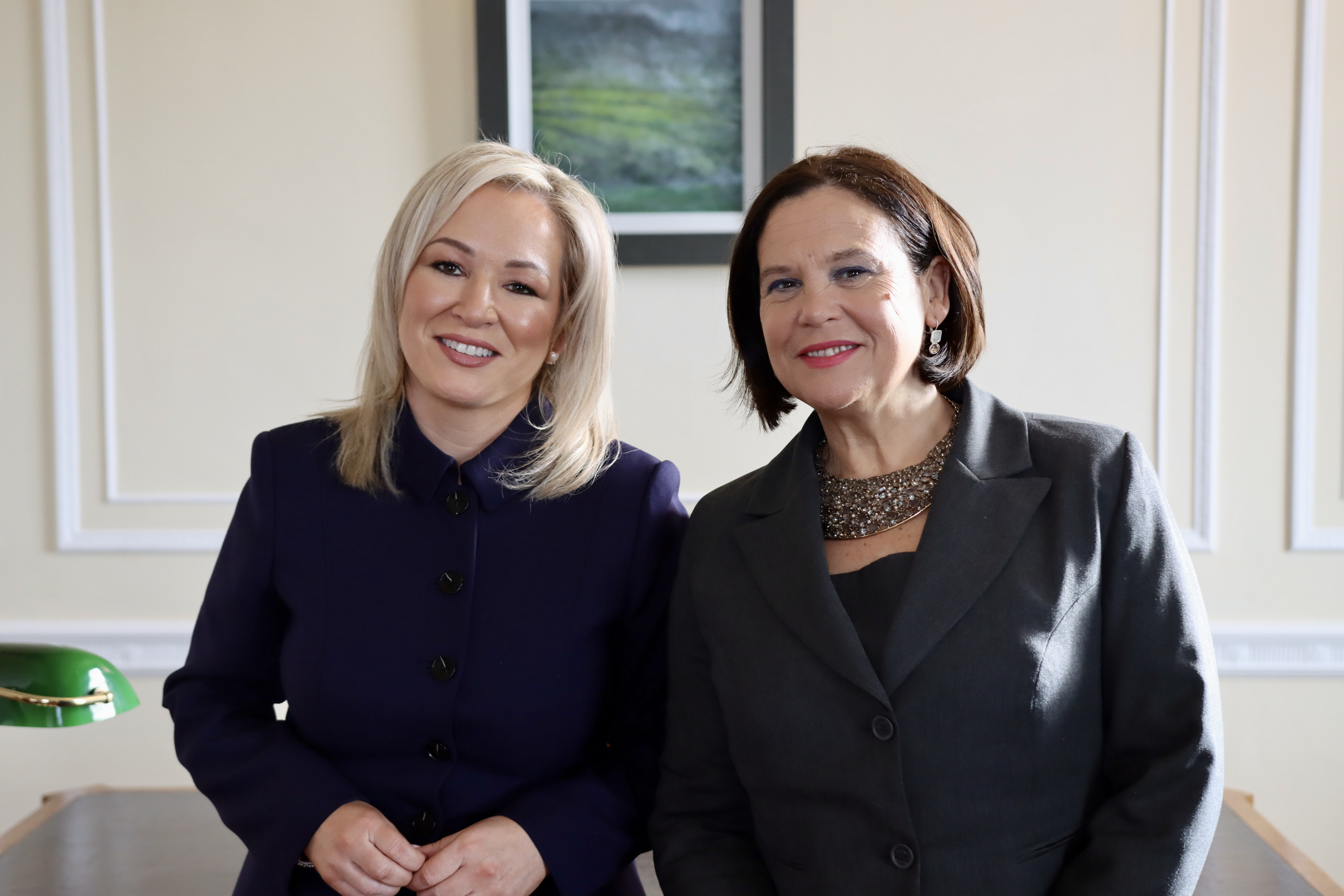
Sinn Féin President Mary Lou McDonald (right) and vice president Michelle O'Neill

The 2024 Northern Ireland Executive formation followed on from the 2022 Northern Ireland Assembly election, but was delayed to February 2024. The 22 months delay in the restoration of the Northern Ireland Executive resulted from a boycott of the process by the Democratic Unionist Party (DUP). Eventually it resulted in the formation of the Executive of the 7th Northern Ireland Assembly, led by Michelle O'Neill of Sinn Féin as First Minister and Emma Little-Pengelly of the DUP as deputy First Minister. This marked the first time an Irish republican became First Minister and a British unionist became deputy First Minister, rather than vice versa.

== Background ==
With Brexit in January 2020, issues with the Irish border arose due to the Brexit withdrawal agreement. In the Brexit negotiations potential issues were considered with the Irish backstop. In December 2021, a judge ruled that DUP ministers boycotting the North/South Ministerial Council to protest the Northern Ireland Protocol were an "abject breach of their solemn pledge".

The 2022 Northern Ireland Assembly election resulted in Sinn Féin becoming the largest party, marking the first time an Irish nationalist/republican party won the most seats. This gave them the right to nominate Northern Ireland's first-ever nationalist first minister of Northern Ireland. The Democratic Unionist Party refused to return to power-sharing over disagreements over the Northern Ireland Protocol and the Windsor Framework. The absence of an executive left senior civil servants controlling the nine government departments.

== Events ==
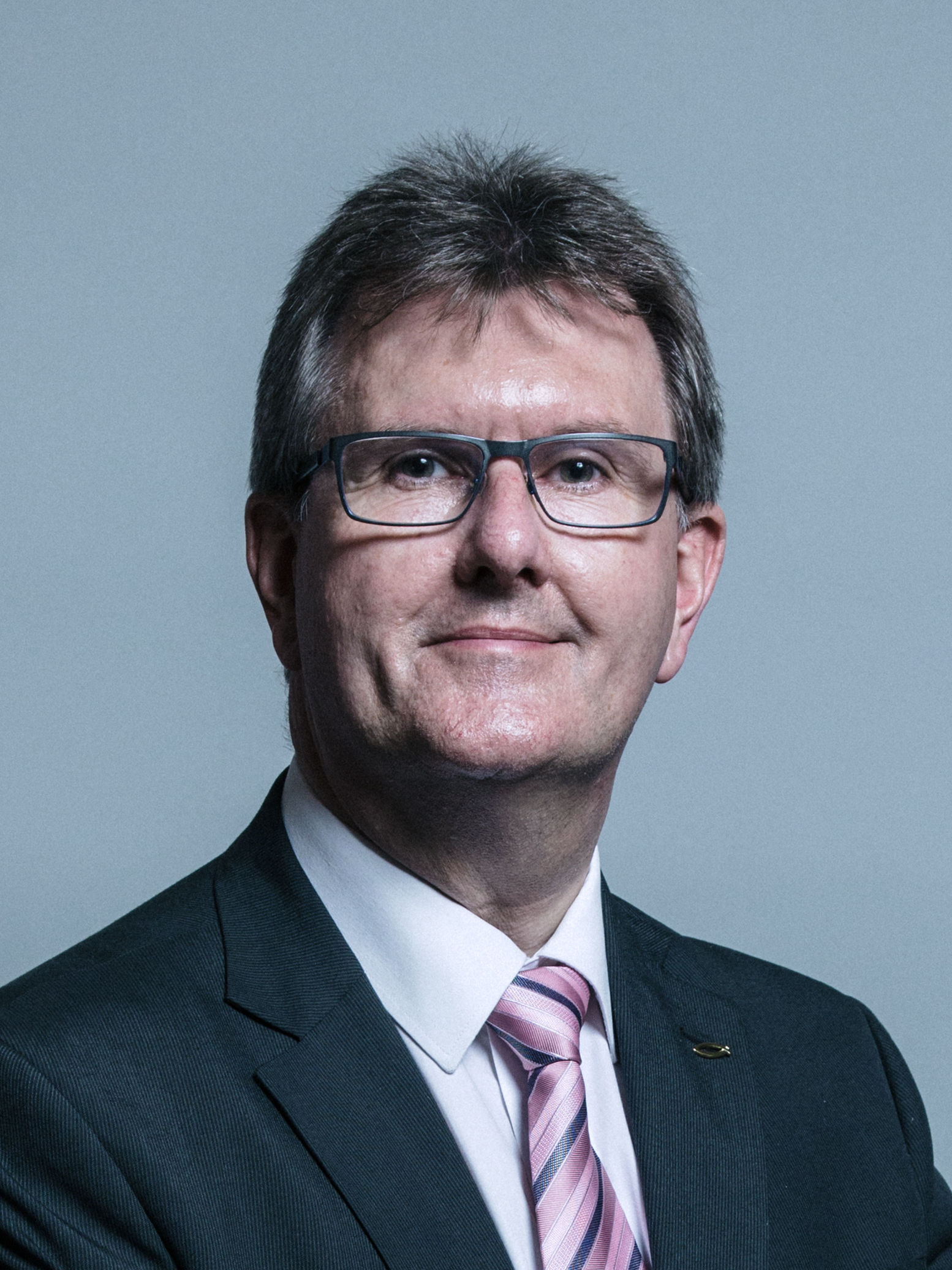
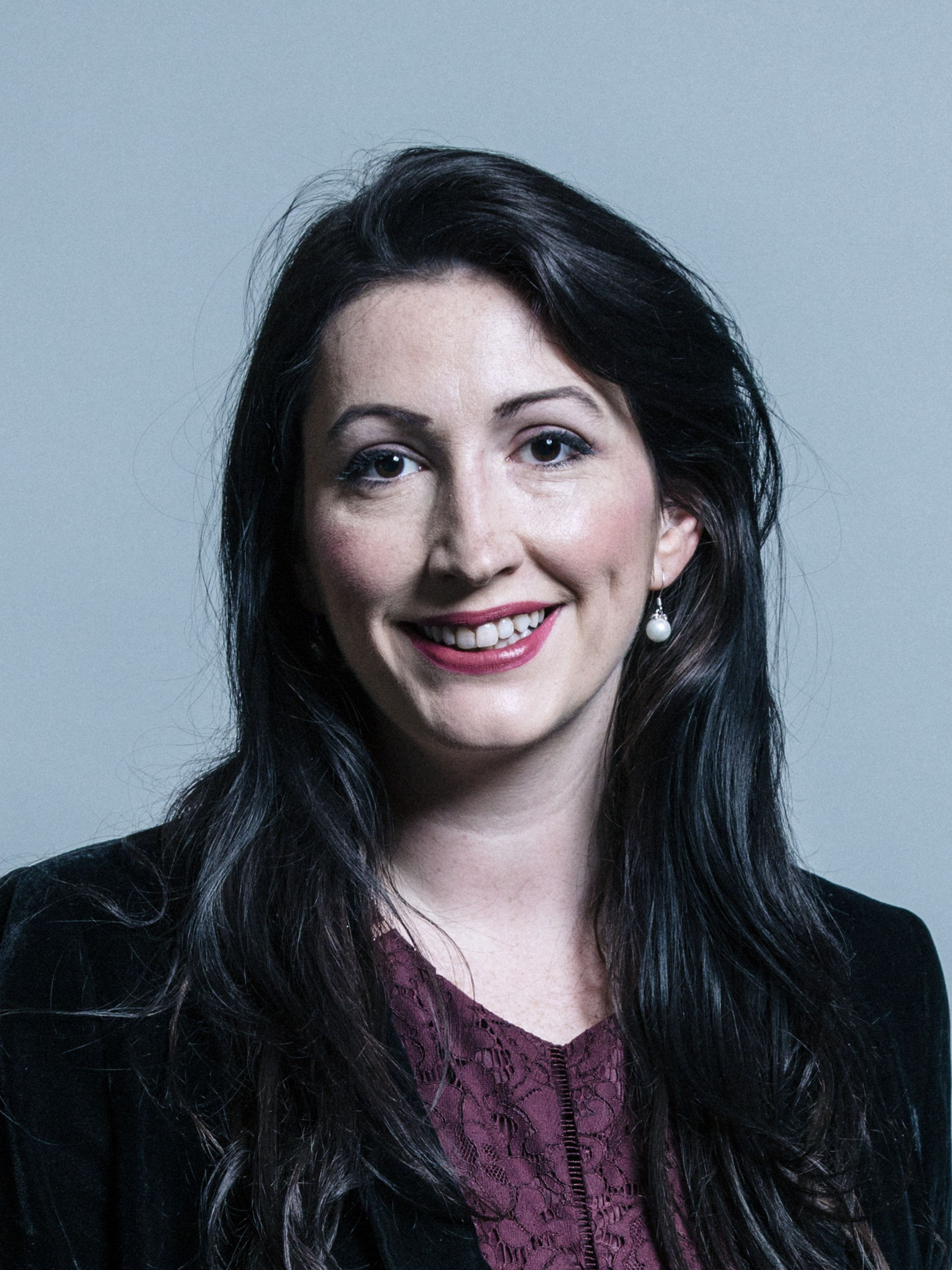
DUP leader Jeffrey Donaldson (left) and the party's choice for deputy First Minister Emma Little-Pengelly (right)

Under protocol according to the Good Friday Agreement if no executive is formed within six months of an Assembly election, the United Kingdom Government's Northern Ireland Secretary can call a new election early. On 28 September 2022, Chris Heaton-Harris, the Secretary of State for Northern Ireland, stated that he had a legal obligation to call an early election on 28 October if no government was formed by that date, probably to be held no later than January 2023. Sinn Féin leader Michelle O'Neill voiced her opposition to such an election: "The people spoke, and the people asked for a functioning executive, they asked for us to make politics work." Both the UK Prime Minister Rishi Sunak and the Irish Tánaiste Leo Varadkar had urged the DUP to agree to the formation of a Government.

The parties met on 27 October and failed to elect a Speaker, the fourth time they had met and failed to do so, and no government was formed by the deadline. On 28 October, Heaton-Harris expressed disappointment that no Executive had been formed and acknowledged his legal duty to call an election, but delayed immediately calling one. The chief electoral officer said the election date would likely be 15 December. The last date that an election could be held under the legislation existing then was 19 January 2023.

On 29 October, Heaton-Harris continued to delay calling an election. Claire Hanna, a Member of Parliament for the SDLP, reacted to the news, saying an election was now "less likely". Heaton-Harris held another round of talks with the political parties on 1 November, amid speculation that the UK government could introduce legislation to delay the need for a new election. However, Northern Ireland Office Minister Steve Baker said on 2 November that Heaton-Harris "will soon confirm the date of the next Northern Ireland Assembly election as required by law."

Northern Ireland (Executive Formation etc) Act 2022 (Note: Section 15.)
- Act of Parliament
- Parliament of the United Kingdom
- Long title: An Act to make provision to extend the period following the Northern Ireland Assembly election of 5 May 2022 during which Ministers may be appointed and after which the Secretary of State must propose a date for another election; about the exercise of functions in the absence of Northern Ireland Ministers; to confer powers on the Secretary of State to determine salaries and other benefits for Members of the Assembly in respect of periods in which the Assembly is not functioning; and to confer powers on the Secretary of State to set the regional rate in Northern Ireland.
- Citation: 2022 c. 48
- Introduced by: Chris Heaton-Harris MP, Secretary of State for Northern Ireland (Commons); Lord Caine (Lords)
- Territorial extent: England and Wales; Scotland; Northern Ireland; (Note: Section 13.)

Dates
- Royal assent: 6 December 2022
- Commencement: 6 December 2022 (except sections 6–9); 7 February 2023 (rest of act); (Note: Section 14. The Northern Ireland (Executive Formation etc) Act 2022 (Commencement) Regulations 2023 (SI 2023/89).)
Other legislation
Amended by	Northern Ireland (Executive Formation and Organ and Tissue Donation) Act 2023; Northern Ireland (Interim Arrangements) Act 2023; Northern Ireland (Ministerial Appointment Functions) (No. 2) Regulations 2023; Northern Ireland (Executive Formation) Act 2024
Relates to	Northern Ireland Act 1998

Status: Amended

Text of statute as originally enacted

Revised text of statute as amended

On 4 November, Heaton-Harris said an election would not be held in December. On 9 November, he said that he would be introducing legislation to (retrospectively) extend the deadline to form a new Assembly Executive to 8 December 2022, with the option for an additional 6-week extension. The requisite legislation, the Northern Ireland (Executive Formation etc) Act 2022 (c. 48), was passed by the Westminster Parliament on 6 December 2022.

In November 2022, British prime minister Rishi Sunak and Tánaiste Micheál Martin met in Blackpool at the British-Irish Council summit. Sunak said he was confident a breakthrough in negotiations over the Northern Ireland Protocol were possible.

The December 2022 deadline passed without any resolution. The deadline was extended to 19 January 2023. Heaton-Harris invited the parties to new talks on 11 January 2023 to discuss the situation, but Sinn Féin pulled out in protest at the exclusion of its president, Mary Lou McDonald, after which the SDLP refused to take part as well.

Under the then legislation, the latest possible date for the next election, if an Executive is not formed, was 13 April 2023. The deadline to form an Executive passed on 19 January 2023, but Heaton-Harris played down the prospect of him calling a snap election.

Under then existing legislation, Heaton-Harris had to call an election by the end of the first week of March 2023. However, he proposed a further extension, with a new deadline to form an Executive of 18 January 2024 proposed. This was achieved through the Northern Ireland (Executive Formation and Organ and Tissue Donation) Act 2023, which completed its passage through the Westminster Parliament in late February 2023.

On 27 February 2023, the UK and EU announced the Windsor Framework to make changes to the Northern Ireland Protocol. It was hoped that this would lead to formation of an Assembly executive. However, the DUP boycott continued. Talks with the DUP continued without success through to December.

The Assembly was recalled on 17 January 2024. The DUP position was unchanged. Heaton-Harris said that he would, again, bring primary legislation to further extend the deadline to 8 February 2024, via the Northern Ireland (Executive Formation) Bill 2024.

Northern Ireland (Executive Formation) Act 2024 (Note: Section 2(3).)
- Act of Parliament
- Parliament of the United Kingdom
- Long title: An Act to make provision to extend the period following the Northern Ireland Assembly election of 5 May 2022 during which Ministers may be appointed.
- Citation: 2024 c. 2
- Introduced by: Chris Heaton-Harris MP, Secretary of State for Northern Ireland (Commons); Lord Caine (Lords)
- Territorial extent: England and Wales; Scotland; Northern Ireland; (Note: Section 2(1).)

Dates
- Royal assent: 25 January 2024
- Commencement: 25 January 2024 (Note: Section 2(2).)
Other legislation
Amends	Northern Ireland (Executive Formation etc) Act 2022

Status: Current legislation

History of passage through Parliament

Text of statute as originally enacted

Revised text of statute as amended

On 18 January 2024, the legal deadline to restore power-sharing was passed. The same day the largest general strike in more than 50 years was held across Northern Ireland, in protest over pay. Secretary of State for Northern Ireland Chris Heaton-Harris released a statement on the situation. In 25 January, the Northern Ireland (Executive Formation) Act 2024 (c. 2) was introduced to extend the period necessary for restoration of government without calling a snap election. It came into law the same day.

On 29 January 2024, an urgent meeting of the Democratic Unionist Party executive was called following the passing over the deadline to restore power sharing at Stormont. Details of the meeting were leaked to loyalist activist Jamie Bryson. Jeffrey Donaldson revealed in the morning that his party would return to Stormont. This end of the boycott was welcomed by Sinn Féin.

The UK Government published a command paper laying out the deal. The deal will end the alignment of EU law in Northern Ireland. Due to the Brexit withdrawal agreement, internal trade was disrupted between the British Isles. A DUP agreement with the Sunak ministry will reportedly reduce checks and paperwork on goods moving from Great Britain to Northern Ireland. This involves the creation of a "UK internal market" in order to ease unionist fears over de facto border in the Irish Sea. Some hard-line loyalists criticised the DUP for "selling out".

== Formation of the 7th Assembly ==
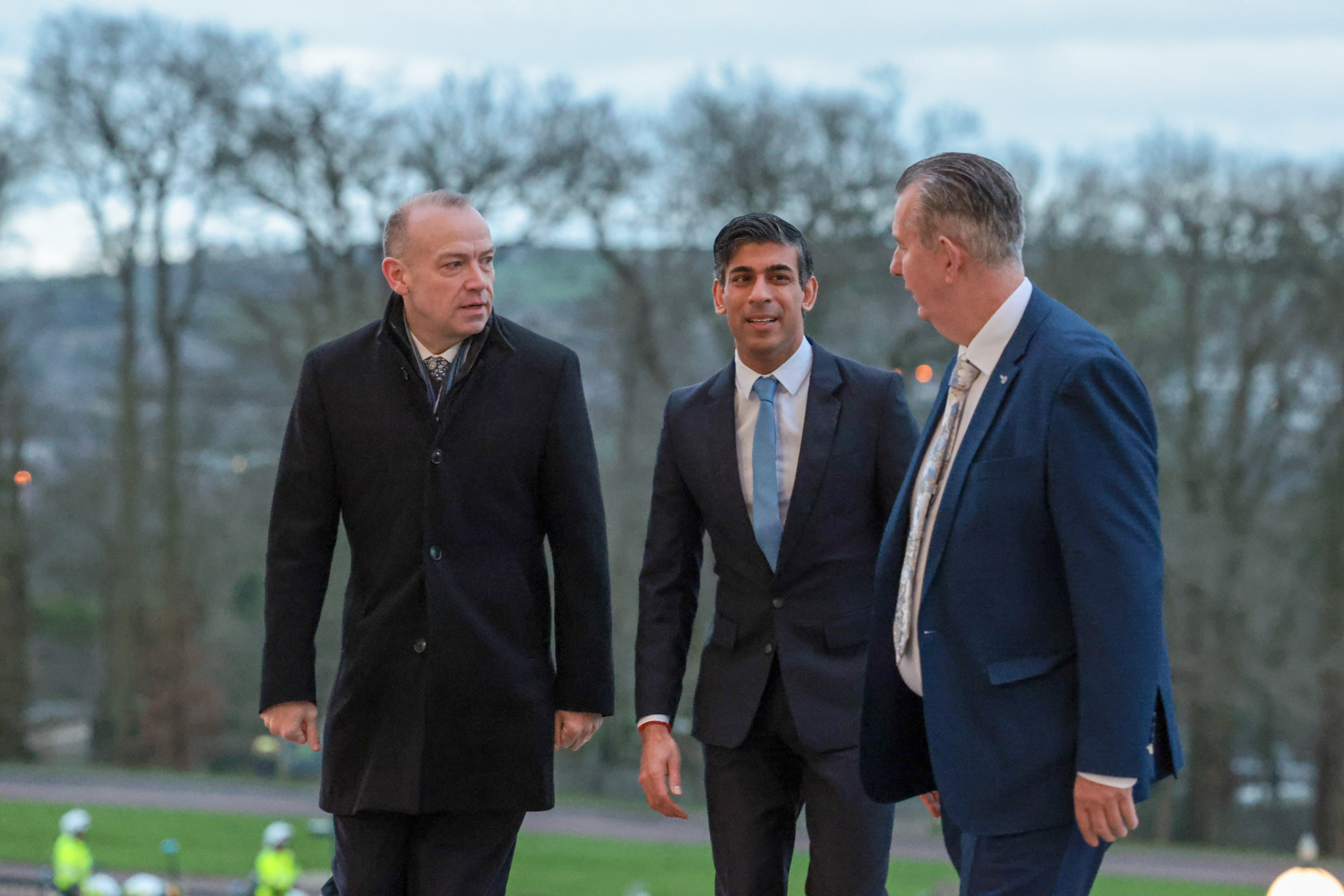
Speaker Edwin Poots MLA (right), Prime Minister Rishi Sunak MP (center), Secretary of State Chris Heaton-Harris (left) In Belfast on 6 February 2024

On 30 January, the parties returned to Stormont for talks. The same day further public sector strikes were held. The Assembly sat on Saturday 3 February. Fresh elections were to be called had the executive not been formed by 8 February.

On 3 February 2024, the Northern Ireland Assembly met to elect a new Speaker, with Edwin Poots, a former leader of the DUP, chosen to be the Assembly's 7th Speaker. Sinn Féin's Michelle O'Neill was nominated as First Minister, becoming the first nationalist politician to hold the post, while the DUP's Emma Little-Pengelly was appointed deputy. Alliance and the UUP also took ministerial positions and they were entitled to one each. The Justice portfolio was assigned separately and was also filled by Alliance. The SDLP missed out on any ministerial positions due to winning insufficient seats in the Assembly so they went into opposition instead. The SDLP were joined in opposition by three other members; Jim Allister from Traditional Unionist Voice, Gerry Carroll from People Before Profit and Independent Unionist Claire Sugden.

== Consequences ==
The formation had been considered to boost Sinn Féin's chances in the Irish general election later that year. However this failed to happen with Fianna Fáil going on become the biggest party, while Sinn Féin only achieved small gains in elections for the Dáil as well as EU elections and local elections.

In March 2024, the East–West Council held their first meeting. The non-departmental public body Intertrade UK was established as part of a concession to the DUP.
