= Sheree Jemmotte-Rodney =

Sheree Jemmotte–Rodney is a Montserrat lawyer, and the Attorney General of Montserrat since 2016. She recognized Hon. Albert Redhead, who retired in 2016 from the High Court in Brades.
