= Intertrade UK =

British government body

- Formation: 14 May 2024; 2 years ago
- Legal status: Non-departmental public body
- Region served: United Kingdom
- Chair: The Baroness Foster of Aghadrumsee
- Website: https://www.gov.uk/government/groups/intertrade-uk

Intertrade UK is a public body to promote trade within the UK which was announced as part of the UK government package to restore devolution to Northern Ireland.

It was created alongside the East–West Council as part of a DUP deal behind the 2024 Northern Ireland Executive formation.

It has been chaired by The Baroness Foster of Aghadrumsee since September 2024.

The body will oversee the new Northern Ireland trade deal. This includes goods and services across the Irish Sea.

== Panel members ==
Intertrade UK full panel members appointed on 28 February 2025 by Secretary of State for Northern Ireland Hilary Benn:

- The Baroness Foster of Aghadrumsee - Chair of Intertrade UK
- Dr Esmond Birnie - Senior Economist, Ulster University
- Kirsty McManus - Northern Ireland Director, Institute of Directors
- Suzanne Wylie - Chief Executive Officer, Northern Ireland Chamber of Commerce
- Roger Pollen - Head of Federation of Small Businesses Northern Ireland
- Angela McGowan - Director for Northern Ireland, Confederation of British Industry

== See also ==
- East–West Council
