= Advocate General for Northern Ireland =

Northern Irish law officer of the Crown

United Kingdom Advocate General for Northern Ireland
- Royal Arms of His Majesty's Government

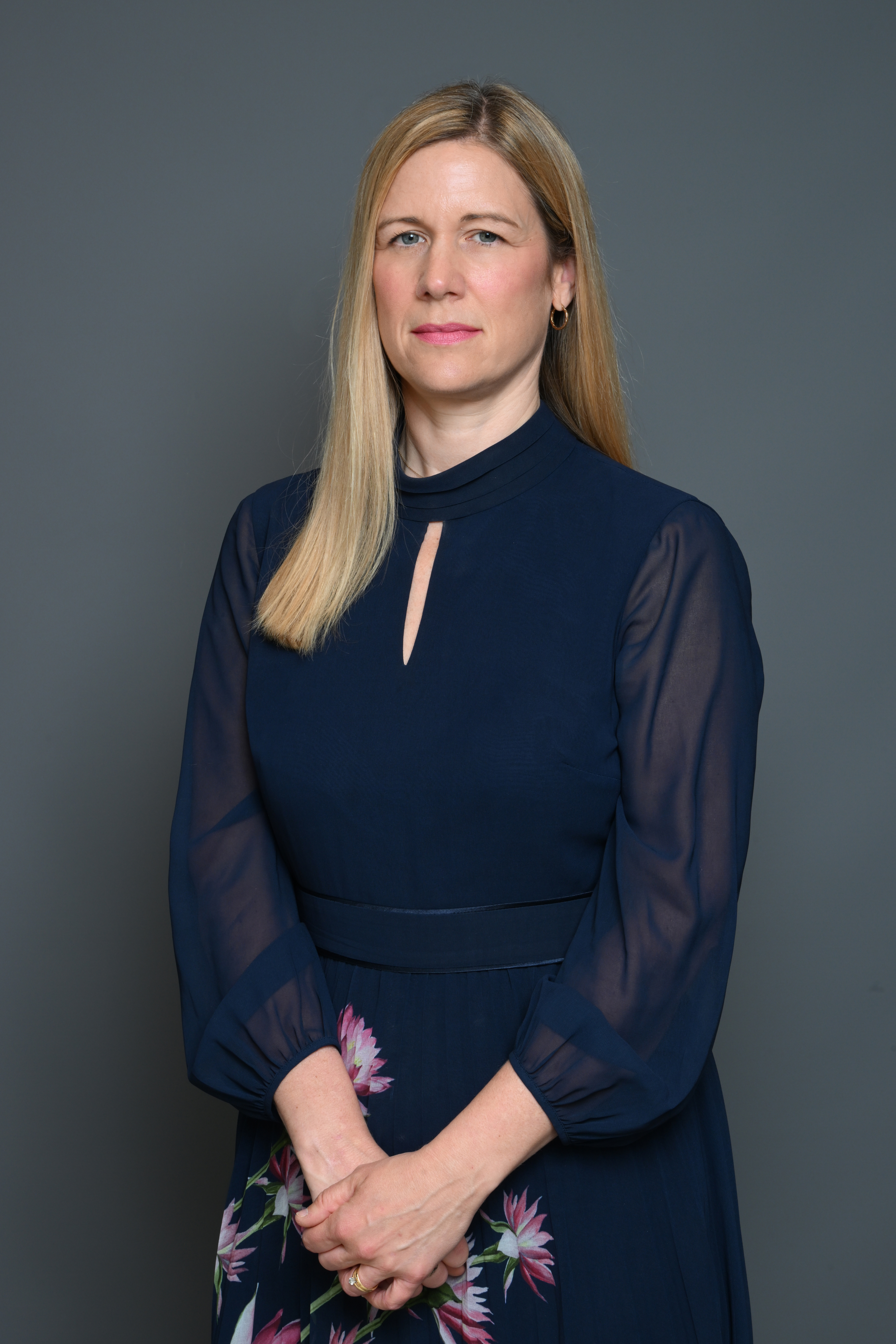
- Incumbent; Ellie Reeves since 20 July 2026
- Attorney General's Office
- Style: The Right Honourable
- Reports to: The Prime Minister and the Secretary of State for Justice
- Appointer: The King (on the advice of the Prime Minister)
- Term length: At His Majesty's pleasure
- Formation: April 2010
- First holder: Patricia Scotland
- Deputy: Attorney General
- Website: www.gov.uk

The advocate general for Northern Ireland is the chief legal adviser to the Government of the United Kingdom on Northern Ireland law and the post is held by the attorney general for England and Wales by virtue of that office. The advocate general and the solicitor general for England and Wales have, in Northern Ireland, the same rights of audience as members of the Bar of Northern Ireland. They are called to the Northern Ireland Bar in order to fulfill these duties.

The advocate general was created as a separate office by the Justice (Northern Ireland) Act 2002 upon the devolution of policing and justice powers to the Northern Ireland Assembly on 12 April 2010.

Unlike the advocate general for Scotland, the position is not supported by a distinct government department. Instead, that support is provided by the civil law and Northern Ireland section within the Attorney General's Office at Westminster.

The chief legal adviser to the Northern Ireland Executive is the attorney general for Northern Ireland.

The advocate general retains the power to refer the question of whether a bill passed by the Northern Ireland Assembly to the Supreme Court of the United Kingdom is within the competence of the Assembly.

== List of advocates general ==
Colour key (for political parties):
Conservative Labour

Advocate General	Term of office		Political party	Prime Minister
Patricia Scotland; Baroness Scotland of Asthal	12 April 2010	11 May 2010	Labour	Brown
Dominic Grieve; MP for Beaconsfield	12 May 2010	15 July 2014	Conservative	Cameron (coalition)
Jeremy Wright; MP for Kenilworth and Southam	15 July 2014	9 July 2018	Conservative	Cameron
Jeremy Wright; MP for Kenilworth and Southam	15 July 2014	9 July 2018	Conservative	May
Geoffrey Cox; MP for Torridge and West Devon	9 July 2018	13 February 2020	Conservative	May
Geoffrey Cox; MP for Torridge and West Devon	9 July 2018	13 February 2020	Conservative	Johnson
Suella Braverman; MP for Fareham	13 February 2020	2 March 2021	Conservative	Johnson
Michael Ellis; MP for Northampton North (acting)	2 March 2021	10 September 2021	Conservative	Johnson
Suella Braverman; MP for Fareham	10 September 2021	6 September 2022	Conservative	Johnson
Michael Ellis; MP for Northampton North	6 September 2022	25 October 2022	Conservative	Truss
Victoria Prentis; MP for Banbury	25 October 2022	5 July 2024	Conservative	Sunak
Richard Hermer, Baron Hermer	5 July 2024	20 July 2026	Labour	Starmer
Ellie Reeves; MP for Lewisham West and East Dulwich	20 July 2026	Incumbent	Labour	Burnham

== See also ==
- Law Officers of the Crown
- Attorney General for England and Wales
- Attorney General for Northern Ireland
- Advocate General for Scotland
- Department of Justice (Northern Ireland)
