= Brian Cottle =

Brian Cottle is a lawyer and judge from Saint Vincent and the Grenadines who has worked in a number of Commonwealth countries in the Caribbean.

Cottle earned his bachelor of laws degree from the University of the West Indies. From 1987 to 1990, he worked as a lawyer in Trinidad and Tobago. Between 1990 and 2002, he worked in the Attorney-General's office in three successive countries: Saint Vincent and the Grenadines (1990–1999), Montserrat (2000–2002), and Antigua and Barbuda (2002).

In 2002, he was appointed by the Judicial and Legal Services Commission of the Caribbean Community to be a master in the Eastern Caribbean Supreme Court; he was elevated to High Court Judge in 2007. As a member of the Court, since 2002 he has been assigned to reside in and hear cases from Grenada, Saint Lucia, and Dominica. His most recent transfer—to the Dominica High Court—was in 2009.
