= Arlene Foster =

First Minister of Northern Ireland (2016–2017, 2020–2021)

The Right Honourable The Baroness Foster of Aghadrumsee DBE PC
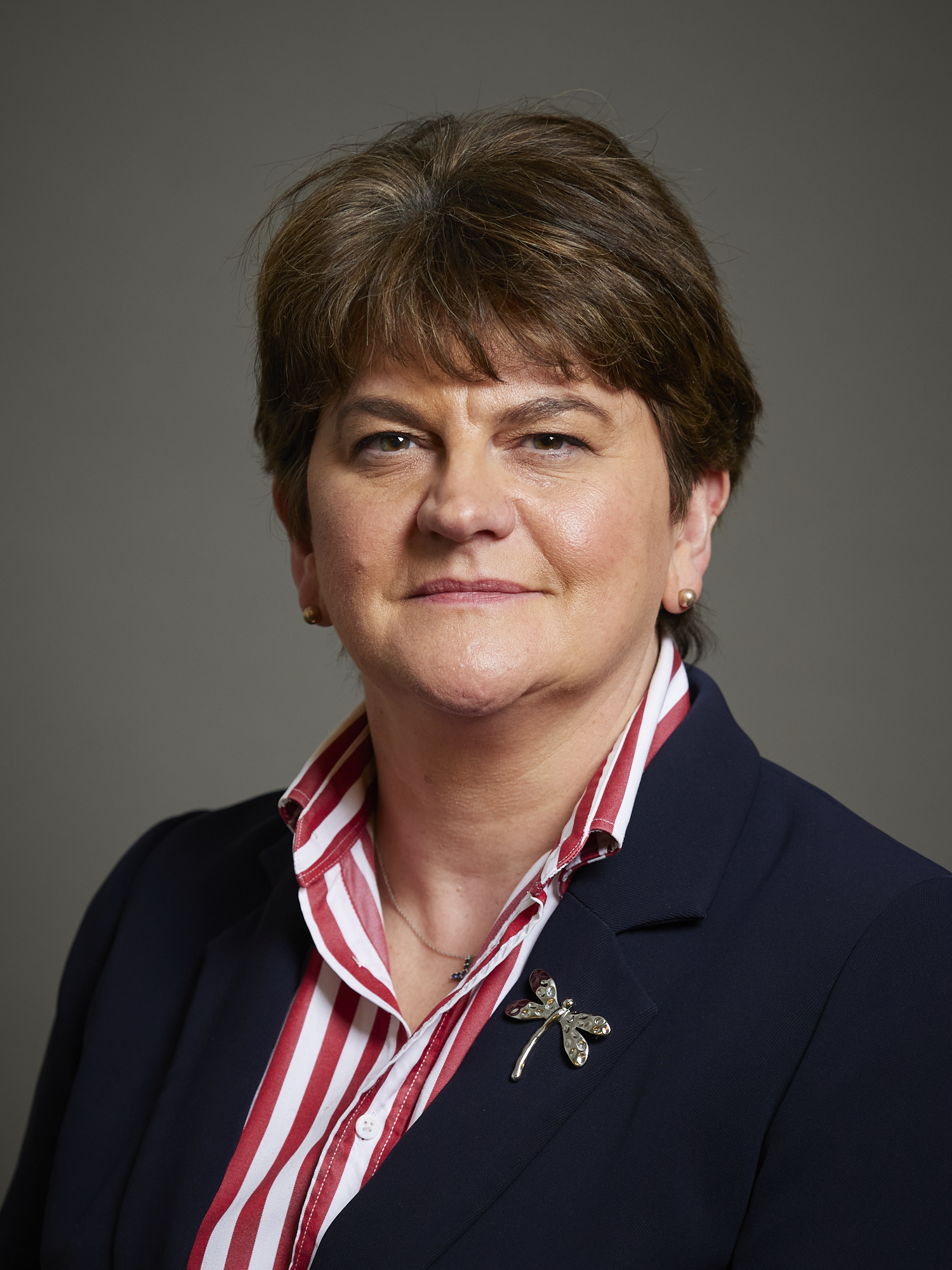
- Official portrait, 2024

Chair of Intertrade UK
- Incumbent
- Assumed office 19 September 2024
- Appointed by: Steve Baker
- Secretary of State: Hilary Benn; Chris Bryant
- Preceded by: Position established

First Minister of Northern Ireland
- In office 11 January 2020 – 14 June 2021 Serving with Michelle O'Neill
- Preceded by: Herself (2017)
- Succeeded by: Paul Givan
- In office 11 January 2016 – 9 January 2017^{[a]} Serving with Martin McGuinness
- Preceded by: Peter Robinson
- Succeeded by: Herself (2020)

Leader of the Democratic Unionist Party
- In office 17 December 2015 – 28 May 2021
- Deputy: The Lord Dodds of Duncairn
- Preceded by: Peter Robinson
- Succeeded by: Edwin Poots

Minister for Finance and Personnel
- In office 11 May 2015 – 12 January 2016
- Preceded by: Simon Hamilton
- Succeeded by: Mervyn Storey

Minister for Enterprise, Trade and Investment
- In office 9 June 2008 – 11 May 2015
- Preceded by: Nigel Dodds
- Succeeded by: Jonathan Bell

Minister for the Environment
- In office 8 May 2007 – 9 June 2008
- Preceded by: Dermot Nesbitt
- Succeeded by: Sammy Wilson

Member of the House of Lords
- Lord Temporal
- Life peerage 9 November 2022

Member of the Legislative Assembly for Fermanagh and South Tyrone
- In office 26 November 2003 – 6 October 2021
- Preceded by: Joan Carson
- Succeeded by: Deborah Erskine

Member of Fermanagh District Council
- In office 5 May 2005 – 5 May 2011
- Preceded by: Raymond Ferguson
- Succeeded by: Alison Brimstone
- Constituency: Enniskillen

Personal details
- Born: Arlene Isobel Kelly; 17 July 1970 (age 56) Enniskillen, Northern Ireland
- Party: None (non affiliated)
- Other political affiliations: Democratic Unionist Party (2004–2021); Ulster Unionist Party (Before 2004)
- Spouse: Brian Foster (m. 1995)
- Children: 3
- Education: Queen's University Belfast
- Website: Official website
- ^aFoster served as acting first minister from 11 January 2010 to 3 February 2010 and from 10 September 2015 to 20 October 2015 while Robinson was on leave.

Arlene Isobel Foster, Baroness Foster of Aghadrumsee (née Kelly; born 17 July 1970), is a British broadcaster and politician from Northern Ireland who has been the chair of Intertrade UK since September 2024. She previously served as First Minister of Northern Ireland from 2016 to 2017 and 2020 to 2021 and leader of the Democratic Unionist Party (DUP) from 2015 to 2021. She was the first woman to hold either position. She is a Member of the House of Lords, having previously been a Member of the Legislative Assembly (MLA) for Fermanagh and South Tyrone from 2003 to 2021.

Foster served in the Northern Ireland Executive as Minister of the Environment from 2007 to 2008, Minister for Enterprise and Investment from 2008 to 2015 and Minister for Finance and Personnel from 2015 to 2016. In December 2015, she was elected unopposed to succeed Peter Robinson as leader of the DUP. In January 2016, she became First Minister of Northern Ireland and shared power with Martin McGuinness.

McGuinness resigned as deputy First Minister in January 2017 amid the Renewable Heat Incentive scandal, which involved a green energy scheme that Foster had set up during her time as Minister for Enterprise and Investment. The scheme was set to cost the taxpayer £490 million and there were allegations of corruption surrounding Foster's role in its implementation. McGuinness asked Foster to step aside as First Minister while her involvement in the scheme was investigated, but she refused to step aside or resign and said that those calling for her resignation were "misogynists and male chauvinists". Under the terms of the Northern Ireland power-sharing agreement, the First and deputy First Ministers are equal and, therefore, Foster could not remain in her post as First Minister and was subsequently removed from office. McGuinness's resignation caused a 2017 snap assembly election to be held, in which the DUP lost 10 seats. After no party received an outright majority in the 2017 general election, the DUP entered into an agreement with the Conservative Party to support Prime Minister Theresa May's government. In January 2020, she became First Minister of Northern Ireland again after the executive was reinstated under the terms of the New Decade, New Approach agreement.

On 28 April 2021, after more than 20 DUP MLAs and four DUP MPs signed a letter of no confidence in her leadership, Foster announced that she would resign as party leader and as First Minister. She was succeeded by Edwin Poots as DUP leader on 28 May 2021. Foster left office as First Minister on 14 June 2021 and was succeeded by Paul Givan as First Minister on 17 June 2021. She resigned from the Northern Ireland Assembly in October 2021 and became a presenter on GB News.

In May 2024, Foster was appointed chair of Intertrade UK, a new body to promote trade within the UK which was announced as part of the UK government package to restore devolution. She assumed the role on 19 September 2024.

== Background ==
Arlene Foster (née Kelly) was born in Enniskillen in 1970 and was raised in the townland of Dernawilt, on the outskirts of Aghadrumsee. She is a member of the Church of Ireland. Her father John Kelly was a Royal Ulster Constabulary officer and part time farmer, while her mother was originally from Sandy Row in inner city Belfast. Foster has described her rural County Fermanagh childhood as being happy and idyllic, remarking that although they lived in a nationalist area they never had any difficulties with their neighbours.

Foster's experience with the Troubles began early in her life when a night-time attempt was made in 1979 to kill her father, who was severely injured by the Provisional Irish Republican Army (IRA) at their family farm when a number of gunmen opened fire on him while he was locking up his yard for the night. As a result, her family was forced to leave the Roslea area and move to the Castlebalfour Estate, a housing estate in nearby Lisnaskea. Foster would later accuse Séamus McElwain of being the person responsible for the attack on her father. In 1988, a teenaged Foster was on a school bus that was attacked by the IRA. The bus was targeted with an under vehicle booby trap device because its driver, Ernie Wilson, was a part-time soldier in the Ulster Defence Regiment. Although Foster was not harmed in the explosion, a girl sitting near her was seriously injured. The IRA later released a communiqué claiming the device malfunctioned and should have detonated as soon as the driver left the depot before any children boarded.

Foster was a pupil at Enniskillen Collegiate Grammar School in Enniskillen, County Fermanagh, from 1982 to 1989, and attended Queen's University Belfast (QUB), where she graduated with an LLB degree. Her political career began at Queen's University Belfast when she joined the Queen's Unionist Association, part of the Ulster Unionist Party (UUP). She served as the association's chair from 1992 to 1993. At the 1991 annual conference of the UUP's youth wing, the Ulster Young Unionist Council (UYUC), during abortive talks between the constitutional political parties in Northern Ireland initiated by Secretary of State Peter Brooke, she seconded a motion opposing devolved government in Northern Ireland, instead calling for the province to be more closely integrated with the rest of the United Kingdom. The motion carried. Following the 1993 local elections in Northern Ireland, she wrote a letter to Ulster Review, the current affairs magazine of the UYUC, expressing opposition to power-sharing arrangements with the Social Democratic and Labour Party (SDLP) on local councils where unionists had a majority, arguing that because the SDLP were a nationalist party who wanted to the see the "demise" of Northern Ireland who had "no desire to be full citizens of the United Kingdom" they "should therefore be denied the perks of this citizenship". Having been born on the island of Ireland, Foster herself automatically qualifies for Irish citizenship.

After leaving Queen's University she remained active in the UUP, chairing its youth wing, the UYUC, in 1995. In 1996, she became an Honorary Secretary of the UUP's ruling body, the Ulster Unionist Council, a position which she held until her resignation from the UUP on 18 December 2003. She was a councillor on Fermanagh District Council representing Enniskillen from 2005 to 2010.

== Early Assembly and Executive career (2003–2016) ==
She was elected as an Ulster Unionist in the 2003 Assembly elections. While a member of the UUP, she was part of a "rightwing cabal within the UUP known as the 'baby barristers'." They actively opposed party leader David Trimble, and were a "thorn in [his] side" after he supported the Belfast Agreement.

In 2004, Foster resigned from the UUP and joined the Democratic Unionist Party (DUP), together with fellow Assembly members Jeffrey Donaldson and Norah Beare. She was selected as the DUP's candidate for Fermanagh and South Tyrone in the 2005 UK general election, where she gained 28.8% of the vote.

Negotiations took place between the local branches of the DUP and UUP with the aim of finding an agreed unionist candidate. The negotiations broke down with neither party willing to accept the electoral dominance of the other; the UUP claiming Foster's defection to the DUP disguised the reality of the UUP's electoral strength, while the DUP pointed to the change in the unionist political landscape following the 2003 Assembly election and the 2004 European Parliament election. The UUP candidate was Tom Elliott. Foster finished second in the 2005 general election with 14,056 votes.

On 11 January 2010, she assumed the duties of the First Minister of Northern Ireland, as Peter Robinson stepped aside for a planned period of up to six weeks. Foster worked alongside the deputy First Minister Martin McGuinness. Robinson returned earlier than planned, on 3 February 2010. She again became acting First Minister on 10 September 2015, following the resignation of Robinson and a majority of DUP ministers in the wake of the killing of Kevin McGuigan. Robinson resumed his position as First Minister on 20 October 2015, following a government review into paramilitary activities in Northern Ireland.

=== Minister for the Environment ===
In September 2007, a privately financed proposal for a new Giant's Causeway centre was given preliminary approval by Foster in her role as Northern Ireland Environment Minister. Immediately afterwards, the public money that had been allocated to the causeway development was frozen. The proposal resulted in a public row about the relationship between the private developer Seymour Sweeney and the DUP; Sweeney was a member of the DUP, although both he and the DUP denied that he had ever donated financially to the party.

On 29 January 2008, Foster announced that she had decided against Sweeney's proposal for a £21 million visitors' centre on a protected greenfield site, reversing her earlier position of "being minded" to approve it. Although the public funds for a causeway scheme remained frozen, it seemed highly likely that the publicly funded plan for the causeway would go ahead with the support of deputy DUP leader Nigel Dodds.

=== Minister for Enterprise, Trade and Investment ===
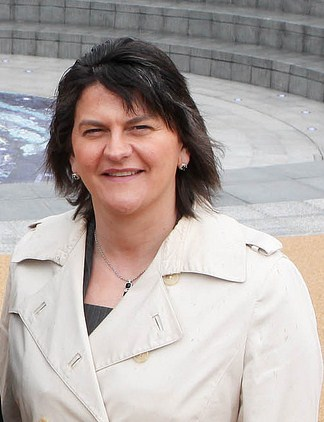
Foster as Minister for Enterprise, Trade and Investment in 2012.

A major concession for Northern Ireland was the reduction to zero of Air Passenger Duty on long-haul flights from the province. In the devolution settlement such burdens were to be born by the Assembly government. But negotiations proved how DUP could sell their support to Whitehall. In 2011, she had written to the Organised Crime Task Force about the need to bring fuel licensing within the remit of the Petrol licensing Consolidation (NI) Act 1929, demonstrating the relevance of cross-border law enforcement jurisdiction in helping to reduce frauds.

As the minister responsible for energy policy in June 2012, Foster criticised the Co-operative Group over the showing of a documentary opposing fracking, saying: "I find your claim that you take 'ethics to the next level' hard to reconcile with your demonstrable support for a film which presents a wholly one-sided and partial approach to the debate about hydraulic fracturing."

She successfully liaised with UK ministers, such as Secretary of State for Northern Ireland Theresa Villiers MP, to restore HMS Caroline in Belfast.

In March 2014, Foster called for an apology for what she described as "deeply insulting" language" in a comment made by fellow MLA Anna Lo of the Alliance Party of Northern Ireland. Lo had described herself as "anti-colonial" and said the partition of Ireland was "artificial". Foster herself was challenged in a blog by Irish writer Jude Collins over the fact that she had chosen to speak out so robustly on the matter after not commenting about remarks made the previous day by another Unionist politician, Progressive Unionist Party leader Billy Hutchinson. The former UVF member who was responsible for two sectarian murders during The Troubles stated that he had "no regrets in terms of my past because I believe that I contributed to preventing a united Ireland." Hutchinson also stated: "There is no room for violence in this society."

== First Minister of Northern Ireland (2016–17; 2020–21) ==
After the resignation of Peter Robinson as DUP leader and Northern Ireland first minister, Foster emerged as the only candidate for the leadership positions. In January 2016, as she was poised to become First Minister, Foster stated that she would not be travelling to Dublin for the official centenary celebrations of the 1916 uprising against British rule, describing the rising as "an attack on democracy".

Arlene Foster was First Minister of Northern Ireland from January 2016 to January 2017. She set the agenda during her maiden speech as First Minister as one of "hope for all the community". In May 2018, she announced she would be leading an Orange Order march in Fife, Scotland. As a committed member of the Order, this was a reason behind the original defection from the UUP ten years ago. As First Minister, Foster was emphatic in support for Brexit with a soft border along the republic; yet leaving the EU on the same terms as the rest of the UK.

The assembly was suspended following disagreements between the parties, particularly over the Renewable Heat Incentive scandal. While the Government talked about restoring the Executive as a "top priority" the constitutional impasse has made it impossible. In May 2018, the High Court ruled that the civil service could not grant planning permission for an incinerator in Mallusk.

In 2018, Foster addressed a PinkNews reception in Belfast, becoming the first DUP leader to attend an LGBT event. Foster stated that, despite her opposition to same-sex marriage, she valued the contribution of the LGBT community in Northern Ireland and requested that differing views be respected.

Committed to a business case, Foster was responsible for a super-fast broadband connection designed to enhance communications with international offerings. Regional Aid proved a vital part of the budget within the devolved framework. The reduction of sales and purchase taxes, such as Air Passenger Duty was typically part of her wider experience of stimulating business at DETI. Fighting the cause of private enterprise has been an important issue for Foster: mobile phone companies and saving Bombardier jobs brought investment of £500 million, while public sector employment has declined.

=== Renewable Heat Incentive scandal ===
In December 2016, Foster faced criticism and controversy after a whistleblower revealed that the Renewable Heat Incentive (RHI) scheme overspent by £400m, a failure which has been nicknamed the Cash for Ash scandal. The scheme was originally set up by the Department of Enterprise, Trade and Investment (DETI, now Department for the Economy) when she was Minister of the department and the scheme offered incentives to businesses if they installed renewable heating systems, such as burning wooden pellets.

She faced strong criticism after it was claimed that she personally campaigned to keep the scheme open, even when senior civil servants warned of the overspend and the Minister responsible, Jonathan Bell, planned on closing it. It remained open for an extra two weeks before it was finally closed. It was also revealed that the Northern Ireland budget would lose £400m over the next 20 years as a result of the failure of the scheme. An independent audit investigated 300 sites and found there were issues at half of them, including 14 cases where there were suspicions of 'serious fraud'.

When senior civil servants suggested the closure of the scheme in September 2015, the Office of the First Minister and deputy First Minister (now the Executive Office) pressured the department to keep the scheme open, which is when there was a spike in applications. There were calls for Foster to resign as First Minister after the scandal broke.

=== Northern Ireland political deadlock, 2017–2020 ===
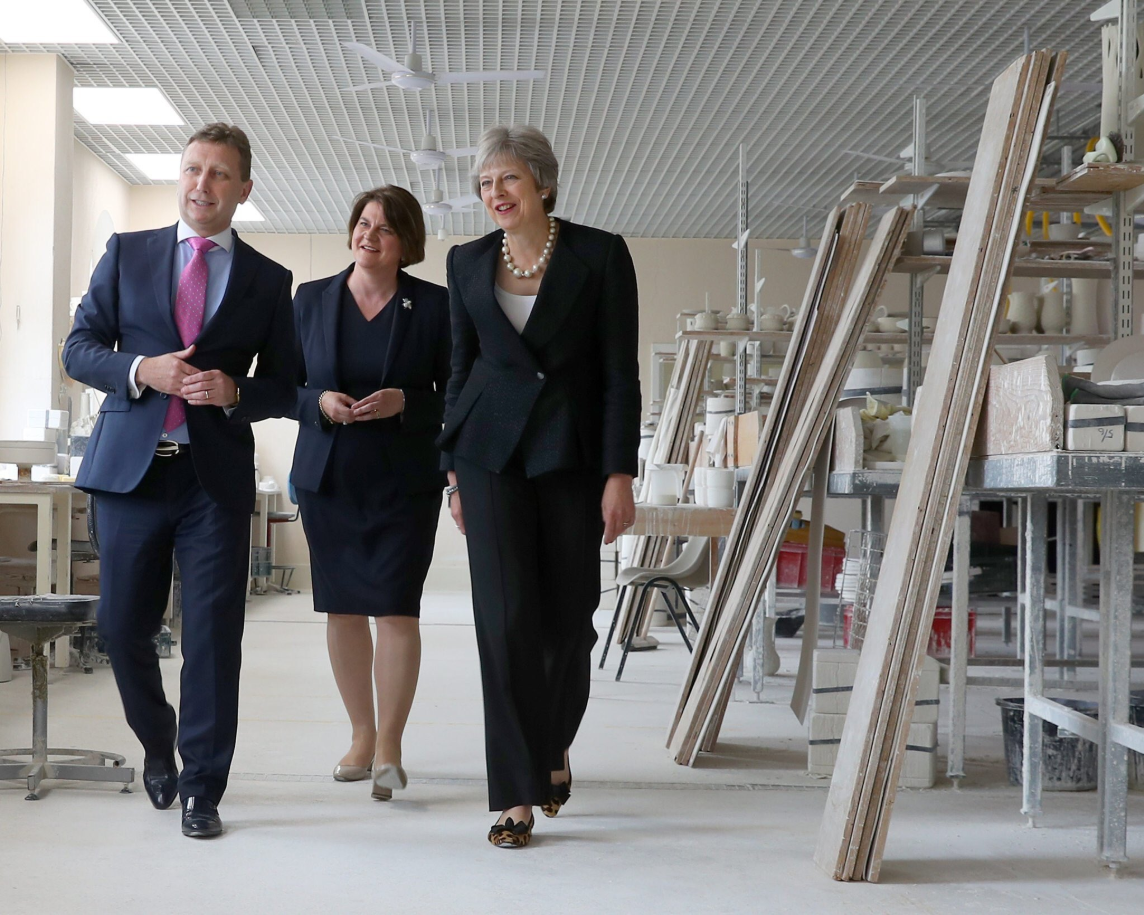
Foster and British Prime Minister Theresa May visit the headquarters of Belleek Pottery in 2018.

On 9 January 2017, McGuinness resigned as deputy First Minister due to the Renewable Heat Incentive scandal. Under the terms of the power-sharing agreement that created what is now the Executive Office, his resignation also resulted in Foster being removed from office, until Sinn Féin nominates a new deputy First Minister; the party stated that it would not replace McGuinness. No nomination was made before 16 January, resulting in the collapse of the Executive. James Brokenshire, the Secretary of State for Northern Ireland, assumed the powers of the Executive and called for a snap election scheduled for 2 March.

In a statement posted to Facebook, Foster said that she was "disappointed" with McGuinness' decision and condemned it as "not principled": "At a time when we are dealing with Brexit, needing to create more jobs and investing in our health and education system, Northern Ireland needs stability. But because of Sinn Féin's selfish reactions, we now have instability, and I very much regret that." She expressed concern over the possibility of another election less than a year after the previous one, and said "this is not an election of our making", but that "the DUP will always defend unionism and stand up for what is best for Northern Ireland."

In this Northern Ireland Assembly election, held in March 2017, the DUP lost 10 seats, leaving them only one seat and 1,200 votes ahead of Sinn Féin, a result described by the Belfast Telegraph as "catastrophic". The withdrawal of the party whip from Jim Wells in May 2018 left the DUP on 27 seats, the same number as Sinn Féin.

Since McGuinness' resignation, Northern Ireland was in a continuous state of political deadlock until January 2020. One of the key issues was the Irish Language Act, which Sinn Féin insist on and Foster has said that her party will never agree to. With regard to the proposed act, she said "If you feed a crocodile, it will keep coming back for more." This remark was widely cited during the 2017 Northern Ireland Assembly election even though Foster later apologised for it.

On 11 January 2020, after the New Decade, New Approach agreement received bipartisan support, the Executive was re-formed with Arlene Foster as First Minister and Sinn Féin's Michelle O'Neill as deputy First Minister.

=== 2017 general election and Conservative-DUP agreement ===
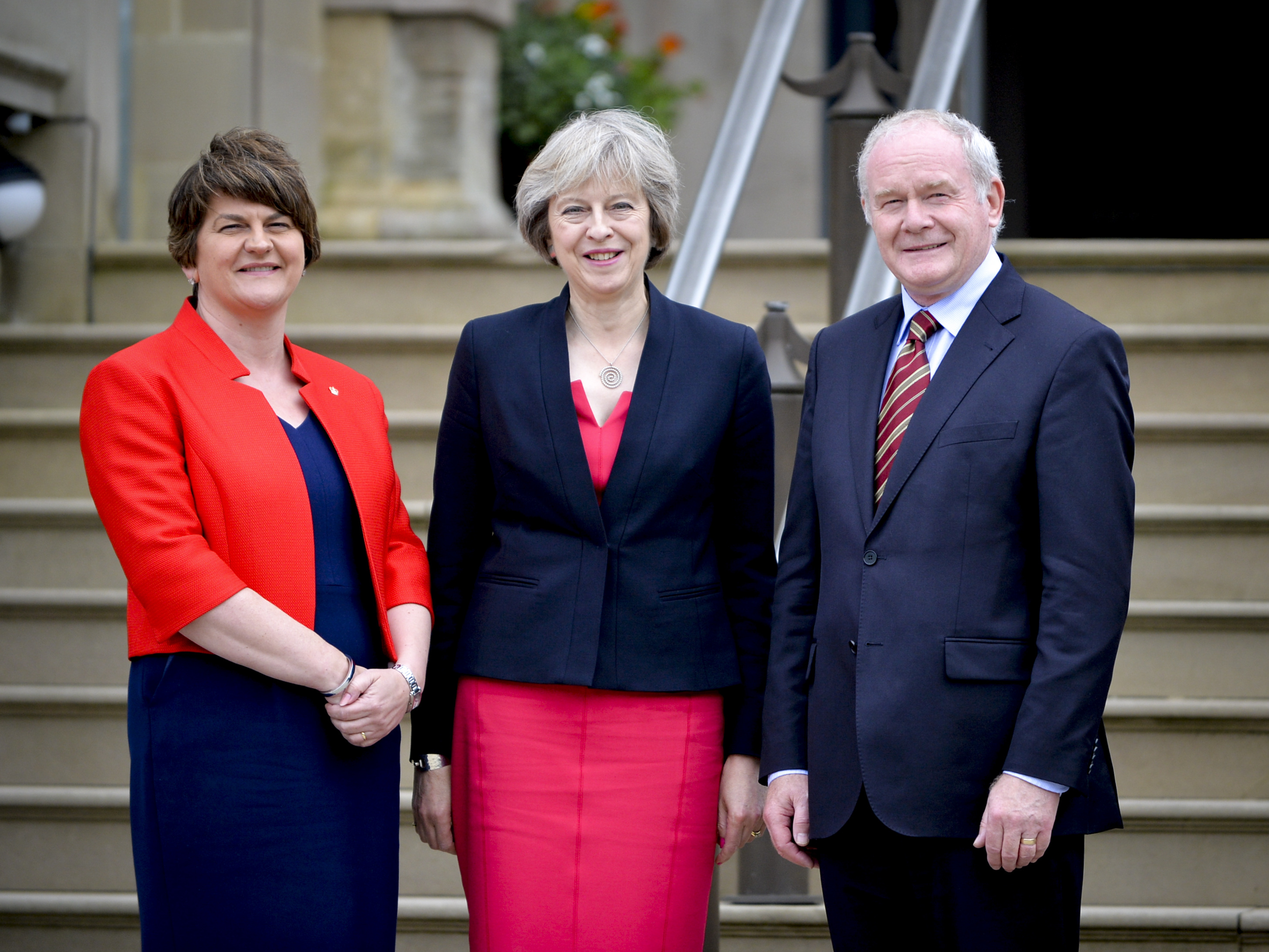
British Prime Minister Theresa May meets with Foster and deputy First Minister Martin McGuinness in 2016.

In the 2017 UK general election, the DUP had 10 seats overall, 3 seats ahead of Sinn Féin. With no party having received an outright majority in the UK Parliament, the DUP entered into a confidence and supply agreement to support the government led by the Conservative Prime Minister Theresa May. A DUP source said: "The alternative is intolerable. For as long as Corbyn leads Labour, we will ensure there’s a Tory PM." The DUP would later withdraw their support over new Prime Minister Boris Johnson's revised proposal for a deal with the EU.

=== Brexit and its aftermath ===
Following a Brexit breakthrough on 8 December 2017, Foster broadly welcomed the deal to progress talks, stating that she was "pleased" to see changes which meant there is "no red line down the Irish Sea".

Both the border issue and opposition to same-sex marriage and abortion are 'red lines' for the eight Unionist MPs. In May 2018, Theresa May stated that abortion is a matter for the devolved Northern Ireland government. However, in 2019, Westminster MPs passed the Northern Ireland (Executive Formation etc) Act 2019. This legislation would legalise same-sex marriage and opposite-sex civil partnership in Northern Ireland (in line with the rest of the UK) and the liberalisation of abortion laws (in line with abortion rights in England and Wales) if no executive was formed by midnight on 21 October 2019. After the Executive was not restored by the deadline, abortion was decriminalised automatically; in December 2019 the British Government passed regulations legalising same-sex marriage and opposite-sex civil partnerships on 13 January 2020. On 25 March 2020, Northern Ireland published the changes to the abortion law. This law permits elective abortions for the first 12 weeks of pregnancy, since 31 March 2020.

In February 2021, after Brexit had been formally consummated on 31 December 2020, Foster objected to its implicit Irish Sea border. In a Daily Telegraph op-ed she maintained that the Northern Ireland Protocol (NIP) had "fundamental flaws" and suggested, in light of the COVID vaccine dispute, that in order to "protect the UK internal market by all legislative means necessary including triggering Article 16, Boris Johnson must now back up those words with tangible actions that protect the integrity of the whole of the United Kingdom."

On 21 February 2021, Foster announced the launch of a judicial review of the NIP as she said it had driven "a coach and horses" through the Act of Union and the Northern Ireland Act 1998, which gives legislative effect to the Belfast Agreement. She takes the position that "Fundamental to the Act of Union is unfettered trade throughout the UK," and that the "new regulatory and customs processes required to bring goods into Northern Ireland from the rest of the UK" are inimical to the Act of Union. She is joined by various members of the DUP along with Kate Hoey, Jim Allister and Ben Habib. The threat of the EU to reinstitute a hard border if not for the customs barrier in the Irish Sea is a problem. The group was joined by Nobel Peace Prize winner David Trimble on 24 February, as he wrote a scathing open letter to Boris Johnson prior to the commencement of proceedings. The group have instructed John Larkin QC, the former attorney general of Northern Ireland. Foster was part of discussions involving deputy First Minister Michelle O'Neill, Chancellor of the Duchy of Lancaster Michael Gove and Vice-President of the European Commission Maroš Šefčovič.

On 29 March 2021, the Johnson government decided not to force a preliminary hearing. A full court case for the Judicial Review was scheduled to be heard the week of 13 May 2021 in the High Court in Belfast. The High Court ruled the Northern Ireland Protocol to be lawful.

=== Resignation as First Minister and DUP leader ===
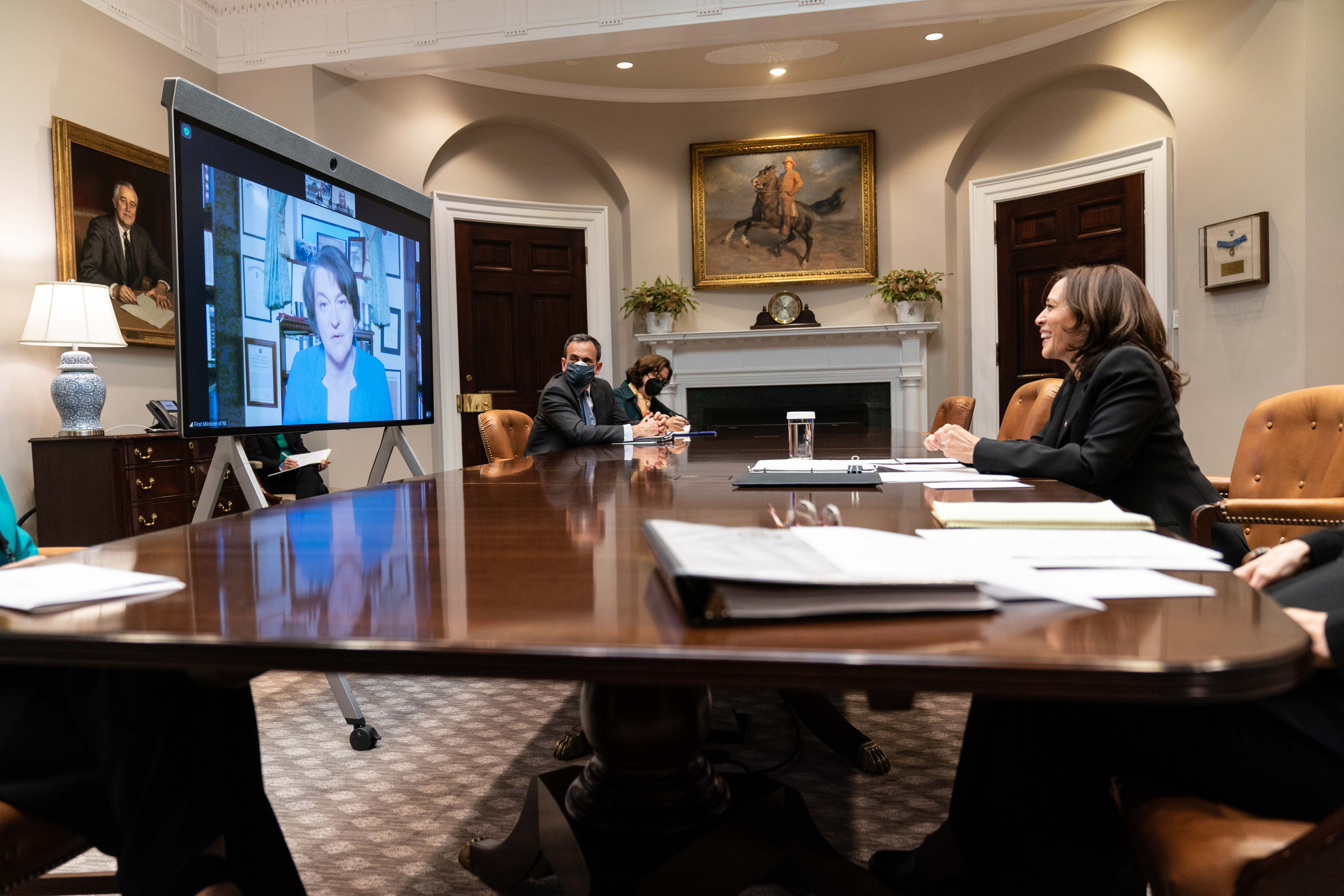
Vice President of the United States Kamala Harris meets with First Minister Arlene Foster in March 2021.

On 27 April 2021, there was an internal revolt when 80% of DUP MPs and MLAs signed a vote of no confidence against Foster. Sources close to the party have said that the move was due to Foster becoming "too moderate", party supporters having "grown tired of leadership which is out of step", the most prominent point of discontent for unionist voters being "the emergence of an Irish Sea border" with the rest of the United Kingdom due to the Northern Ireland Protocol. The next day, she announced her resignation as leader of the party, as well as planning to stand down as First Minister of Northern Ireland at the end of June. The following day, Foster announced her resignation in a statement on social media. In the statement she said that she had informed Maurice Morrow, the party Chairman, and Michelle O'Neill of her decision.

Jeffrey Donaldson MP and Edwin Poots MLA stood in an election to replace Foster as Leader of the DUP. On 14 May 2021, Poots was elected as her successor as DUP leader. Poots succeeded Foster as DUP leader on 28 May 2021. Foster resigned as First Minister at 1pm on 14 June 2021 and Paul Givan succeeded Foster as First Minister on 17 June 2021. In addition to quitting as First Minister, it was initially rumoured that Foster would quit the DUP as a result of her ousting; however, she remained a party member.

On 7 September 2021, it was announced that Foster was to stand down as an MLA, which she did the following month. According to Sam McBride of the Belfast Telegraph, her term as First Minister was "diastrous" to unionism, which she left "in a sorry state when finally driven out" of office.

== Post-premiership (2021–present) ==
Since leaving political office she has embarked on a media career in both broadcast and print media.

On 25 July 2021, Foster was announced as a contributor to the British news channel, GB News. On 15 October 2021, she began to anchor her own show called The Briefing with Arlene Foster on Fridays. She also regularly appears on GB News' Sunday political magazine show The Political Correction.

On 7 October 2021, it was announced that Foster has joined the monthly Local Women magazine as a columnist.

In August 2022, Foster endorsed Liz Truss in the Conservative Party leadership election as the best potential Prime Minister to counter “threats to the Union”.

She was appointed Dame Commander of the Order of the British Empire (DBE) in the 2022 Birthday Honours for political and public service.

On 14 October 2022, it was announced that Foster would be appointed to the House of Lords, sitting as a non-affiliated peer. On 9 November 2022, she was created Baroness Foster of Aghadrumsee, of Aghadrumsee in the County of Fermanagh.

In November 2022, a video in which a young woman shouted a pro-IRA chant while posing alongside Foster was condemned by politicians from the DUP, UUP, Alliance Party and SDLP, with Sinn Féin Vice President Michelle O'Neill saying it was "wrong".

Amanda Sloat, a special assistant to United States President Joe Biden, hit back in April 2023 at claims made by Foster that Biden "hates the United Kingdom".

In May 2023, Foster said she believed the DUP could enter into a coalition with the Labour Party after the general election.

On 11 July 2023, Foster gave evidence to the UK-wide COVID-19 inquiry. She used the platform to state that the UK government should have stepped in to make decisions in the absence of ministers at Stormont. Foster reappeared in front of the inquiry on 15 May 2024 and rejected suggestions that the Northern Ireland Executive "sleepwalked" into the pandemic.

On 31 January 2024, Foster stated she hoped the deal to restore power-sharing at Stormont would be acceptable to unionists.

During a visit to Jersey with her pro-unionist organisation Together UK in May 2024, Foster dismissed the prospect of a united Ireland saying "there are nowhere near enough people to take us out of the United Kingdom".

In May 2024, it was confirmed that Foster would be appointed chairperson of Intertrade UK, a new body to promote trade within the UK which was announced as part of the UK government package to restore devolution. She assumed the role on 19 September 2024.

On 2 July 2024, Foster slammed the Alliance Party for "extreme ideology" in a criticism of "progressive parties" ahead of the 2024 United Kingdom general election.

In response to the 2024 United Kingdom riots in Northern Ireland, Foster rejected what she called the "labelling" of some white working-class people in Belfast "as Nazis".

Foster suggested in August 2024 that Members of Parliament (MPs) should be paid more, saying that while their £91,346 salary is very good, "it's not huge".

In October 2024, it was reported that Foster has been advertising herself for hire through a public speaking agency as a renewable energy expert at a cost of more than £10,000 a day despite her involvement in the RHI scandal.

Speaking to Michael Gove on a Radio 4 podcast in October 2024, Foster confirmed that a row over conversion therapy was the "straw that broke the camel's back", when it came to her being ousted as leader of the DUP. She had abstained on a vote in the Northern Ireland Assembly calling for a ban on gay conversion therapy while the majority of her party voted against the motion. Foster also branded the decision to rule out a border on the island of Ireland during Brexit negotiations a "mistake".

In January 2025, Foster was one of seven MPs and peers from Northern Ireland, along with more than 160 other parliamentarians, to call for the England men's cricket team to boycott a match against Afghanistan due to the Taliban regime's oppression of women.

Foster chaired her first meeting of Intertrade UK on 28 February 2025.

== Personal life ==
Arlene Foster married her husband Brian, nephew of the Ulster Unionist Party politician Sam Foster, on 24 August 1995 in Lisnaskea. They have three children, a daughter and two sons. In 2008, she was recognised as Assembly member of the year at the Women in Public Life Awards. She and her family live on the outskirts of Brookeborough, a village in the east of County Fermanagh. Foster is a member of the Church of Ireland.

In 2020, Foster successfully sued TV doctor Christian Jessen for defamation over his claim of a relationship with a protection officer. Jessen, a presenter on the Channel 4 show Embarrassing Bodies, with over 300,000 Twitter followers, sent a first tweet on 23 December 2019, which was retweeted over 500 times and subsequently sent further "aggravating" tweets. On 27 May 2021, Mr Justice McAlinden ordered Dr Jessen to pay damages of £125,000 and Foster's legal costs.

== See also ==
- Demography and politics of Northern Ireland

Northern Ireland Assembly
Preceded by Joan Carson	Member of the Legislative Assembly for Fermanagh and South Tyrone; 2003–2021	Succeeded by Deborah Erskine
Political offices
Vacant Office suspended Title last held by Dermot Nesbitt	Minister for the Environment; 2007–2008	Succeeded by Sammy Wilson
Preceded by Nigel Dodds	Minister for Enterprise and Investment; 2008–2015	Succeeded by Jonathan Bell
Preceded by Simon Hamilton	Minister for Finance and Personnel; 2015–2016	Succeeded by Mervyn Storey
Preceded by Peter Robinson	First Minister of Northern Ireland; 2016–2017; 2020–2021	Succeeded by Paul Givan
Party political offices
Preceded by Peter Robinson	Leader of the Democratic Unionist Party; 2015–2021	Succeeded by Edwin Poots
