= Attorney General's Office (United Kingdom) =

Ministerial department of the UK Government

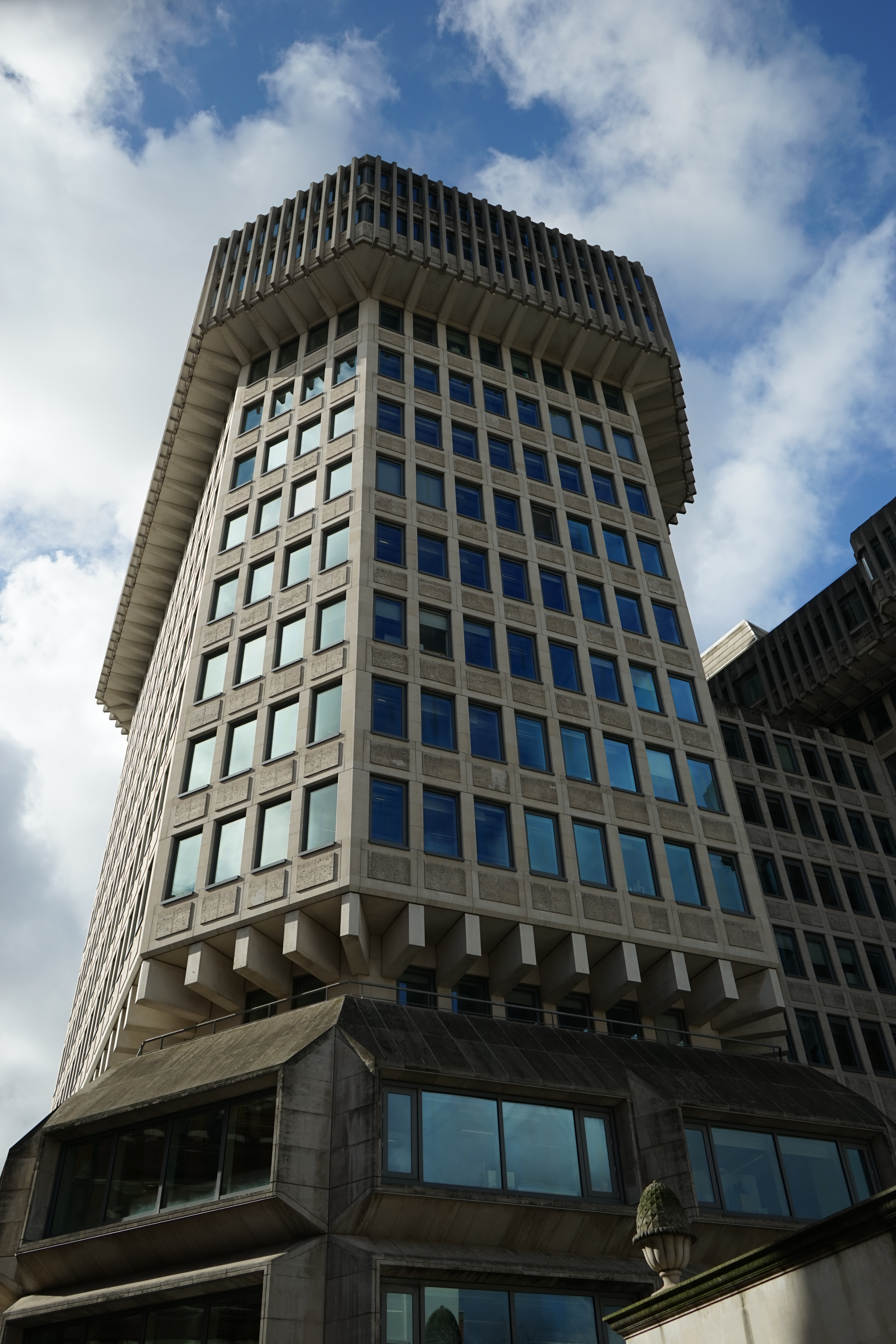

Department overview
- Jurisdiction: United Kingdom, mainly England and Wales and Northern Ireland
- Headquarters: 102 Petty France, London, England
- Annual budget: £600 million & no capital expenditure for Law Officers' Departments in 2017/18
- Ministers responsible: Ellie Reeves MP, Attorney General for England and Wales; Andy Slaughter MP, Solicitor General for England and Wales
- Department executive: Douglas Wilson, Director General
- Website: gov.uk/ago

The Attorney General's Office (AGO) is a ministerial department of the Government of the United Kingdom. It supports the Attorney General and their deputy, the Solicitor General (together, the Law officers of the Crown in England and Wales). It is sometimes referred to as the Legal Secretariat to the Law Officers.

The administration and expenditure of the Attorney General's Office are scrutinised by the Justice Select Committee.

== Organisation ==
The AGO is one of the smallest UK government departments, with around 60 staff. It is one of "the Law Officers’ Departments" along with the Crown Prosecution Service (CPS) and HM Crown Prosecution Service Inspectorate (HMCPSI), the Serious Fraud Office (SFO) and the Government Legal Department. The Treasury Solicitor acts as Accounting Officer for the AGO.

The AGO provides legal advice and support to the Law Officers who themselves provide legal advice to the government, and works with the Ministry of Justice and the Home Office to develop criminal justice policy.

== Ministers ==
The Law Officers in England and Wales are as follows, with Cabinet attendees in bold:

Minister	Portrait	Rank	Portfolio
**Ellie Reeves** MP		Attorney General; Advocate General for Northern Ireland	Chief legal adviser to the Crown; responsible for superintending Law Officers' departments (Crown Prosecution Service, Government Legal Department, Serious Fraud Office, and HM Crown Prosecution Service Inspectorate); specific statutory duty to oversee the Director of Public Prosecutions and Director of the Serious Fraud Office; principal government legal adviser on public law, international law, human rights, and devolution; public interest functions; questions of law arising on Bills and legal policy; oversight of all legal issues involving the government domestically and internationally; and promotion of the rule of law.
Andy Slaughter MP		Solicitor General	Supports the attorney general in delegated matters, including superintendence of Law Officers' departments and promoting public interest and the rule of law.

== See also ==
- Attorney General for England and Wales
