= Glossary of Brexit terms =

In the wake of the referendum held in the United Kingdom on 23 June 2016, many new pieces of Brexit-related jargon entered popular use.

The word "Brexit" was named as Word of the Year 2016 by the publishers of Collins English Dictionary.

== A ==
Article 50
Article 50 of the Treaty on European Union specifies the procedure of withdrawing from the European Union. It was introduced in the Treaty of Lisbon from 2009. Under the process, once the formal notification has been sent, the withdrawing state and the European Union have a two-year deadline to negotiate a withdrawal agreement. After that time, unless an extension has been agreed or the withdrawing state revokes its intention to withdraw, the membership ends regardless of whether or not an agreement was reached. If an agreement has been reached before the deadline, the withdrawing state may end their membership at any time before the deadline. On 29 March 2017, UK Prime Minister Theresa May triggered the procedure.

Australian-style deal
A euphemism popularised by Boris Johnson to refer to a no-deal Brexit in which the United Kingdom would be placed in the same position in relation to the European Union as Australia which did not possess an existing trade agreement. The term WTO rules has a similar meaning referring to the default provisions governing international trade under rules set by the World Trade Organization (WTO).

== B ==
Backstop
See Irish backstop

Blind Brexit
A scenario where the UK leaves the EU without clarity on the terms of a future trade deal. EU and British negotiators would then have until 31 December 2020 to complete a future trade deal. During this transition period the UK would effectively be treated as an EU member in many areas, but with the right to negotiate international trade agreements and no voting rights in the EU. Also known as a "Blindfold Brexit".

Bremain
A portmanteau of "British" and "remain"; used to refer to the option in the 2016 referendum to remain in the EU.

Brexit
Brexit (like its early variant, Brixit) is a portmanteau of "British" and "exit". Grammatically, it has been called a complex nominal. The first attestation in the Oxford English Dictionary is a Euractiv blog post by Peter Wilding on 15 May 2012. It was coined by analogy with "Grexit", attested on 6 February 2012 to refer to a hypothetical withdrawal of Greece from the eurozone (and possibly the EU altogether, although there was never a clear popular mandate for it). The UK membership of the European Union ended at 11 p.m. GMT on 31 January 2020, when a transition period began until the end of 2020 for UK and EU to negotiate further treaty arrangements in respect of their future trading relationship.

Brexit day

31 January 2020, the day the UK ceased to be a member of the EU. The date was originally set for 29 March 2019 at 11 p.m. GMT, but was moved three times: first to either 12 April or 22 May, depending on whether or not a withdrawal agreement was ratified; then to 1 July or 31 October, depending on whether or not the UK held European Parliament elections; and finally to 31 January 2020.

Brexiteer/Brexiter
See Leaver

Brextremist
portmanteau of "Brexiter" and "Extremist", a pejorative term used by some outlets to describe Leavers of an overzealous, uncompromising disposition.

Brexshit
A derogatory variant of Brexit, used chiefly by its opponents. It is a portmanteau of the terms Brexit and shit (a profane word referring to faeces).

Brextension
A word coined to describe the extension granted until 31 January 2020 (a portmanteau of Brexit and extension).

== C ==
Canada plus/Canada model
This is shorthand for a proposal in which the UK signs a free trade agreement with the EU. This would allow the UK to control its own trade policy as opposed to jointly negotiating alongside the EU, but would require rules of origin agreements to be reached for UK–EU trade. It is likely this would lead to UK–EU trade being less "free" than joining the European Free Trade Association (EFTA), and result in additional border controls being required, which is an issue of contention, particularly on the island of Ireland. The Canadian–EU deal took seven years to negotiate, but some Brexiteers argued it would take much less time between the UK and EU as the two participants already align on regulatory standards. (Others aimed for regulatory divergence as a matter of principle.)

Chequers plan
A July 2018 white paper by the UK government, setting out its wishes for the UK's future relationship with EU. The plan was agreed at a cabinet meeting at Chequers, and caused a number of resignations. When the UK and EU agreed a draft withdrawal agreement and the related political declaration in November 2018, the Chequers plan was superseded by that political declaration.

Clean break Brexit
See No-deal Brexit. This term is used primarily by proponents of a no-deal Brexit, in particular the Brexit Party. Also known as "clean brexit".

Customs union
See EU Customs Union

== D ==
Divorce bill
The UK agreed to settle outstanding financial commitments that it had approved while a member of the EU. The amount owed is officially referred to as the financial settlement but has informally been referred to as an exit bill or divorce bill. The UK's Office for Budget Responsibility estimate of the amount at the original planned date of Brexit in March 2019 was £38 billion. Following delay of the UK's exit until 31 January 2020, after normal member contributions payable up to that date, a final settlement of £33 billion was estimated. This estimate was updated in July 2024 to £30.2 billion.

== E ==
EU customs union
The customs union of the EU: an agreement that members do not impose taxes on goods imported from one another, and have a common tariff for goods imported from non-members countries. Being in a customs union facilitates trade and economic cooperation, but leaving the EU customs union allows the UK to conduct its own trade policy. In the 2019 withdrawal agreement, all of the UK will leave the EU customs union, which creates a de jure customs border on the Republic of Ireland–Northern Ireland border. In practice, customs checks will be performed at ports and airports in Northern Ireland, and taxes will be paid for goods that are "at risk" of being moved from Northern Ireland into the Republic of Ireland.
See also Irish Sea border, Northern Ireland Protocol, Windsor Framework, and Brexit and the Irish border.

Exit day
See also Brexit day
UK domestic law has defined "exit day" for the purpose of dealing with the domestic consequences of Brexit, but the date is not formally linked to UK's departure from the EU.

== F ==
Fish for finance
The juxtapositioning in post-Brexit negotiations of EU access to UK natural resources on the one hand and UK access to the EU financial services market on the other. Fishermen in the eight European countries whose waters border the UK's would like to maintain something close to the level of access they have enjoyed under the EU Common Fisheries Policy, as they depend heavily on many species found in the UK's rich waters, while British fishermen want the European presence in UK waters to be limited. At the same time, UK financial institutions would like to keep the access they presently have to customers in the EU as it currently accounts for a significant part of their business, while the EU wants to make sure Britain's regulations are as strict as its own before it allows this.

Flextension
A "flextension" was how the House of Commons Library described the first extension made to the Article 50 period. That extension was until 22 May 2019 if the Theresa May Withdrawal Agreement was approved by the House of Commons, otherwise it was until 12 April.
A "flextension" was also how European Council president Donald Tusk characterised the extension to 31 January 2020, which allows the UK to leave before the deadline, on the first of any month, if by then a deal has been approved by the UK and European parliaments.

== H ==
Hard and soft Brexit
"Hard Brexit" and "soft Brexit" are unofficial terms that are commonly used by news media to describe the prospective relationship between the UK and the EU after withdrawal. A hard Brexit usually refers to the UK leaving the EU and the European Single Market with few or no deals (trade or otherwise) in place, meaning that trade will be conducted under the World Trade Organization's rules, and services will no longer be provided by agencies of the European Union (such as aviation safety). Soft Brexit encompasses any deal that involves retaining membership in the European Single Market and at least some free movement of people according to European Economic Area (EEA) rules. Theresa May's "Chequers agreement" embraced some aspects of a "soft" Brexit. Note that the EEA and the deal with Switzerland contain fully free movement of people, and that the EU has wanted that to be included in a deal with UK on fully free trade.

Hard border
An Ireland–Northern Ireland border with physical border installations. The UK and EU both desire to prevent a hard border, but finding a way to achieve this has proved difficult. A hard border is feared because it might endanger the Good Friday Agreement that in 1998 ended the Northern Ireland conflict. With both Ireland and the UK a member of the EU, customs checks were not necessary, and the Good Friday Agreement removed security checks at the border. The draft withdrawal agreement, as updated in October 2019, avoids a hard border by keeping Northern Ireland aligned with some EU regulation, while performing customs checks at the Irish Sea border.

== I ==
Indicative vote
Indicative votes are votes by members of parliament on a series of non-binding resolutions. They are a means of testing the will of the House of Commons on different options relating to one issue. MPs voted on eight different options for the next steps in the Brexit process on 27 March 2019; however, none of the proposals earned a majority in the indicative votes. MPs also voted on four options on 1 April 2019 in the second round of indicative votes. Still, none of the proposals earned a majority.

Implementation period
The period ending on 31 December 2020 at 11 p.m. GMT, as stated in section 39 of European Union (Withdrawal Agreement) Bill 2019–20. The UK-EU withdrawal agreement uses the wording transition period, while the EEA-UK separation agreement has implementation period.

Irish backstop
An "insurance policy" intended to prevent a hard border between Ireland and Northern Ireland, and thus respecting the Good Friday Agreement. It was included in the 2018 draft withdrawal agreement, and would come in force if no solution to the Irish border problem was found during the transition period. Under the plan, the UK would remain in a customs union with the EU, while Northern Ireland and, to a lesser extent, the rest of the UK would follow additional EU rules. The backstop was controversial because critics feared it would bind the UK to the EU for an indefinite time, and the UK could not withdraw from it unilaterally. In October 2019, the withdrawal agreement was revised, and the Irish backstop was replaced with the Article 18 of the Northern Ireland Protocol which provides for a four-year period in which Northern Ireland would remain aligned with certain EU laws. This arrangement can be extended for further four-year periods for as long as the Northern Ireland Assembly assents by simple majority vote.

== L ==
Leaver
Those supporting Brexit are sometimes referred to as "Leavers". Alternatively the term "Brexiteers", or "Brexiters" has been used to describe adherents of the Leave campaign.

Level playing field
A collective term referring to the proposed commitment to abiding by common environmental, labour and social standards set in EU law as a pre-condition for British access to the Single Market under a prospective trade deal. It is determined by the commitment to avoiding regulatory arbitrage that might bestow an undue competitive advantage to British firms.

Lexit
Also Lexiter. A portmanteau of left-wing and Brexit, referring to left-wing advocacy of EU withdrawal.

== M ==
Meaningful vote
A meaningful vote is a vote under section 13 of the European Union (Withdrawal) Act 2018, requiring the government to arrange for a motion proposing approval of the outcome of negotiations with the EU to be debated and voted on by the House of Commons before the European Parliament decides whether it consents to the withdrawal agreement being concluded on behalf of the EU in accordance with Article 50(2) of the Treaty on European Union.

Managed no-deal
"Managed no-deal Brexit", or "managed no deal Brexit", was increasingly used near the end of 2018, in respect of the complex series of political, legal and technical decisions needed if there is no withdrawal agreement treaty with the EU when the UK exits under the Article 50 withdrawal notice. The Institute for Government has advised that the concept is unrealistic.

== N ==
No-deal Brexit
This means the UK would leave the European Union without a withdrawal agreement, and/or without a trade deal with the EU.

Northern Ireland Protocol
The 'Protocol on Ireland/Northern Ireland', commonly abbreviated to the 'Northern Ireland Protocol', is a protocol to the Brexit withdrawal agreement that governs the unique customs and immigration issues at the border on the island of Ireland between the United Kingdom of Great Britain and Northern Ireland and the European Union, and on some aspects of trade in goods between Northern Ireland and the rest of the United Kingdom.

Norway model/Norway-plus model
The 'Norway model' is shorthand for a model where the United Kingdom leaves the European Union but becomes a member of the European Free Trade Association (EFTA) and the European Economic Area. EFTA and EEA membership would allow the UK to remain in the single market but without having to be subject to the Common Fisheries Policy, Common Agricultural Policy, and the European Court of Justice (ECJ). The UK would be subject to the EFTA court for interstate disputes, which largely shadows the ECJ, would have to transfer a large amount of EU law into UK law, and would no longer have any direct say on shaping new EU rules (some of which the UK would be obliged to transpose into UK law). The UK would also retain reciprocal freedom of movement between the EU and UK, which was seen as a key issue of contention in the referendum.

The 'Norway-plus model' proposed a similar but closer relationship with the EU: this proposed in addition that the UK would join the European Union Customs Union.

== P ==
People's Vote
An advocacy group launched in April 2018 which calls for a second referendum on the final Brexit deal. The People's Vote march is part of a series of demonstrations against Brexit.

Political declaration
A document setting out the intended future relationship between the UK and EU. The declaration formed the basis for the trade agreement negotiations that started once the UK left the EU. Unlike the withdrawal agreement which is a legally binding treaty, the political declaration had no legal force.

== R ==
Rejoiner
Those in favour of the UK rejoining the EU are sometimes referred to as "Rejoiners".

Remainer
Those in favour of the UK remaining in the EU are often referred to as "Remainers".

Remoaner
Portmanteau of "Remainer" and "moan", used pejoratively by Leavers to describe a subset of Remainers, especially those that criticised or campaigned to undo the result after the referendum.

== S ==
Scexit
An alternative term for Scottish independence, portmanteau of Scotland and exit derived from Brexit.

Second referendum
A second referendum has been proposed by a number of politicians and pressure groups. The Electoral Commission has the responsibility for nominating lead campaign groups for each possible referendum outcome.

Singapore-on-Thames
A model for the post-Brexit British economy that proposes that the UK deregulate and offer businesses a lower tax burden as an alternative to the EU, much like Singapore does in Asia.

Slow Brexit
The term "slow Brexit" was first coined by Prime Minister Theresa May on 25 March 2019 as she spoke to Parliament, warning MPs that Article 50 could be extended beyond 22 May, slowing down the Brexit process. A 'slow Brexit' implies a longer period of political uncertainty in which members of Parliament will debate a sequence of steps of Britain's departure from the European Union.

== T ==
Take back control:

- A pro-Brexit phrase implying that Britain's sovereignty and ability to make its own laws had been lost by its membership of the EU and would return after withdrawal.

== W ==
Windsor Framework
The 'Windsor Framework' is a post-Brexit legal agreement between the EU and the UK, designed to address problems with the movement of goods from Great Britain to Northern Ireland (and thus to the EU Single Market) arising from the Northern Ireland Protocol.

Withdrawal agreement
A treaty between the UK and the EU, setting out the terms for the UK's withdrawal. The first version was agreed in November 2018 but was rejected by the UK parliament three times. The agreement contained the contentious Irish backstop, which was one of the reasons for opposition to it. The failed ratification led to the resignation of the UK prime minister, Theresa May, and her successor Boris Johnson sought to renegotiate it despite the EU's refusal to do so. In October 2019, the EU and the new UK government agreed a new version of the withdrawal agreement, with the backstop replaced by a different solution to the Irish border problem. The new agreement passed its second reading in the House of Commons in December 2019, following a general election in which the Conservatives won a decisive majority.
