= Brexit and the Irish border =

Effect on Ireland's UK/EU border

The border between the United Kingdom and the European Union in Ireland

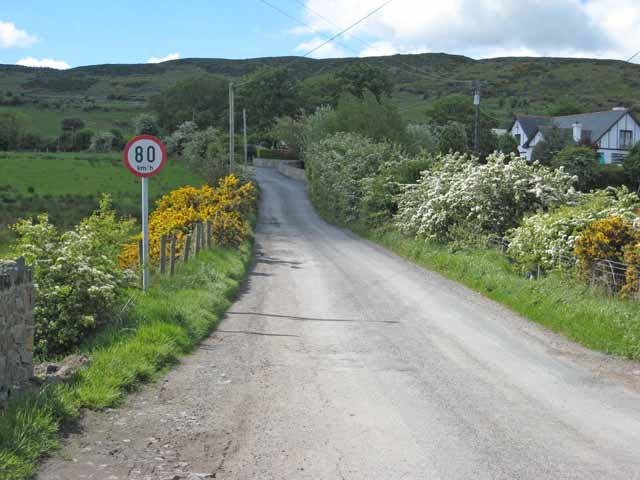
The UK–Republic of Ireland border crosses this road at Killeen (near Newry), marked only by a speed limit in km/h (Northern Ireland uses mph).

The impact of Brexit on the Irish border and its adjacent polities involves changes in trade, customs, immigration checks, local economies, services, recognition of qualifications, medical cooperation, and other matters, as it is the only land border between the United Kingdom and the European Union. (Note: The effect on Gibraltar is analogous, though not the same as Gibraltar is not part of the United Kingdom.)

After the UK Parliament voted to leave the European Union, all parties said that they want to avoid a hard border in Ireland, due particularly to the border's historically sensitive nature. Border issues were one of three areas of focused negotiation in the Withdrawal Agreement. Following the United Kingdom's exit from the European Union on 31 January 2020, this border is also the frontier between the EU and an external country.

The Northern Ireland Protocol of the Brexit withdrawal agreement commits the UK and the EU to maintaining an open border in Ireland, so that (in many respects) the de facto frontier is the Irish Sea border between the two islands. This requires the continued application of the Common Travel Area as well as free trade of goods (including electricity) between Ireland and Northern Ireland. The latter requires the UK to apply European law in Northern Ireland with respect to these areas, with jurisdiction of the European Court of Justice in the interpretation of that law.

== Background ==
=== Irish independence ===
In 1922, the 26-county Irish Free State (Note: Subsequently renamed as Ireland (Irish: Éire) in 1937, also known since 1948 as the Republic of Ireland.) formally seceded from the United Kingdom as a self-governing dominion under the terms of the Anglo-Irish Treaty, setting the stage for full national independence, while the six-county Northern Ireland remained part of the United Kingdom. Consequently, the dividing line between these two parts of the island became an international border. Trade in goods and services across this frontier became subject to differing tax and tariff arrangements and an infrastructure of customs posts was put in place at designated crossing points. All traffic was subject to inspection by the jurisdiction it was entering. This could entail full vehicle searches with consequent delay and inconvenience. However, passport checks were not applied because the Republic of Ireland and Northern Ireland were part of the Common Travel Area.

=== Closer links ===
A number of bilateral and multilateral free trade agreements made goods checks less intrusive; the completion of the European Single Market in 1992 meant that checks on goods were phased out. However, during the Troubles (Note: From the 1960s - 1998) in Northern Ireland, there were British military checkpoints on main border crossings and UK security forces made some, although not all, of the remaining crossings impassable. In 2005, in a phased implementation of the 1998 Good Friday Agreement, the last of the border checkpoints was removed.

=== Good Friday Agreement ===
The British and Irish Governments: (...)
(...)
Wishing to develop still further the unique relationship between their peoples and the close co-operation between their countries as friendly neighbours and as partners in the European Union;
(...)
Reaffirming their commitment to the principles of partnership, equality and mutual respect and to the protection of civil, political, social, economic and cultural rights in their respective jurisdictions;
Have agreed as follows:

— British-Irish Agreement (appended to the Good Friday Agreement)

Since about 2005, the border has been perceived as being invisible, with little or no physical infrastructure, as the security barriers and checkpoints were removed due to processes put in place by the Good Friday Agreement (or Belfast Agreement) signed in 1998. (Note: See section "Security" of the Agreement) This agreement has the status of both an international treaty between the United Kingdom and the Republic of Ireland (the British-Irish Agreement), as well as an agreement of the parties within Northern Ireland (Multi-Party Agreement).

Following Brexit, the border between Northern Ireland and the Republic of Ireland becomes an external EU border. In theory, a "hard" border could return, with both fewer and supervised crossing posts, to support the necessary customs infrastructure. Both EU and UK negotiating teams made clear that this outcome would not be acceptable in any final exit agreement.

US Senator George Mitchell, who chaired the negotiations for the Belfast Agreement, has commented that he believes the creation of a border control system between the Republic of Ireland and Northern Ireland might jeopardise the agreement. Research published on 18 February 2019 by Irish Senator Mark Daly and two UNESCO chairmen indicated that reinstating a hard border would result in the return of violence.

=== Brexit referendum in Northern Ireland ===
In the June 2016 United Kingdom European Union membership referendum, Northern Ireland voted 55.8% to 44.2% in favour of remaining in the European Union. Support for remaining or leaving was largely divided along sectarian lines, with a majority in Catholic areas favouring Remain and a majority in Protestant areas favouring Leave. In a November 2018 opinion poll commissioned by BBC Northern Ireland and RTÉ (Republic of Ireland), 61% of those polled believed that Brexit should not go ahead if the price is a hard border (versus 36% that it should, 3% don't know).

=== Hard border ===
External EU frontiers under different trade and customs regimes. All are "hard borders" in this context.

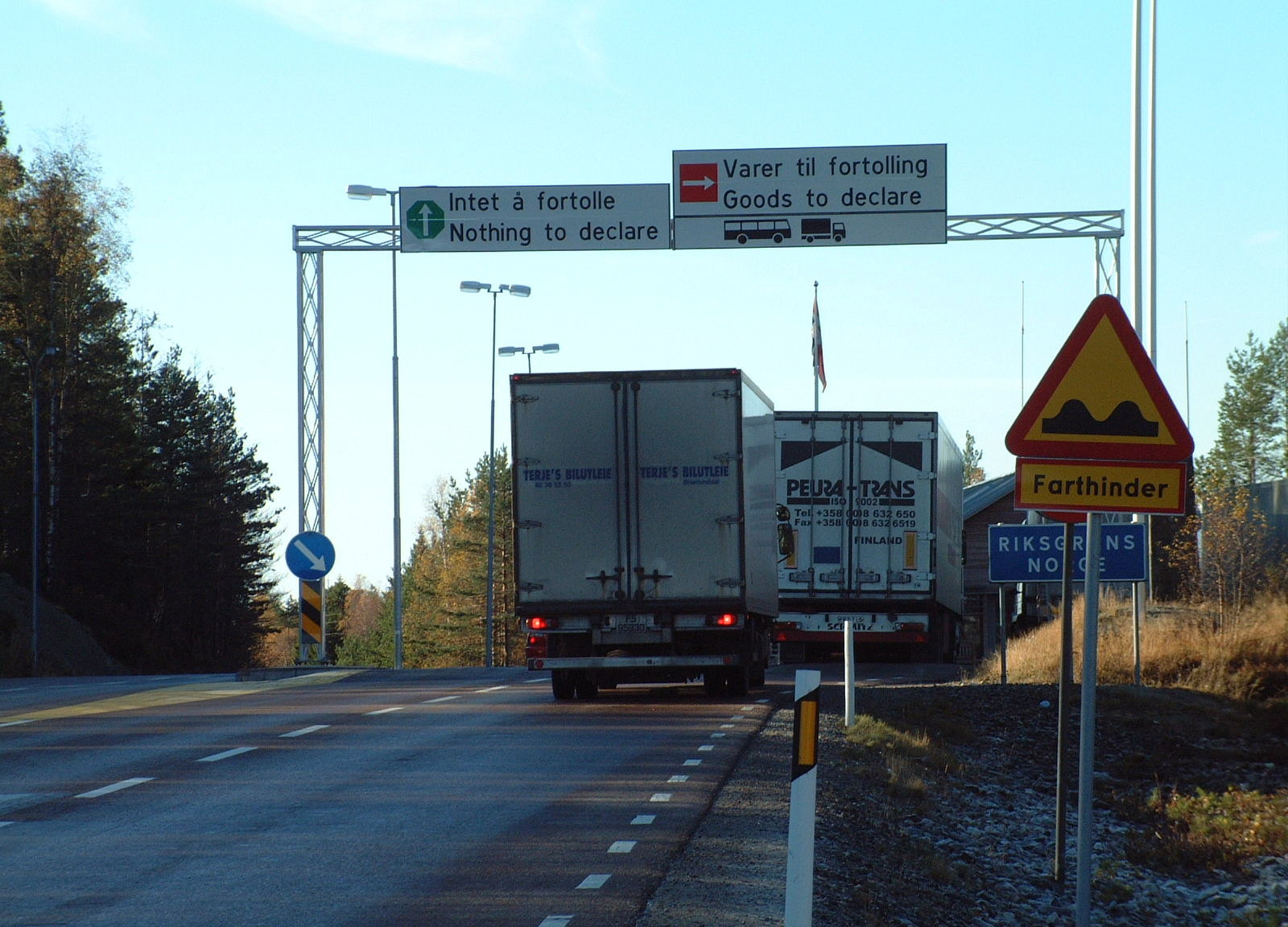
Norway–Sweden border (European Economic Area, selective border control and random customs checks. Both in Schengen Area and Single Market.)

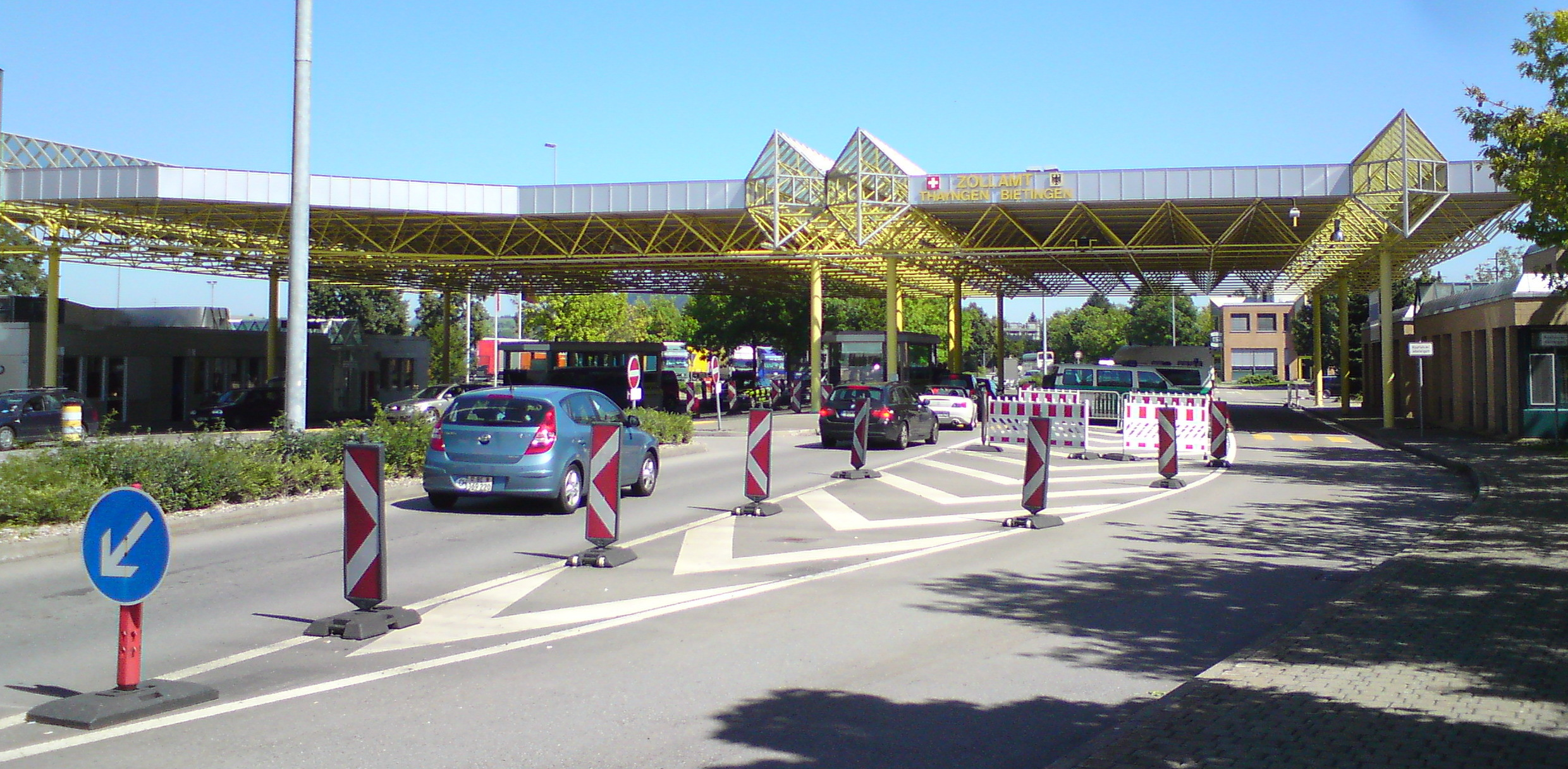
Germany–Switzerland border (EU–CH treaties, no border control, but random customs and immigration checks. Both in Schengen Area and Single Market.)

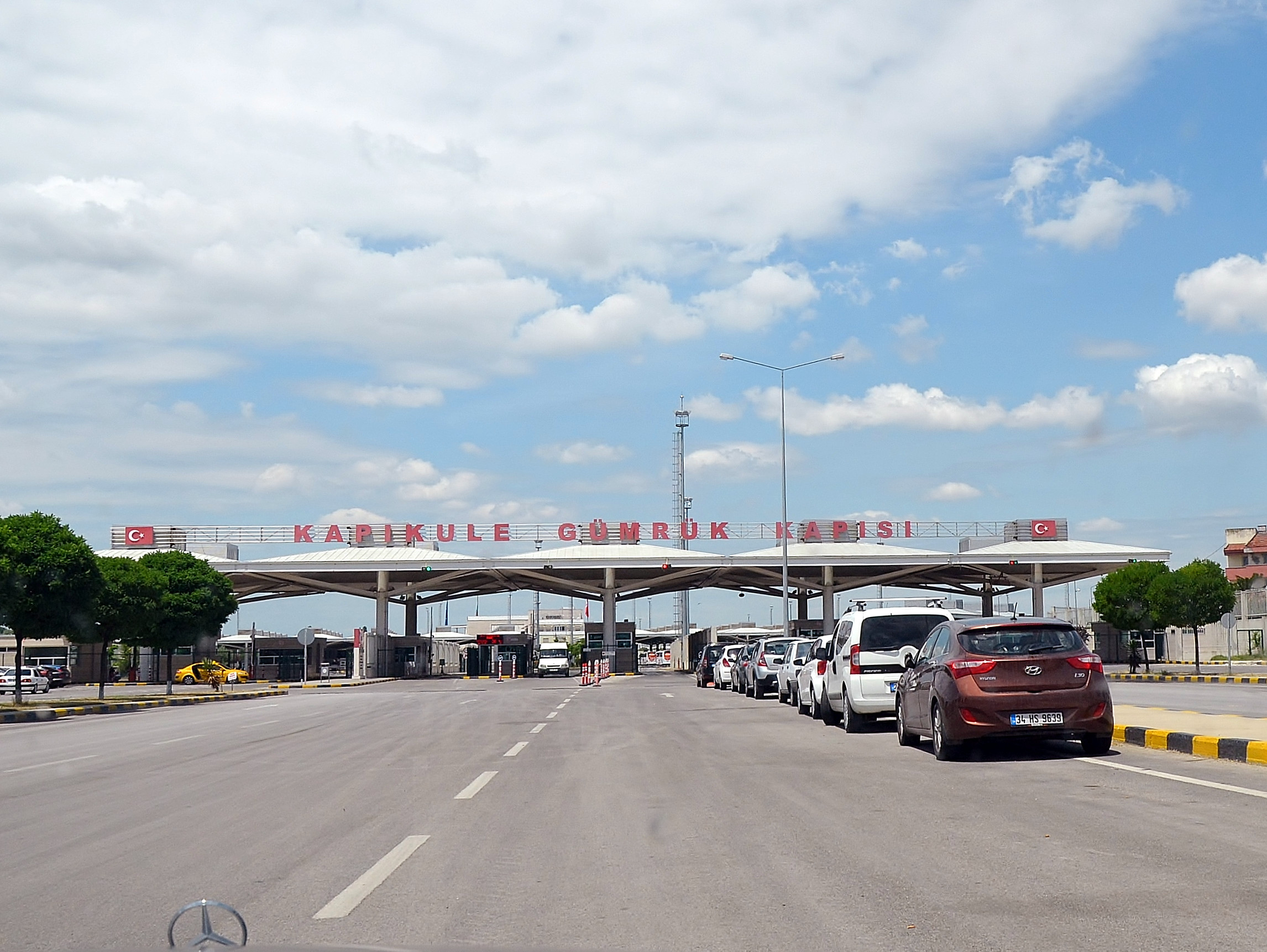
Bulgaria–Turkey border (EU-TR Customs Union (partial), full border and customs control, visa required for Turkish nationals)

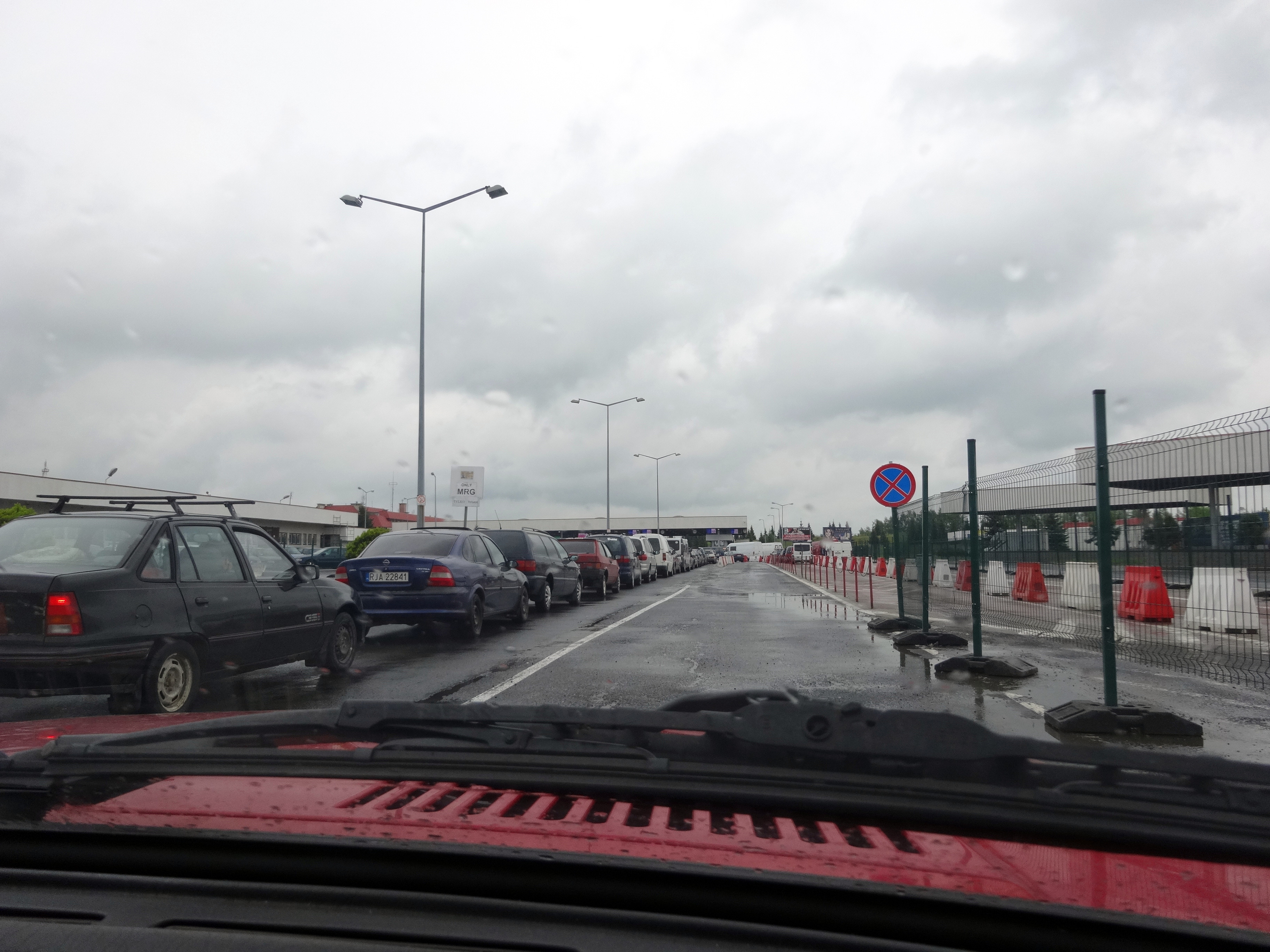
Poland–Ukraine border (Deep and Comprehensive Free Trade Area, full border and customs control, visas may be required)

In the context of Brexit, a "hard border" means one where there is a limited number of authorised (and physically controlled) crossing points, staffed by customs officers and police, supported in times of tension by military forces. Drivers of vehicles crossing are required to declare goods in carriage, commercial carriers must produce bills of lading and evidence that the goods comply with the minimum standards of the territory being entered. Tariffs (in the form of customs duty) may be payable. This was the position that pertained on the border from 1923 until the Single European Act in 1993. (In this context, a "hard border" does not mean a fortified border but, during the Troubles, British security forces blocked many unapproved crossings for security reasons. Under the terms of the Common Travel Area agreement, British and Irish citizens are free to cross the border without any passport controls).

== Withdrawal negotiations ==
=== Positions on the Irish border ===
==== United Kingdom ====
The UK government has said that Brexit will not mean a return of the hard border. According to statements in 2016 by the then UK Prime Minister Theresa May and Irish Taoiseach Enda Kenny, it is intended to maintain this arrangement after the United Kingdom leaves the EU.

In September 2016, the (then) UK Brexit Secretary, David Davis, stated that the UK government would not seek a return to a hard border between the UK and the Republic of Ireland.

In October 2016, The Guardian reported that British proposals to avoid a hard border, by 'seeking to shift the frontline of [British] immigration controls to Ireland's ports and airports', had received "signals [of] support" by some members of Enda Kenny's government. However, by 2017, a spokesperson for the new Irish government, under Leo Varadkar, stated that these reports had been "misinformed", and that there was "no question of UK officials acting as border agents in Ireland".

In its white paper on Brexit, the United Kingdom government reiterated its commitment to the Good Friday Agreement. With regard to Northern Ireland's status, it said that the UK government's "clearly-stated preference is to retain Northern Ireland's current constitutional position: as part of the UK, but with strong links to Ireland".

==== Republic of Ireland ====
The Irish Government's position has been to reduce public mention of border checks to avoid confrontation with opposition parties in the Dáil and to calm nationalist and unionist concerns in Northern Ireland. Repeated statements have been made by senior politicians in government denying plans are being made for a hard border. Concerns have been raised by opposition parties that the government is not being forthright about the risk of, and planning for, a hard border. A private admonishment by Tánaiste Simon Coveney of Minister for Transport Shane Ross in the wake of a press conference was caught on the live microphones. In reference to border checks, Coveney stated, "We can’t get into where they’ll be at this stage. They could be in the sea. They could be...but once you start talking about checks anywhere near the border people will start delving into that and all of a sudden we’ll be the Government that re-introduced a physical border on the island of Ireland".

In a February 2019 Sky Data poll, 79% of respondents supported the Irish government holding out for a legal guarantee that there will be no hard border, even if it risks a no-deal Brexit on 29 March. In the same poll, 81% supported cutting economic ties with the UK if forced to choose, with 19% supporting cutting ties with the EU in favour of the UK to maintain the open border.

==== Northern Ireland ====
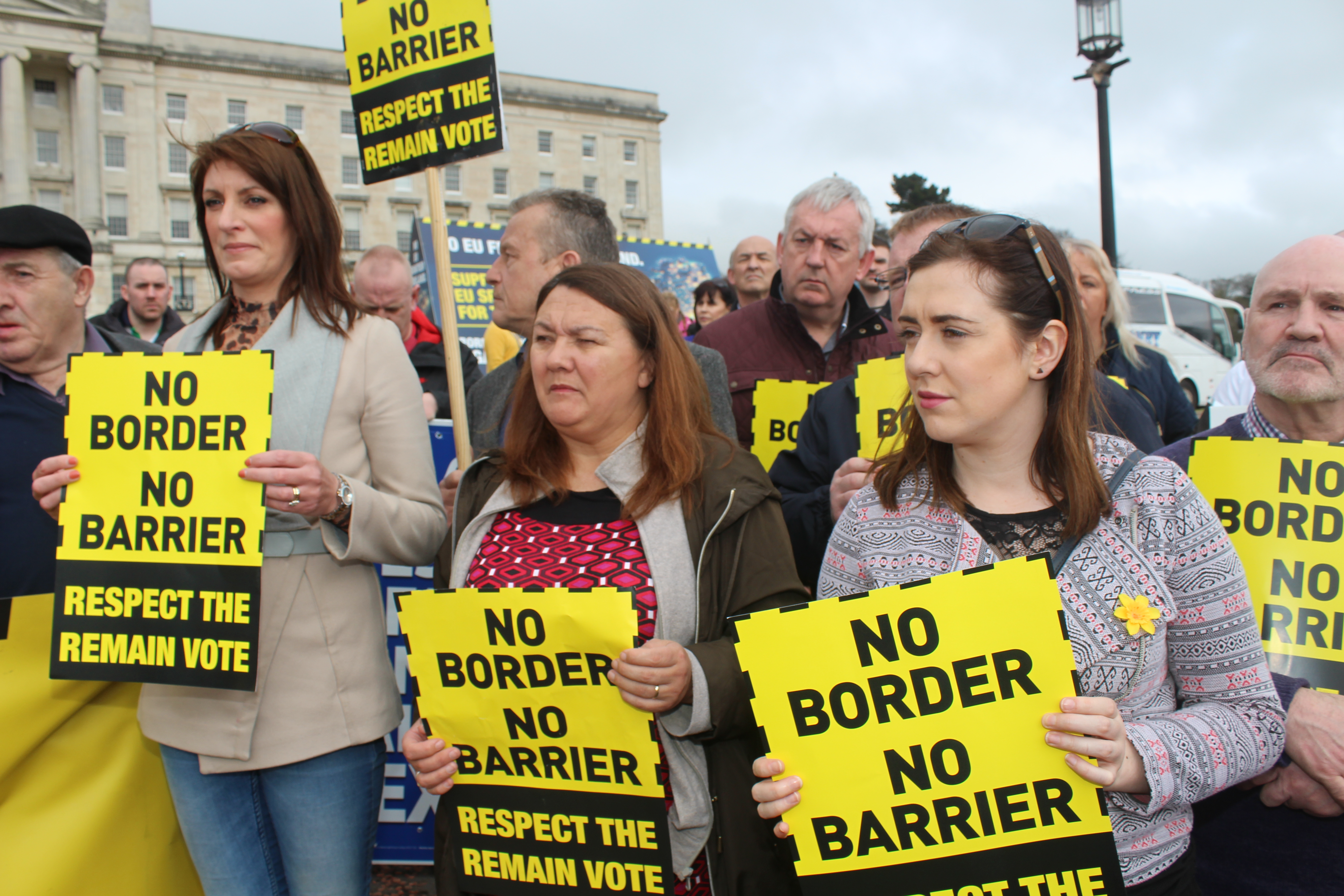
A Sinn Féin demonstrations against a hard border. Post-Brexit border controls are a controversial issue.

There have been worries among unionists that the Irish government's position is a covert attempt to gain more power over the region in order to promote a united Ireland, a position the Irish government has denied. The Democratic Unionist Party (DUP) opposes a hard Irish border and wishes to maintain the Common Travel Area. The DUP was the only major party of Northern Ireland to oppose the Good Friday Agreement.

A referendum on the reunification of Ireland was suggested by the Sinn Féin leader Martin McGuinness immediately after the Brexit referendum results were announced, a stance reiterated by the new party leader Mary Lou McDonald in 2018.

A week after the Brexit referendum the then First Minister of Northern Ireland, the DUP's Arlene Foster and Deputy First Minister Martin McGuinness issued a joint letter in which they said that the border must not become a catalyst for illegal activity or create an incentive for those who wish to undermine the peace process.

==== European Union ====
In April 2017, the European Council agreed that, in the event of a united Ireland, Northern Ireland could rejoin the EU under Ireland's existing membership.

In January 2019, German foreign minister Heiko Maas urged British MPs not to let the UK leave the EU without a deal, saying that "some people call us stubborn, but the truth is avoiding a hard border in Ireland is a fundamental concern for the EU, a union that more than anything else serves one purpose – to build and maintain peace in Europe". Nevertheless, the European Commission's chief spokesman Margaritis Schinas stated on 23 January that it is "obvious" that there would be a hard border were the United Kingdom to leave the EU without a deal.

In April 2019, former WTO director-general and European trade commissioner Pascal Lamy said that "staying in a customs union after Brexit won't resolve the Irish border issue... Leaving the single market reintroduces a border – the thickness of which depends on the degree of regulatory divergence."

=== Effect on the withdrawal negotiations ===
In the withdrawal negotiations, the Irish border issue was one of three (Note: The others are the outstanding British financial commitments to the EU budget and the rights of EU citizens in the UK (and vice versa).) areas that required a dedicated negotiation stream so as to achieve the withdrawal agreement that is required before the future relationship between the UK and EU can be agreed. The Irish and UK governments, as well as EU representatives, have stated that they do not wish for a hard border in Ireland, taking into account the historical and social "sensitivities" that permeate the island.

==== EU negotiating stance ====
Michel Barnier, the EU chief negotiator, indicated that he would look to the United Kingdom and Ireland for "solutions" to threats posed to Ireland's trading links, the Common Travel Area, and the Good Friday Agreement. Denying UK media reports that Ireland expects the effective border to become the Irish Sea, Irish Minister for Foreign Affairs Simon Coveney said that "the onus was on British officials to come up with an imaginative solution but [the Irish Government] would not support a proposal which would see a hard border return on Ireland".

==== Backstop proposal ====
The Irish backstop was a protocol in the (rejected) 2018 draft of the Withdrawal Agreement, that would have kept the United Kingdom (in general) in the European Union Customs Union and Northern Ireland (in particular) in some aspects of the European Single Market, until a solution is found to prevent a hard border. Its purpose was so as not to compromise the Good Friday Agreement and to maintain the integrity of the European Single Market. This would have come into operation only if there were no other solutions by the end of the (agreed) transition period, and would remain in place until such solutions were found and agreed to be practical. This proposal would have avoided the need for customs controls between Great Britain and Northern Ireland or between Northern Ireland and the Republic of Ireland (in other words, between the UK and the EU).

The Irish government supported the proposal. It had been strongly opposed by the Democratic Unionist Party as weakening Northern Ireland's place within the United Kingdom and is regarded as the main reason why Theresa May's withdrawal agreement was never approved by the British Parliament. The UK Parliament had already rejected an earlier proposal.

After further negotiations in autumn of 2019, an alternative model, the Ireland/Northern Ireland Protocol of the final Brexit withdrawal agreement was agreed between the UK and the EU. A brief summary of the later protocol is given below.

==== Resolution ====
In October 2019, the UK and the EU negotiators reached agreement on a revised protocol (see below) which resolved many of these issues by having Northern Ireland leave the EU de jure but with a de facto border between islands (Ireland and Great Britain) – nicknamed the "Irish Sea border".

In February 2022, the Stormont Executive collapsed when the Democratic Unionist Party walked out in protest against these post-Brexit trade arrangements for Northern Ireland.

In February 2024, Stormont resumed, after the DUP and the British Conservative Parties agreed that there would be no "routine" checks on goods between the UK and NI, but that there would still be spot checks, and that when UK government ministers are introducing new legislation, they will be compelled to tell Parliament if their Bill will have "significant adverse implications for Northern Ireland's place in the UK internal market".

Further, they agreed that changes to EU law will no longer automatically apply in Northern Ireland. Before the deal, it would have taken at least half of the Assembly members to object before EU law could be scrutinised.

In 2023, a post-Brexit negotiation resulted in the Windsor Framework, which the DUP accepted.

== Policy areas ==
=== Common Travel Area ===
In 1922, the United Kingdom and the newly established Irish Free State concluded a Common Travel Area (CTA) agreement. This gave British and Irish citizens the right to travel, live and work in either jurisdiction. Passport controls are not applied to travel between them. The freedom of movement provisions arising from membership of the EU to some degree superseded it, but the parties continued to keep their bilateral Agreement alive, despite it having no treaty status. In 2011, the British and Irish Governments agreed informally to continue their common controls on entry to the CTA for non-EEA nationals.

In September 2018, the British government guaranteed that free movement of EU citizens across the UK–Ireland border would continue.

In December 2021, the House of Lords introduced an amendment to the Nationality and Borders Bill that would have exempted non-Irish citizens of the European Economic Area and Switzerland from the requirement to obtain an Electronic Travel Authorisation before entering Northern Ireland from the Republic. It was voted down by the House of Commons by a majority of 298 to 216

=== Customs and VAT ===
Former UK Prime Minister John Major argued in 2018 that Brexit might lead to a hard border since the European Union and the UK need to control their borders for customs purposes. The European Research Group faction of the Conservative Party suggested in 2018 that the UK might have the choice between not controlling its border if VAT is not enforced, or controlling the border in order to apply possible VAT on imported goods post-Brexit.

In October 2018, the National Audit Office warned that it was already too late to prepare the necessary Irish border security checks in the event of a no-deal Brexit in March 2019 – a weakness that organised crime would be quick to exploit.

In March 2019, the UK government announced that it would not perform customs checks at the Irish border after a no-deal Brexit. The plan was quickly dubbed a "smuggler's charter", and criticised for likely breaching WTO rules. Local businesses expressed severe concerns.

On 17 October 2019, a revised withdrawal agreement that replaced the backstop with a new protocol was agreed by the EU leaders and Boris Johnson. In essence, this draft would de facto keep Northern Ireland in the EU Customs Union and Single Market for goods (including adoption of EU VAT) whilst allowing Great Britain to diverge. In December 2019, the UK Labour Party announced that it had obtained a HM Treasury paper using the Freedom of Information Act 2000 that appears to show that the Prime Minister's draft agreement would require some kinds of customs controls in both directions between Great Britain and Northern Ireland.

=== Fisheries ===
The border reaches the sea at two inlets: Lough Foyle in the northwest and Carlingford Lough in the east. In the century since Ireland became independent, it and the UK have never defined where in those channels the border is. Both inlets are fished by boats of both nations. During Britain's EU membership there was no need to resolve the issue, as the Common Fisheries Policy (CFP) gave all EU member states the rights to fish in each other's waters, and neighboring states further had the right to fish within 12 nautical miles of each other's coasts, in certain areas.

Now that Britain is no longer in the EU, the CFP no longer applies to its waters; the UK has, under the United Nations Convention on the Law of the Sea, sole control over who it allows to fish its waters. Many British fishermen strongly supported Brexit with the goal of leaving the CFP and what they considered to be the favoritism it showed fishermen from other countries, who in many cases depend on the rich fisheries around the British Isles for species much sought after in their markets but disdained by most British consumers. They wanted the British government to fully exercise this power and limit, or bar outright, all EU boats from their waters, until a deal favorable to them is reached.

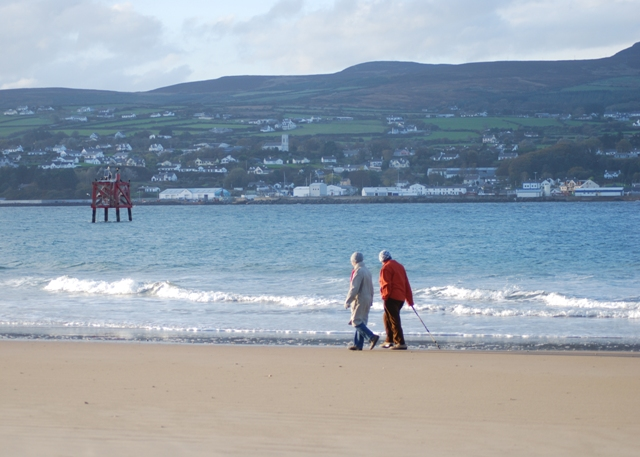
Irish fishing port of Greencastle, seen from Magilligan Point in Northern Ireland

On 24 December 2020, the UK and EU announced they had reached a deal. Its fishing provisions included a reduction in the EU's quotas in British waters to be phased in over the next five years, during three of which EU boats will continue to be allowed to fish in those inshore waters where they have been. Barrie Deas, head of the UK's National Federation of Fishing Organisations (NFFO), said that Johnson was "willing to sacrifice fishing" to get a deal and that the UK was entitled to even greater quotas than it had negotiated under international law. "I think there will be frustration and anger across the industry about that", he said. Fishing interests in the Republic of Ireland expressed concerns. Charlie McConalogue, the country's Minister for Agriculture, Food and the Marine, complained at the end of January, in advance of a March meeting to set quotas for the rest of the year, that the agreement had disproportionately affected the Republic, with the country's quota losses coming to twice that of any other EU member state, estimated by his government at €43 million. Sean O'Donoghue, head of the Killybegs Fishermen's Organisation, the Republic's largest fishing lobby group, believes it is closer to €188 million. He was particularly upset that the UK has been asserting sovereignty over the waters around the uninhabitable islet of Rockall, 200 miles west of the Outer Hebrides, waters rich in mackerel, the republic's most exported species, that largely mate and spawn in the republic's waters.

=== Health issues ===
Cooperation exists between the UK and Ireland on health matters, including the mutual recognition of qualifications. The Northern Ireland branch of the British Medical Association warned that a hard border "could risk patient care". The CEO of Cooperation and Working Together, a body that organises cross-border cooperation in health matters, suggested that the Norwegian model might be used. Along the Norway–Sweden border and other Nordic borders there is some cooperation on ambulance and helicopter pickup and on child birth clinics and some more, but otherwise health care is separated.

The EU–UK Trade and Cooperation Agreement ensures reciprocal healthcare arrangements continues.

=== International motor insurance ===
Article 7 of an EU insurance directive deals with national measures concerning vehicles normally based on the territory of third countries:

Each Member State shall take all appropriate measures to ensure that vehicles normally based in the territory of a third country which enter the territory in which the Treaty is in force shall not be used in its territory unless any loss or injury caused by those vehicles is covered, in accordance with the requirements of the laws of the various Member States on compulsory insurance against civil liability in respect of the use of vehicles, throughout the territory in which the Treaty is in force.

Commission Implementing Decision (EU) 2021/1145 of 30 June 2021 waived the need for a physical copy of a green card for British registered vehicles in the EU.

== Proposed technical solutions ==
No technology solution to address these issues has been designed yet or implemented anywhere in the world, let alone in such a unique and highly sensitive context as the Northern Ireland border.

— Theresa May, 20 July 2018

In the proposed withdrawal agreement, the special arrangement for Northern Ireland would end when a solution can be found that delivers a border as imperceptible as it became from the Good Friday Agreement until Brexit. As of June 2019, such a solution remains to be identified. Partial solutions have been proposed but have not been judged adequate.

A leaked memo by Industry Minister Richard Harrington, obtained by Sky News, said "This [technical solution] idea was considered and rejected by both the UK and the EU in summer 2018, as both parties concluded that it would not maintain an open border. That is why we ended up with the current backstop. There is currently no border in the world, outside a customs union, that has eliminated border infrastructure."

On 8 May 2019, the UK Conservative Party established a panel of experts to advise its Alternative Arrangement Commission on possible technical solutions to the dilemma. The panel included proponents of the two ideas below. The only participant with an Irish connection is Graham Gudgin, a former adviser to Brexit supporter Lord Trimble.

In late September 2019, during the battle in the courts over prorogation of Parliament, Jean-Claude Juncker remarked that in a no-deal Brexit, a British animal entering the Northern Ireland territory could in theory then transit the Republic of Ireland and from thence enter the continental EU, if there were no border controls. "This will not happen," he said, "we have to preserve the health and the safety of our citizens".

=== Smart Border 2.0 ===
Lars Karlsson, former director of the World Customs Organization and deputy director general of Swedish Customs, proposed how such a 'Smart Border 2.0' might operate.

== Ireland/Northern Ireland protocol ==
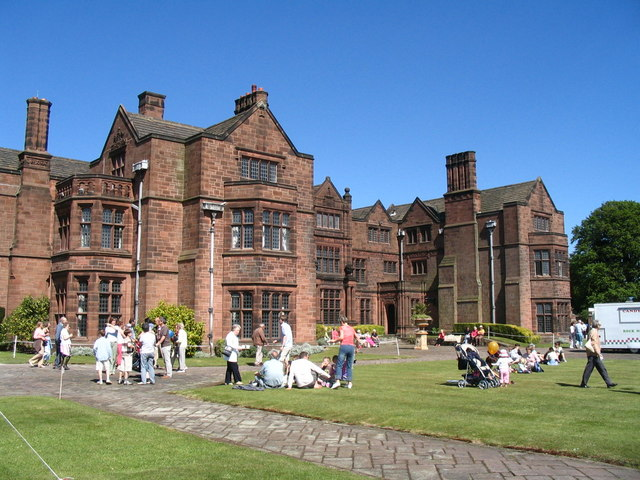
Thornton Manor near Liverpool, where talks between Boris Johnson and Leo Varadkar took place on 10 October 2019

After becoming Prime Minister on 24 July 2019, Boris Johnson sought to remove the backstop; this was refused by the EU, who wanted a legally operational solution. After Johnson's chief negotiator David Frost met EU officials on 28 August, the two sides agreed to meet twice a week.

On 2 October, Johnson presented a potential replacement for the 2018 Irish backstop, proposing that Northern Ireland stay aligned with the EU on product standards but remain in the UK customs territory. This would necessitate product checks between Great Britain and Northern Ireland, but no customs checks for goods expected to stay within the UK. For the border between Northern Ireland and the Republic, his proposal would entail customs checks between Northern Ireland and the Republic (potentially assisted by technology implemented distantly from the border) but no product and safety standard checks within the island of Ireland. This was rejected by the EU.

On 10 October, Johnson and Taoiseach Leo Varadkar held "very positive and very promising" talks that led to a resumption in negotiations, and a week later, on 17 October, Johnson and Jean-Claude Juncker announced that they had reached agreement (subject to ratification) on a new Withdrawal Agreement which replaced the backstop with a new protocol on Northern Ireland/Republic of Ireland.

The key differences with the backstop are:

- A unilateral exit mechanism by which Northern Ireland can leave the protocol: the Northern Ireland Assembly will vote every four years on whether to continue with these arrangements, for which a simple majority is required. If the Assembly is suspended at the time, arrangements will be made so that the MLAs can vote. If the Assembly expresses cross-community support in one of these periodic votes, then the protocol will apply for the next eight years instead of the usual four. If the Assembly votes against continuing with these arrangements, then there will be a two-year period for the UK and EU to agree to new arrangements, with recommendations made by a joint UK-EU committee. Rather than being a fallback position like the backstop was intended as, this new protocol will be the initial position of Northern Ireland for the first four years after the transition period ends in December 2020.
- Northern Ireland remains legally in the UK Customs Territory and part of any future UK trade deals. This results in a de jure customs border on the island of Ireland, between Northern Ireland and the Republic of Ireland.
- Great Britain is no longer in a customs union with the European Union. Northern Ireland is also no longer legally in the EU Customs Union, but remains an entry point into it, creating the Irish Sea border, a de facto customs border down the Irish Sea.
- Level Playing Field provisions applying to Great Britain have been moved to the non-binding Political Declaration, although they are still present for Northern Ireland within the protocol.
- EU tariffs (which ones are dependent on a UK-EU FTA), collected by the UK on behalf of the EU, would be levied on the goods going from Great Britain to Northern Ireland that are "at risk" of then being transported into and sold in the Republic of Ireland; if they ultimately aren't, then firms in Northern Ireland can claim rebates on goods where the UK had lower tariffs than the EU. The joint committee will decide which goods are deemed "at risk".

This new protocol has been dubbed by some as "Chequers for Northern Ireland", due to its similarity with the UK-wide Chequers future relationship plan proposed by Theresa May, which had previously been rejected by the EU and criticized by Johnson.

=== Implementation plans ===
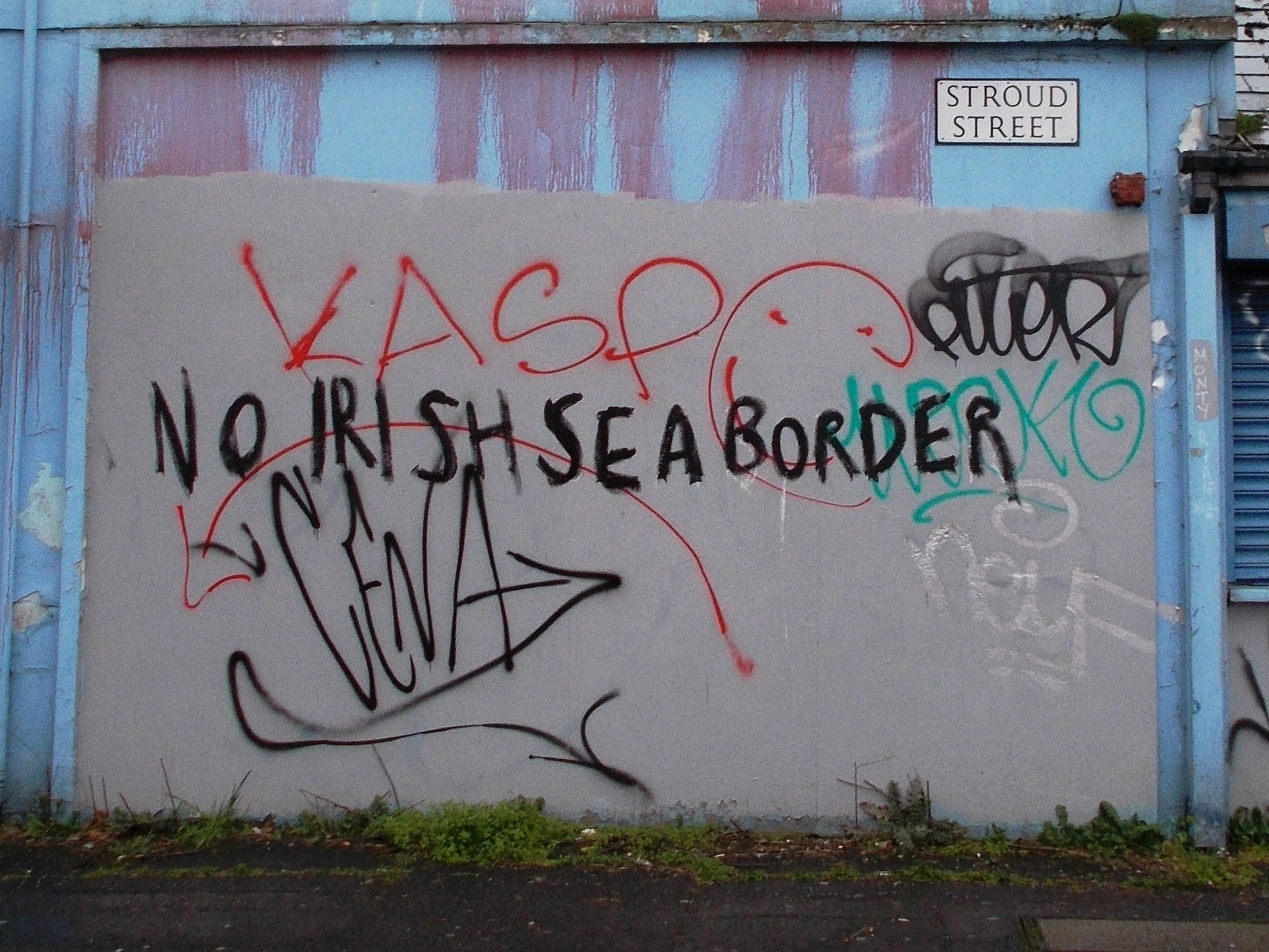
Graffiti in Belfast opposing the Irish Sea border (de facto border between Northern Ireland and Great Britain), February 2021

According to the UK's implementation plan (July 2020), a system for checks on goods crossing from Great Britain to Northern Ireland will need three types of electronic paperwork, as detailed in an eleven-page document.

On 8 December 2020, UK Cabinet Office minister Michael Gove announced that the British government would withdraw all controversial clauses from the Internal Market Bill. Gove and Vice-President of the European Commission Maroš Šefčovič announced "an agreement in principle" on all issues of the Brexit withdrawal agreement, including the protocol on Ireland and Northern Ireland, border checks, food and medicine supplies and "clarification" on state subsidy rules.

The de facto border between Northern Ireland and Great Britain bore criticism from Lord Empey, the Ulster Unionist Party’s chief negotiator during the Good Friday Agreement and former Stormont minister. He described the border on the Irish Sea as "the most significant change that has taken place since partition" and that "Northern Ireland’s centre of gravity could gradually move in a Dublin/Brussels direction. This cannot be without constitutional consequences.”

On 17 December 2020, the Joint Committee (led by Gove and Šefčovič) agreed a set of documents to give practical effect to the agreement. The documents include amendments to the original agreement (No 3/2020); determination of "goods not at risk" of entering the EU (includes temporary easements) (No 4/2020); maximum state support and "level playing field" (No 5/2020); practical working arrangements for EU inspectors at ports and airports (No 6/2020); and establishment of an arbitration panel for dispute resolution (No 7/2020).

=== Post-Brexit Article 16 threats ===
British Prime Minister Boris Johnson first threatened to invoke Article 16 of the Protocol in a speech to Parliament on 13 January 2021, and again on 3 February. He once more did so in a TV interview in April 2021.

The Von der Leyen Commission threatened to advise the European Council to invoke Article 16 of the Northern Ireland Protocol on 30 January 2021 over a dispute with AstraZeneca on the contractual details of COVID-19 vaccine and whether the Anglo-Swedish manufacturer was or was not providing its "best efforts" to supply the EU with its product. After frank representations from the Irish and British governments, the Commission rapidly withdrew the threat and apologised for its error of judgement.

=== Northern Ireland Protocol Bill ===
In June 2022, the UK government introduced a Northern Ireland Protocol Bill, which seeks unilaterally to change how the Northern Ireland Protocol is applied. In a strongly-worded letter, 52 of the 90 Members of the Northern Ireland Assembly advised the Prime Minister that his proposed action would be contrary to the wishes of the majority of people in Northern Ireland. The Democratic Unionist Party (25 MLAs) welcomed the Bill.

The Irish government denounced the Bill.

=== Windsor Framework ===
In February 2023, the European Commission and the Government of the United Kingdom announced agreement in principle to modifications of the protocol. This agreement, the "Windsor Framework", was adopted in March 2023 by both parties and came into effect on 1 October 2023.

== See also ==
- 2021 Northern Ireland riots
- BorderIrish – Pseudonymous satirical author
- Effect of Brexit on Gibraltar
- Irish issue in British politics – Consequences for government of the UK
  - Irish question – British debate over calls for Irish independence (1840s–1920s)
- United Ireland – Proposition to unify Ireland as a single state
