= Pizza Club =

Group of hard-Brexit-supporters in the second May ministry

The Pizza Club was a group of ministers in the second May ministry active from October 2018 to May 2019 who aimed to prevent Prime Minister Theresa May from delivering her preferred soft Brexit and force a hard Brexit, either by putting pressure on May or by triggering a leadership election. The group was composed of Andrea Leadsom, Chris Grayling, Michael Gove, Penny Mordaunt and Liam Fox. Leadsom convened the Pizza Club in October 2018. Subsequent meetings took place in Leadsom's parliamentary offices.

== Events ==
=== Formation ===
The group formed in October 2018 when Leadsom invited several other hard-Brexit supporting Cabinet ministers to join her for takeaway pizza in her office.

=== March 2019 proposed Brexit extension ===
The Pizza Club met in March to discuss and co-ordinate opposition to a long Brexit extension, with the group holding out continued hope for an exit on the 29th, May's original promised Brexit deadline.

=== May 2019 withdrawal agreement vote ===
Robert Peston reported in May 2019 that the Pizza Club pressured Theresa May to cancel a scheduled vote on the withdrawal agreement.
