= Sandy Row F.C. =

Sandy Row
- Full name: Sandy Row Football Club
- Founded: 2012
- Ground: Blanchflower Playing Fields
- League: Northern Amateur Football League

Sandy Row Football Club, simply referred to as Sandy Row, is a Northern Irish, intermediate football club playing in Division 2C of the Northern Amateur Football League. The club is based in Sandy Row, Belfast, Northern Ireland, and was formed in 2012. The club plays in the Irish Cup. Sandy Row are a part of the County Antrim FA.

Sandy Row play their home games at Blanchflower Playing Fields. They currently have 15 teams, ranging as young as Under-5s. The Sandy Row IIs play in the NAFL reserves league.

== Colours and badge ==
The Sandy Row F.C. badge is based on Stoke City's badge, showing three diagonal red stripes. The club plays in red.

== History ==
Sandy Row Football Club was established in 2012, originally a non-league and youth development side, played South Belfast Youth League and Small Sided Games Development League. Sandy Row then requested to join the NAFL.

In April 2021, the club put out a statement urging its players, coaches and fans to remain calm and not get drawn in to what is known as the 2021 Northern Ireland riots. This followed multiple protests that resulted in violence, including bricks and petrol bombs thrown, and a bus being hijacked. The Sandy Row Football Club said in their statement: "At Sandy Row FC we are firm believer's that politics should remain separate from football and sports in general."

In June 2021, St James' Swifts FC and Sandy Row FC arranged a series of friendlies in a joint-tournament to promote cross-community links following the 2021 riots.

In the 2023/24 season, the Under-13 girls won the Prestatyn Cup in Wales.

In 2023, Jamie Bryson represented Sandy Row FC in an appeal to the Irish Football Association denying the club of joining the NAFL. The Irish Football Association Appeals Committee allowed Sandy Row FC's appeal, quashing the decision by the Northern Amateur Football League (NAFL) to deny the club's application for membership. The Committee found that the NAFL failed to properly follow its own policy for admitting new clubs, and directed the league to reconsider Sandy Row FC's application.

Sandy Row FC was admitted into the NAFL in the 2023/24 season.
