= Northern Ireland Protocol =

Part of the Brexit withdrawal agreement

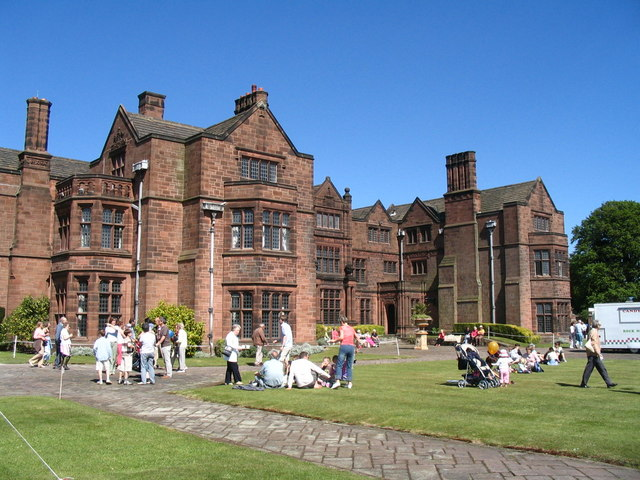
Thornton Manor in Merseyside, where secretive breakthrough talks between Boris Johnson and Leo Varadkar took place in October 2019

Map of the "Irish Sea border", the boundary between Northern Ireland and the rest of the United Kingdom (Great Britain), set out in the protocol

The Protocol on Ireland/Northern Ireland, commonly abbreviated to the Northern Ireland Protocol (NIP), is a protocol to the Brexit withdrawal agreement that sets out Northern Ireland’s post-Brexit relationship with both the EU and Great Britain. The Withdrawal Agreement, including the Protocol, came into effect on 1 January 2021. Citing the island of Ireland's "unique circumstances", the Protocol governs unique arrangements on the island between the United Kingdom and the European Union; it regulates some aspects of trade in goods between Northern Ireland and the rest of the United Kingdom.

The Protocol's arrangements, under which Northern Ireland but not the rest of the UK remains in the EU single market for goods, allow the maintenance of the open border between Northern Ireland and the Republic of Ireland. The establishment of the open border was a key aspect of the Northern Ireland Peace Process and Good Friday Agreement which ended the Northern Ireland Conflict. The Protocol instead creates a de facto customs border in the Irish Sea between Northern Ireland and Great Britain.

Principally to address concerns of Ulster Unionists about the Protocol, in 2022-23 the EU and UK agreed revised arrangements for its operation – the Windsor Framework – which took effect on 24 March 2023. The Democratic Unionist Party declined to accept the Framework as meeting their concerns until further adjustments to its operation were agreed on 31 January 2024 and the formation of a new Northern Ireland Executive began.

== Historical context ==
The British and Irish Governments: (...)
(...)
Wishing to develop still further the unique relationship between their peoples and the close co-operation between their countries as friendly neighbours and as partners in the European Union;
(...)
Reaffirming their commitment to the principles of partnership, equality and mutual respect and to the protection of civil, political, social, economic and cultural rights in their respective jurisdictions;
Have agreed as follows:

— British-Irish Agreement (appended to the Good Friday Agreement)

In 1921, the western and southern four-fifths of the island of Ireland seceded from the United Kingdom of Great Britain and Ireland as the Irish Free State (renamed in 1937 as "Ireland" (Irish: Éire) and "described" in 1948 as the Republic of Ireland). The north-eastern fifth, renamed Northern Ireland, remained part of the United Kingdom, which became the United Kingdom of Great Britain and Northern Ireland. The "province" (as Northern Ireland is often known) had suffered sectarian tensions and at times outbreaks of serious violence between Unionists, who wish to remain part of the UK and trace their origin to the Plantation of Ulster, and Nationalists, who seek a united Ireland. The most recent of these, known as 'the Troubles', occurred during the period from the late 1960s to the late 1990s. One of its features was that the Republic of Ireland–United Kingdom border was heavily fortified and militarised. In 1998, the Belfast Agreement / Good Friday Agreement brought the conflict to an end and the border was demilitarised. Since both states were members of the European Union at the time and have been operating a Common Travel Area since 1921, there was no other border infrastructure.

In the Brexit referendum of 2016, nearly 56% of Northern Irish voters opted to remain in the EU, though the overall UK-wide vote was 52% to leave. A subsequent study suggests that leave was supported by a majority of unionists (66%), while remain was supported by a majority of nationalists (88%) and by those who did not identify as unionist or nationalist (70%).

Following the Brexit referendum, the first May government decided that not only should the United Kingdom leave the European Union but also that it should leave the European Union Customs Union and the European Single Market. This meant that a customs and regulatory border would arise between the UK and the EU. Whilst the sea border between Great Britain and continental Europe was expected to present manageable challenges, the UK/EU border in Ireland was recognised as having rather more intractable issues. These were summarised in what became known as the Brexit Trilemma, because of three competing objectives: no hard border on the island; no customs border in the Irish Sea; and no British participation in the European Single Market and the European Union Customs Union. It is not possible to have all three.

== Summary of key aspects and provisions ==
The Republic of Ireland–United Kingdom border has had a special status as an international border since the Good Friday Agreement of 1998 ended 'The Troubles' (the thirty-year internecine conflict in Northern Ireland). As part of the Northern Ireland Peace Process, the border has been largely invisible, without any physical barrier or custom checks on its 270 crossing points; this arrangement was made possible by both countries' common membership of both the EU's Single Market and Customs Union and of their Common Travel Area.

On the UK's withdrawal from the European Union, the border in Ireland became the only land border between the UK and EU. EU single market and UK internal market provisions require certain customs checks and trade controls at their external borders. The Northern Ireland Protocol is intended to protect the EU single market, while avoiding imposition of a 'hard border' that might incite a recurrence of conflict and destabilise the relative peace that has held since the end of the Troubles.

Under the Protocol as originally agreed, Northern Ireland is formally outside the EU single market, but EU free movement of goods rules and EU Customs Union rules still apply; this ensures there are no customs checks or controls between Northern Ireland and the rest of the island. Goods from Northern Ireland may be moved without restriction to Great Britain but not conversely. Thus, in place of a Republic of Ireland/Northern Ireland land border, the protocol has created a de facto customs border in the Irish Sea, separating Northern Ireland from Great Britain, to the disquiet of prominent Unionists.

Under the terms of Article 18, the Northern Ireland Assembly has the power (after 31 December 2024) to decide whether to terminate or continue the protocol arrangements. "The Withdrawal Agreement doesn't state how Northern Ireland should give consent [to continue] – it is for the UK to determine how that decision is made" but the UK Government has already declared that the decision will be made by a simple majority of Assembly members. In the event that consent is not given, the arrangements would cease to apply two years thereafter. The Joint Committee would make alternative proposals to the UK and EU to avoid a hard border on the island of Ireland. If consent is given, then the question may be put again after a further four years. At the 2022 Northern Ireland Assembly election, parties favouring continuance of the protocol won 53 of the 90 seats. Nevertheless, Northern Ireland's Unionist parties objected strongly to the protocol: protesting against it, the Democratic Unionist Party obstructed its operation and, until early February 2024, prevented the Northern Ireland Assembly from assembling.

The Protocol's terms were negotiated shortly before the 2019 general election and concluded immediately after it, in December of that year. The withdrawal agreement as a whole, including the protocol, was ratified in January 2020. In February 2023, the European Commission and the Government of the United Kingdom announced agreement in principle (the "Windsor Framework") to modifications of aspects of the operation of the protocol.

== Negotiation ==
=== Irish backstop ===
No technology solution to address these issues has been designed yet or implemented anywhere in the world, let alone in such a unique and highly sensitive context as the Northern Ireland border.

— Theresa May, 20 July 2018

The Protocol replaced the Irish backstop, the rejected first attempt to resolve the trilemma. The "backstop" (also formally called the Northern Ireland Protocol) was an appendix to a draft Brexit withdrawal agreement developed by the May government and the European Commission in December 2017 and finalised in November 2018. This proposal provided for the UK as a whole to have a common customs territory with the EU until a solution was delivered that would avoid the need for evident customs controls at the UK/EU border in Ireland and also avoid any customs controls within the UK (between Northern Ireland and Great Britain). The "backstop" element was that the arrangement would have continued to apply potentially indefinitely unless the UK and the EU were jointly to agree on a different arrangement for the border in Ireland.

The backstop would have required keeping Northern Ireland in some aspects of the European Single Market.

The Irish government, Sinn Féin, the SDLP and the cross-community Alliance Party and Green Party supported the backstop proposal, whereas the DUP, UUP and TUV were opposed. By early 2019, the Westminster Parliament had voted three times against ratifying this version of Withdrawal Agreement and thus also rejected the backstop.

==== Attempted changes to the backstop concept ====
After becoming Prime Minister on 24 July 2019, Boris Johnson sought to remove the backstop; this was refused by the EU, who wanted a legally operational solution. On 2 October, Johnson presented a potential replacement for the 2018 Irish backstop, proposing that Northern Ireland stay aligned with the EU on product standards but remain in the UK customs territory. This would necessitate product checks between Great Britain and Northern Ireland, but no customs checks for goods expected to stay within the UK. For the border between Northern Ireland and the Republic, his proposal would entail customs checks between Northern Ireland and the Republic, which would be potentially assisted by unspecified technology implemented distantly from the border, but no product and safety standard checks within the island of Ireland. This was rejected by the EU.

=== Protocol principle agreed ===
On 10 October 2019, Johnson and the Irish Taoiseach (Prime Minister) Leo Varadkar held "very positive and very promising" talks that led to a resumption in negotiations, and a week later, on 17 October, Johnson and Jean-Claude Juncker announced that they had reached agreement (subject to ratification) on a new Withdrawal Agreement which replaced the backstop with a new protocol on Ireland/Northern Ireland.

In the formally negotiated Withdrawal Agreement, the 'Irish backstop' was removed, and replaced by this new protocol. The whole of the UK would leave the EU Customs Union as a single customs territory with Northern Ireland included in any future British trade agreements, but that Northern Ireland would adopt EU Single Market regulations on goods and thus remain an entry point into the EU Customs Union. Doing so would prevent a "hard border" on the island of Ireland. The Protocol includes some protections for human rights and equality measures in its Article 2 and specific EU anti-discrimination measures are listed in Annex 1.

This new protocol has been dubbed by some as "Chequers for Northern Ireland", due to its similarity with the UK-wide Chequers future relationship plan proposed by Theresa May, which had previously been rejected by the EU and denounced by Johnson.

During the 2019 election campaign, a leaked HM Treasury analysis explained some of the implications of the protocol. The undated paper said Northern Ireland would be cut off from whole swathes of the UK Internal Market, would face shortages and prices rises in shops and would effectively be severed from the UK's economic union. Asked about the report at press conference, Prime Minister Johnson said "there will be no checks on goods going from GB to NI, and from NI to GB".

=== Starting position ===
Rather than being a fallback position as the backstop was intended to be, the protocol specifies the arrangements for Northern Ireland for at least the first four years beginning January 2021. Its status thereafter is subject to continued democratic consent in Northern Ireland to the continuance of Articles 5 to 10. Article 18 specifies that it is a matter for the British government to determine how this consent is determined: it has declared that it is to be decided by a simple majority of members of the Northern Ireland Assembly.

== Provisions ==
=== Article 1: Protocol objectives ===
Article 1 of the protocol establishes that it is without prejudice to the provisions in the 1998 Good Friday Agreement (or Belfast Agreement) relating to the constitutional status of Northern Ireland and the consent principle. The 1998 Agreement specifies that Northern Ireland is part of the United Kingdom and that this position will not change without the consent of a majority in Northern Ireland voting in a referendum.

=== Article 2: Rights of individuals ===
Article 2 of the protocol provides that the UK's exit from the EU shall not cause any diminution in the rights, safeguards and equality of opportunity in the 1998 Belfast Agreement (Good Friday Agreement). The provision also protects specific EU anti-discrimination measures found in Annex 1 to the protocol. In this Article, the UK also agrees to facilitate the work of the Northern Ireland Human Rights Commission, the Equality Commission for Northern Ireland and the joint committee of the island's two human rights commissions.

=== Article 3: Common Travel Area ===
Article 3 recognises the right of the United Kingdom and Ireland to continue the Common Travel Area, their bilateral agreement on free movement of British and Irish citizens between their jurisdictions.

=== Articles 4 and 5: Customs territory, customs controls and movement of goods ===
Article 4 affirms that Northern Ireland is and remains part of the customs territory of the United Kingdom. Northern Ireland is thus part of any future UK trade deals and nothing in the Protocol inhibits any agreement that allows exports from Northern Ireland on the same basis as those from Great Britain.

Article 5 deals with customs duties. No such duties apply to movement of goods (in either direction) between Northern Ireland and Great Britain unless the goods are intended (or at risk of) onward transfer to the Union. EU tariffs from third countries collected by the UK on behalf of the EU, would be levied on the goods going from Great Britain to Northern Ireland that are "at risk" of then being transported into and sold in the Republic of Ireland; if they ultimately aren't, then firms in Northern Ireland can claim rebates on goods where the UK had lower tariffs than the EU. The joint committee will decide which goods are deemed "at risk".

The effect of these articles is that there is a de jure customs border on the island of Ireland between Northern Ireland and the Republic of Ireland, but a de facto customs border – the so-called Irish Sea border – between Great Britain and Northern Ireland.

=== Article 6: Protection of the UK internal market ===
Article 6 affirms that goods from Northern Ireland shall have unfettered access to the rest of the UK internal market. "The Joint Committee shall keep the application of this paragraph under constant review and shall adopt appropriate recommendations with a view to avoiding controls at the ports and airports of Northern Ireland to the extent possible."

=== Article 7: Technical regulations, assessments, registrations, certificates, approvals and authorisations ===
Article 7 states that it is UK law that applies to goods offered for sale in Northern Ireland, except in respect of veterinary certificates or official labels for plant reproductive material.

=== Article 8: VAT and excise ===
Article 8 says that some provisions of the EU law on VAT and excise duties apply in Northern Ireland but are collected and retained by the UK.

=== Article 9: Single electricity market ===
Article 9 governs the wholesale electricity market that operates on the island of Ireland.

=== Article 10: State aid ===
Article 10 of the Protocol deals with state aid, popularly known as the level playing field provision (which is covered more generally in Article 93 of the overall Withdrawal Agreement). The provisions of various EU laws apply to the United Kingdom as a whole, including state support for the production of and trade in agricultural products in Northern Ireland, "in respect of measures which affect that trade between Northern Ireland and the Union which is subject to this Protocol".

=== Article 11: Other areas of North-South cooperation ===
Article 11 states that the "Protocol shall be implemented and applied so as to maintain the necessary conditions for continued North-South cooperation" in a variety of areas.

=== Article 12: Implementation, application, supervision and enforcement ===
Article 12 affirms that the UK is "responsible for implementing and applying the provisions of Union law made applicable by this Protocol to and in the United Kingdom in respect of Northern Ireland" and that EU representatives have the right to be present when it does so. The Article requires both sides to exchange information on a monthly basis.

This article also states that the Court of Justice of the European Union (CJEU) has jurisdiction over interpretation of applicable EU laws (those listed in Article 19).

=== Article 13: Common provisions ===
This article is primarily concerned with interpretation of terms. As the protocol provides for application of EU-law in many areas there is a role for the European Court of Justice with regards to procedures in case of non-compliance as well as the possibility and requirement for UK courts to ask for preliminary rulings on the application of EU law and related parts of the protocol.

=== Articles 14 and 15: Specialised Committee and joint consultative working group ===
These articles cover bodies established to ensure effective operation of the protocol.

=== Article 16: Safeguards ===
Article 16 states that "if the application of this Protocol leads to serious economic, societal or environmental difficulties that are liable to persist, or to diversion of trade, the Union or the United Kingdom may unilaterally take appropriate safeguard measures. Such safeguard measures shall be restricted with regard to their scope and duration to what is strictly necessary in order to remedy the situation. Priority shall be given to such measures as will least disturb the functioning of this Protocol."

=== Article 17: Protection of financial interests ===
This article states that the parties will work against fraud.

=== Article 18: Democratic consent in Northern Ireland ===
Article 18 of the Protocol defines a mechanism by which members of the Northern Ireland Assembly can declare their consent to the continued operation of the Protocol or bring to an end Articles 5–10, as determined by simple majority of those voting. The first consent vote is scheduled for December 2024. If members vote against continuing with these arrangements, then there will be a two-year period for the UK and EU to agree to new arrangements, with recommendations made by a joint UK-EU committee. If the Assembly supports the continuance of Articles 5–10 with a majority vote, the provisions will continue for a further four years before another vote is taken; if the Assembly supports their operation on a cross-community basis, the articles will continue for eight years.

=== Article 19: Annexes ===
Annexes 1 to 7 form an integral part of this Protocol. Annexes 1 to 5 list the EU laws referenced in the earlier Articles. Annex 6 and 7 give the procedures referenced in Articles 10 and 16. Among other matters, this article requires that goods placed on the market in Northern Ireland must carry CE marking; they may also carry UKCA marking and/or UKNI marking.

== Political reaction to implementation ==
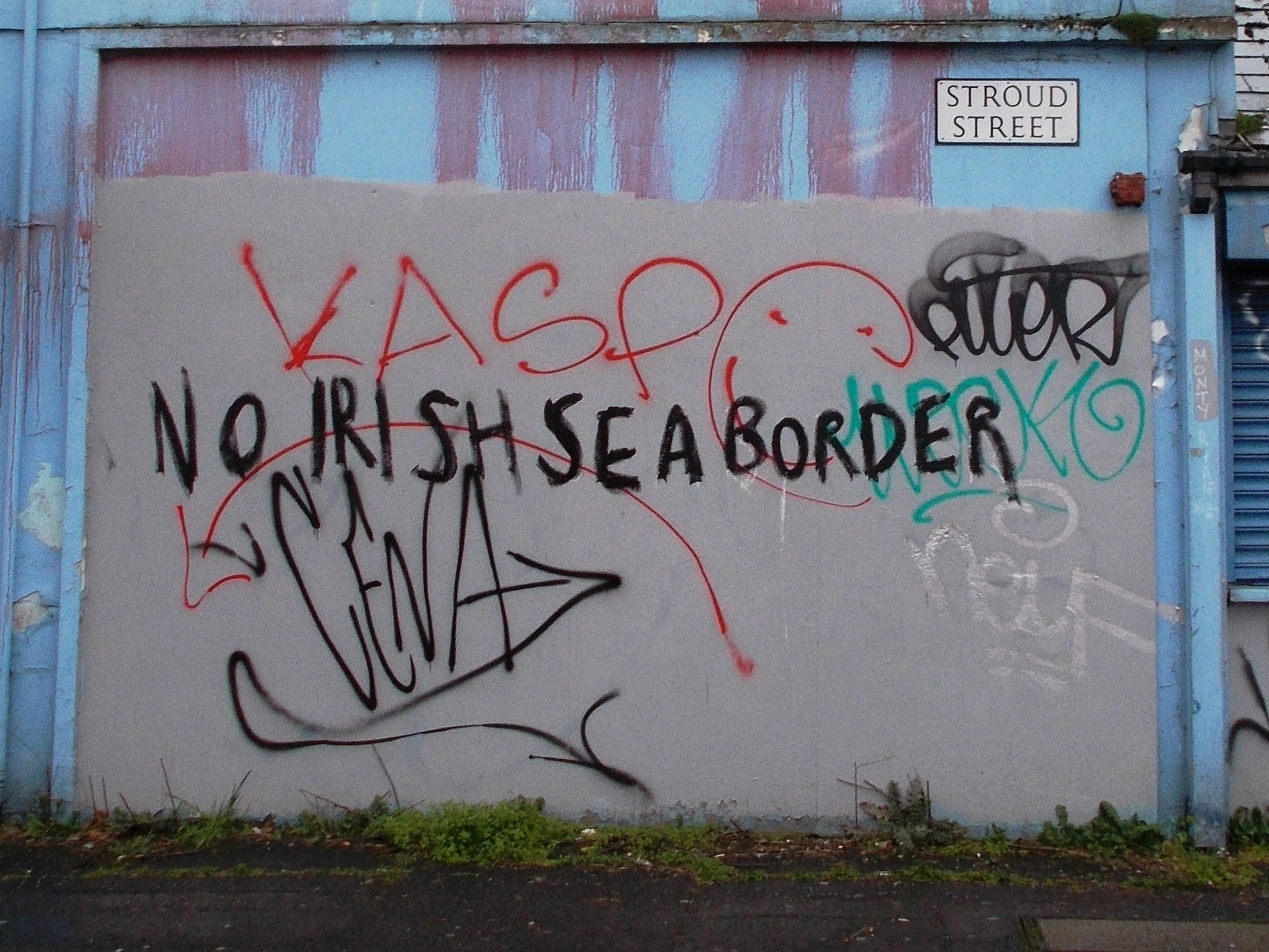
Graffiti in Belfast opposing the protocol (February 2021)

=== Unionist reaction ===
Unionist reaction to the Protocol was uniformly negative. In October 2020, the de facto border between Great Britain and Northern Ireland bore criticism from Lord Empey, the Ulster Unionist Party's chief negotiator during the Good Friday Agreement and former Stormont minister. He described a border on the Irish Sea as "the most significant change that has taken place since partition" and that "Northern Ireland's centre of gravity could gradually move in a Dublin/Brussels direction. This cannot be without constitutional consequences." In February 2021, then DUP leader Arlene Foster objected to its implicit "red line down the Irish Sea", contrary to the Prime Minister Johnson's assurances.

Anger over the protocol has contributed to rising tensions in the Unionist community which led to street violence in the loyalist Sandy Row district of Belfast on 2 April 2021. Up to 300 people were involved in disorder, 15 police officers were injured and there were 8 arrests. Eight prominent unionists who negotiated the 1998 Belfast Agreement (or Good Friday Agreement), (Note: These were Lord Trimble, Lord Kilclooney, Lord Maginnis, Lord Empey, Dermot Nesbitt, Cllr Billy Hutchinson, David Campbell and Gary McMichael, who argued that the protocol breached the guarantees of the agreement.) including David Trimble, called in May 2021 for the suspension of the Northern Ireland Protocol.

In September 2021, the four Unionist parties (DUP, PUP, TUV and UUP) released a joint declaration affirming their "opposition to the Northern Ireland Protocol, its mechanisms and structures" and reaffirmed their "unalterable position that the protocol must be rejected and replaced by arrangements which fully respect Northern Ireland's position as a constituent and integral part of the United Kingdom." However the parties declined to form an electoral pact that might maximise the number of anti-protocol MLAs to vote on continuance of the protocol as provided for in Article 18.

=== Other critics ===
In January 2021, Northern Ireland-born former Labour MP and Brexit campaigner Kate Hoey criticised the British government for erecting a trade border "down the Irish Sea" – in other words, between the islands of Ireland and Great Britain. She stated that in order to prevent a 'hard border' on the island of Ireland, customs and other controls have instead been imposed on goods travelling from Great Britain to Northern Ireland; and that Northern Ireland remains for many purposes in the EU Single Market and Customs Union, subject to a regulatory regime into which it has no input.

=== Reaction of nationalist and cross-community parties ===
In September 2020, the two main nationalist parties (Sinn Féin and the SDLP) and the two main cross-community parties (the Alliance Party and the Green Party) expressed support for the Protocol and called for its 'rigorous implementation'. Alliance Party leader and Stormont Justice Minister Naomi Long said there was a need for "pragmatic solutions" to protocol matters rather than for "people to escalate this into a constitutional crisis".

=== Notwithstanding clauses ===
In September 2020, the British government drew up legislation that would give ministers the power to define what state aid needs to be reported to the EU and what products that are at risk of being brought into Ireland from Northern Ireland, which it defended as clarifying ambiguity in the protocol. Before publication Ursula von der Leyen said that this could break international law and in answer to a question in the House of Commons the Secretary of State for Northern Ireland Brandon Lewis said that the government's planned Internal Market Bill would "break international law" in a "specific and limited way", by introducing new powers to circumvent certain treaty obligations to the EU as set out in the withdrawal agreement. The draft provision led to the resignation of a senior Government lawyer and the Advocate General for Scotland.

These clauses were criticised by Sinn Féin and Taoiseach Micheál Martin said "trust has been eroded". In October, the European Commission started an infringement procedure, and in December the EU-UK Joint Committee reached an agreement on practical aspects which allowed the UK Government to remove the controversial clauses before the bill became law.

=== Public views on the Protocol ===
An opinion poll ('Testing the Temperature') commissioned by Queen's University Belfast and carried out 24–28 March 2021, asked if the Protocol is on balance ‘a good thing’ for Northern Ireland. 44% of those questioned disagreed, 43% agreed and 9% had a neutral opinion.

In a second poll, commissioned by BBC Spotlight and carried out 5–7 April 2021, 48% of those polled wanted the Protocol to be scrapped and 46% said it should be retained.

In a poll commissioned by the Belfast Telegraph and carried out between 14 and 17 May 2021, 59% of those polled were worried about the prospect of violence related to the protocol over Summer 2021.

Queen's University repeated their March poll between 11 and 14 June 2021. 48% (+4%) of those polled thought that the Protocol was on balance bad for Northern Ireland and 43% (=) thought it was on balance good. When asked if the Protocol was an 'appropriate means for managing the effects of Brexit on Northern Ireland', the response split with 47% agreeing and 47% disagreeing.

In October 2021 Queen's University published a third edition of their Testing the Temperature report. In the third report the percentage of respondents who believe the Protocol provides an appropriate means of managing the effects of Brexit has increased to 53% (42% disagreeing), while 52% believe that on balance the Protocol is a good thing for Northern Ireland (41% disagreeing). Respondents see negative features of the Protocol with 59% believing it has impacted negatively on political stability.

A survey of 1000 participants in October 2021 by Social Market Research for the University of Liverpool found the protocol to be the fourth most significant issue for respondents with about 10% putting it as their first or second concern; 55% (v 24%) found the EU's compromise proposals acceptable (as did a majority of DUP voters).

=== Legal challenge ===
In June 2021, the High Court of Northern Ireland in Belfast ruled against an application (In re Jim Allister and others (EU Exit)) brought by several Unionist and pro-Brexit politicians to have the Protocol declared unlawful on several grounds, including that it is in conflict with the Acts of Union 1800 and thus unconstitutional. The Court ruled that the Protocol indeed runs counter to the free trade provisions of the Acts (Article VI), but the European Union (Withdrawal Agreement) Act 2020 also has constitutional effect and had implicitly repealed that aspect of the Acts of Union. The court also rejected arguments based on the Northern Ireland Act, the European Convention on Human Rights and European Union law. Likewise, the court rejected a challenge to the Regulations, which provided that the consent mechanism in the Protocol was not to be subject to the cross-community voting rules in the Assembly. In November 2021, not content with the decision of the High Court, the applicants appealed.

The appeal was rejected by the Court of Appeal, but the case reached the Supreme Court in late autumn 2022 under the lead name of the loyalist Clifford Peeples – In the matter of an Application by Clifford Peeples for a Judicial Review (Appellant) (Northern Ireland). On 8 February 2023, the Supreme Court ruled that the protocol was lawful.

=== 2022 Northern Ireland Assembly election ===
At the election to the Northern Ireland Assembly in May 2022, parties (Alliance, SDLP, Sinn Féin) that accepted the protocol as mitigating some of the adverse effects of Brexit (which Northern Ireland had voted against), won 52 of the 90 seats in the Assembly. Parties opposed to the principle of a distinct arrangement for Northern Ireland (the DUP, TUV and two Independent Unionists) secured 28 seats. The UUP, which secured nine seats, although opposed to the protocol as it stands, it would accept it given significant changes. Even with the UUP opposed, this suggests a 53–37 vote in favour of continuance, but this still means that neither Brexit nor the protocol has cross-community support.

=== Northern Ireland Protocol Bill ===
On 13 June 2022, the Government introduced the Northern Ireland Protocol Bill (that seeks to unilaterally override parts of the Protocol), giving the dissatisfaction of the DUP as its reason to do so. In response, 52 of the 90 Members of the Northern Ireland Assembly signed a strongly-worded letter informing the Prime Minister that the proposed Bill would be contrary to the wishes of the majority of people in Northern Ireland. The Democratic Unionist Party (25 MLAs) welcomed the Bill. However Sammy Wilson MP, a leading member of the party, said that the DUP would not participate in Northern Ireland's power-sharing executive unless and until the Bill is enacted and brought into force. (As of February 2023, the Assembly is in abeyance because the DUP has declined to permit election of a Speaker of the Assembly, citing the Protocol as its reason for this decision. Neither the Assembly nor the Executive may operate without cross-community support.)

On 27 February 2023, following conclusion of negotiations on the Windsor Framework, the UK government announced its intent to halt Parliamentary progress on the Bill and allow it to lapse at the end of the current session.

== Implementation ==
=== Plans before Brexit ===
According to the UK's implementation plan (July 2020), a system for checks on goods crossing from Great Britain to Northern Ireland will need three types of electronic paperwork, as detailed in an eleven-page document.

On 17 December 2020, the Joint Committee (led by Gove and Šefčovič) agreed a set of documents to give practical effect to the agreement.

=== Border control posts ===
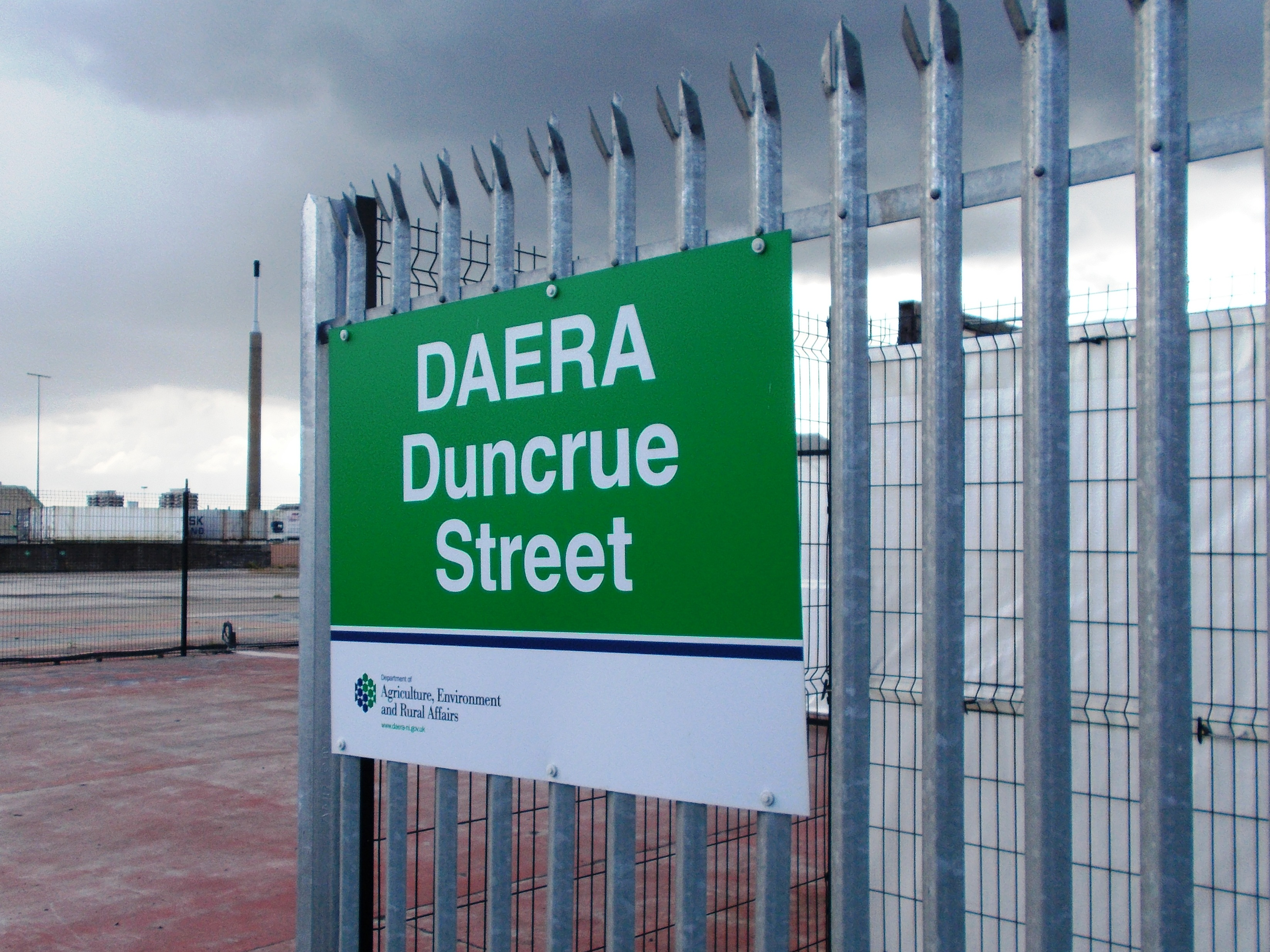
Belfast Harbour temporary border control post

To operate the terms of the protocol, the United Kingdom must provide border control posts at Northern Ireland's ports: actual provision of these facilities is the responsibility of Northern Ireland's Department of Agriculture, Environment and Rural Affairs (DAERA). Temporary buildings were put in place for 1 January 2021, but in February 2021, the responsible Northern Ireland minister, Gordon Lyons (DUP), ordered officials to stop work on new permanent facilities and to stop recruiting staff for them.

Despite an instruction by the UK Environment Secretary (George Eustice), DAERA Minister Edwin Poots (DUP) (who had taken over the portfolio from Gordon Lyons) continued to resist doing so. In April 2021, the permanent secretary of the DAERA told a Committee of the Northern Ireland Assembly on 15 April 2021 that the permanent border control posts were not expected to be built before 2023, subject to the agreement of the Northern Ireland Executive. He added that the 'business case' would not be ready before October 2021, despite the fact that contractors had already been engaged. Northern Ireland's Chief Veterinary Officer told the committee meeting that only a quarter of the checks required on goods entering the single market were being carried out at the temporary posts.

In its half yearly financial report 26 August 2021, Irish Continental Group, which operates ferries between Great Britain and the Republic of Ireland, expressed concern at the lack of implementation of checks on goods arriving into Northern Ireland from Great Britain, as required under the protocol. The company said that the continued absence of these checks (on goods destined for the Republic of Ireland) is causing a distortion in the level playing field, since goods that arrive directly into Republic of Ireland ports from Great Britain are checked on arrival.

In a report published 28 January 2022, EU inspectors declared that the system of checks on goods moving from Great Britain to Northern Ireland did not comply with EU rules and was "not fit for purpose". They said that the UK government has "failed to ensure that sufficient resources have been made available to the responsible competent authorities in Northern Ireland". In April 2022 it was reported that EU member states were concerned that "a grey zone of unregulated goods entering the EU via Northern Ireland is developing".

=== Grace period ===
The agreement provided for a delay of three months (ending 31 March 2021) to allow retailers, wholesales and logistics operations time to adjust to the new arrangements for goods movements from Great Britain to Northern Ireland.

The UK government asked through the Joint Committee structures for an extension of two years on these checks, claiming to anticipate severe difficulties with food supply in Northern Ireland. On 3 March 2021, the Secretary of State for Northern Ireland informed the UK Parliament of the Government's intention to instead unilaterally extend the grace period post-Brexit checks for a shorter six-month period. Following this announcement, the EU threatened legal action claiming the action was outside the Protocol process and was the second time the UK had sought to breach international law in relation to the Northern Ireland Protocol, an action backed by Simon Coveney, the Irish Minister for Foreign Affairs. On 9 April 2021 Bloomberg claimed that the EU is set to postpone the threatened legal action against the United Kingdom as a result of tensions in Northern Ireland. The EU announced 27 July 2021 that it was pausing its legal action against the United Kingdom to "buy time and space to consider the changes to the protocol sought by the UK".

The European Parliament, which had yet to ratify the EU–UK Trade and Cooperation Agreement, postponed making a decision pending a resolution to the proposed infringement. It was announced 28 April 2021 that the agreement had been ratified.

Northern Ireland's Agriculture Minister Edwin Poots announced 1 June 2021 a unilateral delay to the introduction of checks on pets moving from Great Britain to Northern Ireland. Checks were to be introduced on 1 July 2021 under the terms of the Protocol but are now delayed until 'at least' October.

=== Unilateral extensions of the grace period ===
Under the terms of the Protocol, chilled meat products from Great Britain such as sausages were due to be banned from entering Northern Ireland after 1 July 2021. On 17 June 2021 the British Government requested an extension of the grace period on chilled meats until 30 September. The EU agreed to the three-month extension 30 June 2021.

The UK government unilaterally announced an indefinite extension of all grace periods 6 September 2021 to allow time for further discussions. The European Commission issued a statement that it 'took note' of the UK announcement, but did not threaten any legal action.

=== The Official Controls (Northern Ireland) Regulations 2023 ===
In December 2022, the High Court declared unlawful the instructions by the then agriculture minister Edwin Poots (DUP) to stop construction of permanent border control posts in Northern Ireland. On 13 January 2023, the UK government passed secondary legislation – The Official Controls (Northern Ireland) Regulations 2023 – which empowered the UK Secretary of State for Northern Ireland to direct the construction and staffing of permanent control posts in Northern Ireland, "irrespective of whether any matter has been brought to the attention of, or discussed and agreed by, the Executive Committee of the Northern Ireland Assembly".

== Attempts to renegotiate ==
On 4 October 2021, the UK government issued a veiled threat to disavow the Northern Ireland protocol, warning that it "cannot wait for ever" for the EU to respond to its demands to rewrite the Protocol. The Brexit minister, David Frost stated that the EU must come back with "ambitious" proposals to renegotiate the protocol. On 7 October, the EU responded, urging the UK to drop the "political rhetoric", saying that they would make "far-reaching proposals" to break the impasse. The main point of contention for the UK is the European Court of Justice's (ECJ) responsibility to adjudicate on disputes that arise from interpretation of EU law (where the protocol applies them to Northern Ireland). In a speech at the British Embassy in Lisbon on 12 October, in advance of publication of the commission's latest proposals, Frost declared his view that the Protocol was "not working", was "shredding the Good Friday Agreement", and was becoming "the biggest source of mistrust between us". On the same day, the Irish Times described the sides as "at loggerheads". On 6 November 2021, The Independent reported that talks between Frost and Šefčovič had ended "in deadlock" and that the European Commission had warned of "serious consequences" for the UK should it trigger Article 16.

Talks were suspended on 18 December 2021, to resume in January 2022. The UK side had let it be known (but subsequently denied) that it was willing to defer indefinitely its desire to remove the CJEU clauses. The EU side announced that it had decided to change EU law such to waive a range of formalities on medicines and ensure "that everyone in Northern Ireland has access to the same medicines, at the same time, as in the rest of the United Kingdom". On 18 December, Lord Frost announced his resignation as the UK's Brexit minister, citing a number of libertarian concerns over the Government's domestic policies.

=== Windsor Framework ===
The "Windsor Framework" is a post-Brexit legal agreement between the European Union and the United Kingdom amending the Northern Ireland Protocol which was announced on 27 February 2023. It is designed to address the problem of the movement of goods between the European Single Market and the United Kingdom in the current Northern Ireland Protocol.

The agreement relates to goods crossing the Irish Sea from Great Britain to Northern Ireland. It introduced green and red lanes to reduce checks and paperwork on goods that are destined for Northern Ireland only, and separate them from goods at risk of moving into the EU Common Market. It also includes a number of agreements on medicine control, VAT and alcohol duty.

This agreement was reached in accordance with Articles 16 and 17 of the protocol and did not need UK parliamentary approval, however the Prime Minister said that MPs would have an opportunity to vote on it. On the EU side, the agreement had to pass with a qualified majority in the Council of the European Union. Some parts of the agreement had to obtain the consent of the European Parliament.

== Article 16 ==
Article 16 of the protocol is a safeguard clause within the Northern Ireland Protocol that allows either party to take unilateral "strictly necessary" measures if applying the protocol "leads to serious economic, societal or environmental difficulties that are liable to persist, or to diversion of trade". The other party can then take "strictly necessary" proportionate rebalancing measures. Article 16 says that priority should be given to measures and rebalancing measures that 'least disturb the functioning' of the Protocol. There is further elaboration of this article 16 in Annex 7 of the Northern Ireland Protocol. This annex says that these unilateral measures may (except for exceptional circumstances) only be applied one month or more after notifying the other party about them.

=== Imports from Great Britain ===
Northern Ireland receives a large proportion of its food and other imports from Great Britain and there have been complaints that strict application of the restrictions under the Northern Ireland Protocol either already have created artificial shortages in Northern Ireland or that they have the potential for creating greater shortages in the future.

On 13 January 2021 British Prime Minister Boris Johnson first suggested the possibility of invoking Article 16 of the Protocol when answering a question in Parliament from a DUP MP, and promised to invoke Article 16 in answer to another DUP MP on 3 February to "ensure that there is no barrier down the Irish Sea".

=== COVID-19 vaccinations from the EU ===
In January 2021, the Von der Leyen Commission was in a dispute with AstraZeneca on the contractual details of the latter's COVID-19 vaccine and whether it was providing its "best efforts" to supply the EU with its product. On 29 January, the Commission published an export transparency mechanism to gain oversight of the movement of vaccines. This included reference to the possible use of Article 16 in introducing export controls, to prevent supplies of vaccine intended for the Republic of Ireland moving to Britain via Northern Ireland. This move was criticised in Northern Ireland, the Republic of Ireland, and the UK, with Northern Ireland's first minister Arlene Foster calling it "an absolutely incredible act of hostility". The Commission reversed its proposal a few hours later. The Spanish foreign minister said the [proposed] use of Article 16 was an "accident" and "mishap" that had been resolved.

== See also ==
If we do have creativity in the UK we can solve the SPS. A Swiss deal would solve it overnight – but this is not good enough for the UK.

— Maroš Šefčovič, 13 September 2021
- Kenneth Clarke proposal for an EU/UK customs union, which would have avoided the need for any NI border. The Government defeated the proposal with DUP support
- 2021 Northern Ireland riots
- Local border traffic
- Switzerland–European Union relations:
  - "Bilateral I" enables free trade in agriculture and food,
  - Common Veterinary Area (part of Bilateral II), enables free trade in animals and animal products
