= Irish Sea border =

Trade border between Northern Ireland and Great Britain

Map of the "Irish Sea border", the boundary between Northern Ireland and the rest of the United Kingdom (Great Britain).

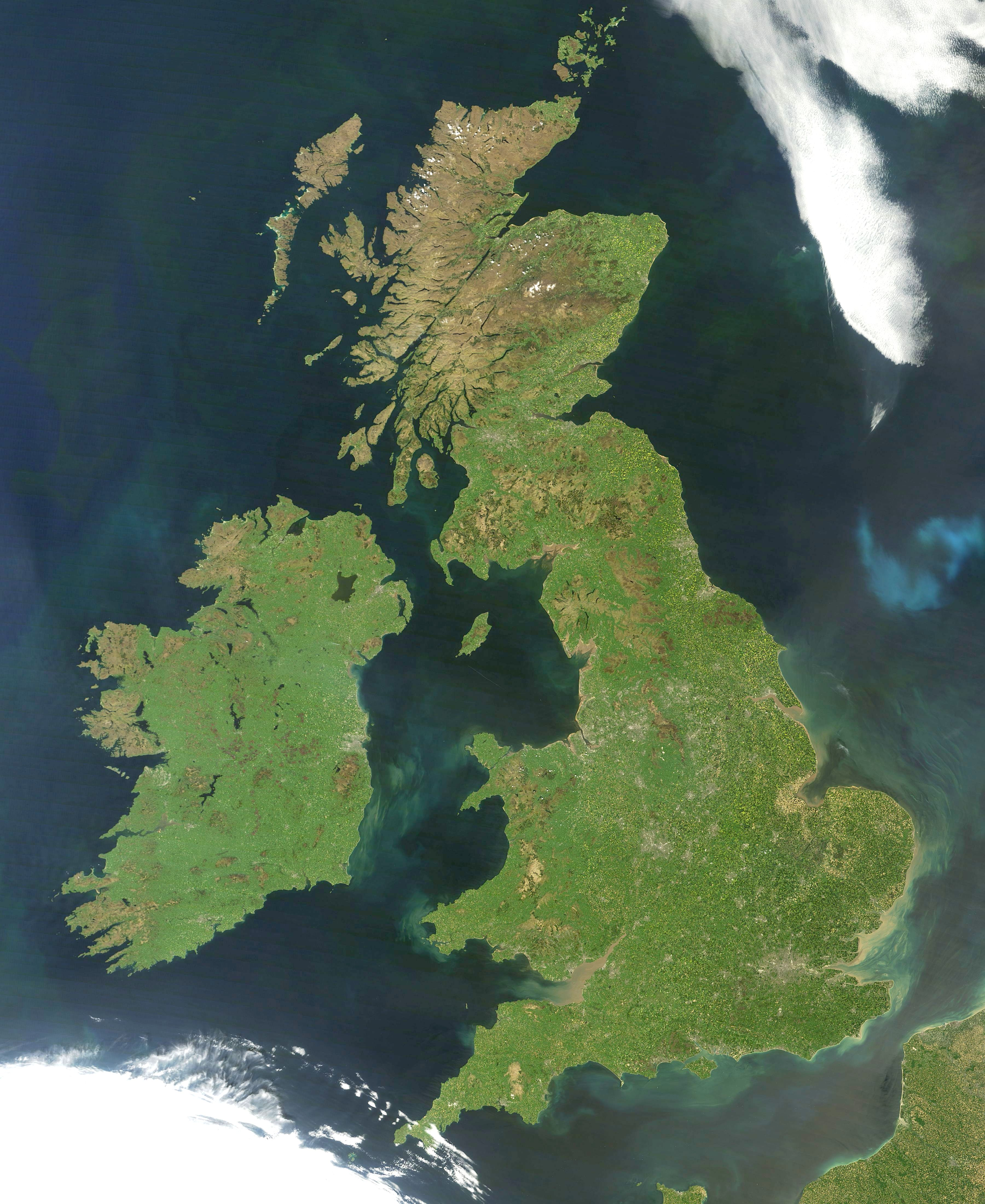
The Irish Sea separates Ireland (left) from Great Britain

The Irish Sea border is an informal term for the trade border between Northern Ireland and Great Britain. It was specified by the Ireland/Northern Ireland Protocol of the Brexit withdrawal agreement (February 2020), was refined by the Joint Committee in December 2020, and came into effect on 1 January 2021 following the end of the Brexit transition period. As a result of the Agreement, Northern Ireland remains aligned to the European Single Market in a limited way for goods, whilst remaining part of the United Kingdom customs territory and the UK internal market. Its effect is that the need for customs checks on the Irish border has been avoided, and a hard border has not been re-established.

This Irish Sea border was the option taken by Prime Minister Johnson in October 2019 to break the impasse of the "Brexit Trilemma" (of three competing objectives: no hard border on the island; no Irish Sea border; and no British participation in the European Single Market and the European Union Customs Union: it is not possible to have all three.)

Under the terms of Article 18 of the protocol, the Northern Ireland Assembly has the power (after 31 December 2024) to decide whether to terminate or continue the protocol arrangements. "The Withdrawal Agreement doesn’t state how Northern Ireland should give consent [to continue] – it is for the UK to determine how that decision is made" but the UK Government has already declared that the decision will be made by a simple majority of Assembly members. In the event that consent is not given, the arrangements would cease to apply two years thereafter. The Joint Committee would make alternative proposals to the UK and EU to avoid a hard border on the island of Ireland. If consent is given, then the question may be put again after a further four years.

At the 2022 Northern Ireland Assembly election, parties favouring continuance of the protocol won 53 of the 90 seats. On 10 December 2024, members voted by simple majority in favour of continuance, but without cross-community support.

== Implications ==
Articles 4 and 5 of the Northern Ireland Protocol specify how goods entering Northern Ireland from Great Britain are to be handled. (Article 6 affirms that goods moving from Northern Ireland to Great Britain have "unfettered access".) The detailed workings of Articles 4 and 5 were amended in early 2023 when the UK and EU agreed the Windsor Framework and put into effect from 1 October 2023. The Framework allows for goods supplied by trusted traders and clearly marked "not for EU" to be transferred with minimal controls. The same dispensation applies to parcels, even quite large ones.

When crossing from Great Britain into Northern Ireland, people carrying more than €10,000 (or equivalent) in cash are required to follow the same laws as when travelling from Great Britain to the European Union. (Note: As of January 2020, about £9,000 or $12,000.) (An initial plan to require pet passports has been suspended indefinitely while negotiations continue.)

== Controversies ==
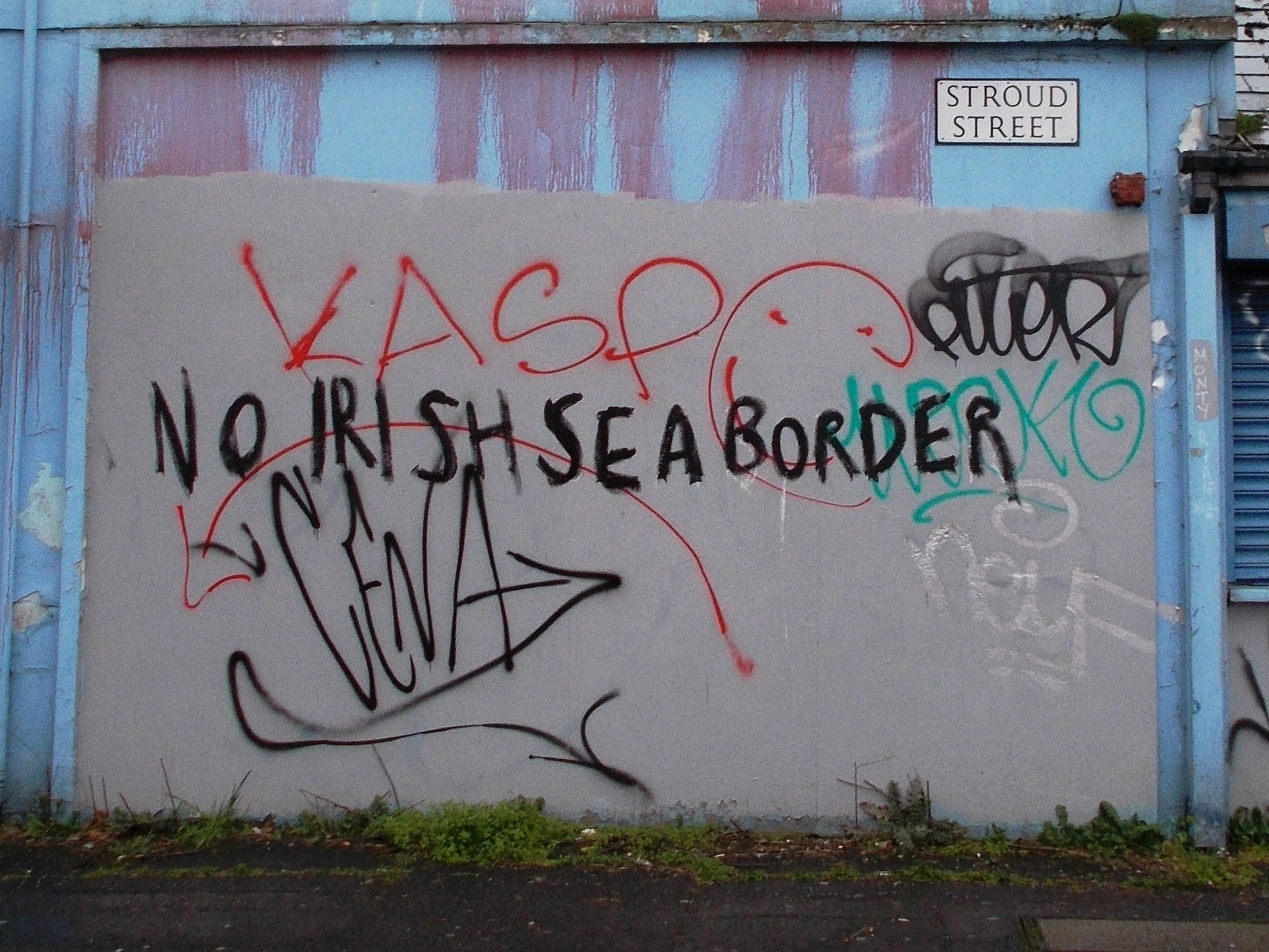
Graffiti in Belfast February 2021

While conducting Brexit negotiations during her term as British Prime Minister, Theresa May stated "no UK prime minister could ever agree" to an Irish Sea border. Similarly, in August 2020, Boris Johnson said that "There will be no border down the Irish Sea – over my dead body".

The Democratic Unionist Party (DUP) supported Brexit, but "opposed the protocol and voted against it in the House of Commons." Some Unionists, according to The Independent, believed that: "the Brexit deal has cut NI adrift from the rest of the UK, pushing Belfast further away from London, paving the way for an economic united Ireland", and loyalists called for the arrangement to be removed or, furthermore, for the collapse of the devolved administration. The governing DUP, however, said that "It would be a foolish idea to collapse devolution. It would remove the party who opposed the NI Protocol and give all power for Northern Ireland back to the UK government, who created and implemented the NI Protocol." Speaking before Westminster voted to ratify the Trade Agreement, Lord Empey (chairman of the Ulster Unionist Party) argued that the Protocol came about because the DUP had indicated acceptance of it. He said that he had "pointed out that, immediately this document was released, Arlene Foster and her DUP colleagues endorsed these proposals, describing them as 'a serious and sensible way forward'".

In January 2021, graffiti reading "all border control post staff are targets" was painted onto a wall near Larne port. On 1 February, DAERA instructed Border Control Post staff in Larne and Belfast to "temporarily suspend" physical controls on Products of Animal Origin, pending talks with the Police Service of Northern Ireland (PSNI), due to threats to the safety of staff. "Full documentary checks" continued as usual.

== 2022 Northern Ireland Assembly election and subsequent vote on continuance ==
At the election to the Northern Ireland Assembly in May 2022, parties opposed to the very principle of a distinct arrangement for Northern Ireland (the Democratic Unionist Party (DUP), Traditional Unionist Voice (TUV) and two Independent Unionists) secured just 28 of the 90 seats. The position of the Ulster Unionist Party (UUP), which secured nine seats, is more measured: although opposed to the protocol as it stands, the party would accept it given significant changes. On 10 December 2024, members voted by simple majority (48 -v- 36) in favour of continuance but, with the Unionist parties voting against, the cross-community support test was not achieved (which means that the Northern Ireland Office was required to undertake a review and that a further vote will be required in December 2028.)

== See also ==
- 2021 Northern Ireland riots
- Results of the 2016 United Kingdom European Union membership referendum § Northern Ireland
- Brexit and the Irish border
