= 2021 Northern Ireland riots =

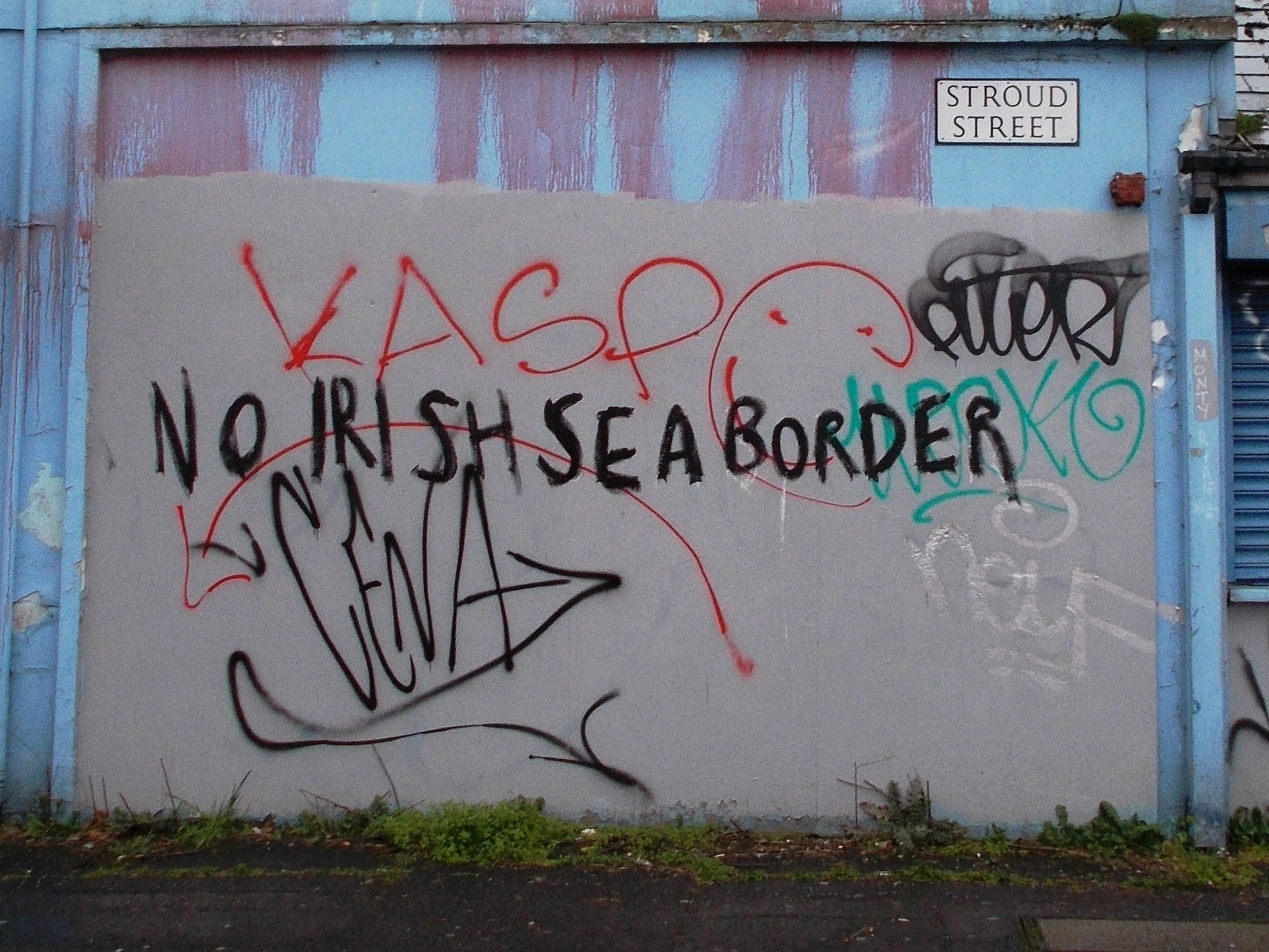
- Graffiti in Belfast opposing an "Irish Sea border" (February 2021)
- Date: 30 March – 9 April 2021 (Note: Sporadic protests have taken place after 9 April but they have largely died down in Belfast, Derry, and Carrickfergus.)
- Location: Northern Ireland, particularly Belfast, Derry, and Carrickfergus
- Caused by: Brexit, EU jurisdiction and the Northern Ireland Protocol (Irish Sea Border); Funeral of Republican Bobby Storey; COVID-19 pandemic in Northern Ireland
- Methods: Rioting; Arson; Hijackings

Parties
Ulster loyalists: Ulster Defence Association (UDA); Ulster Volunteer Force (UVF)	United Kingdom: Police Service of Northern Ireland

Lead figures
	Simon Byrne

Casualties and losses
Unknown	88 PSNI officers injured

Casualties
- Arrested: 8

A series of riots in loyalist areas of Northern Ireland began in Waterside, Derry, (Note: There is a longstanding Derry/Londonderry name dispute. This article follows the approach that Derry refers to the city and County Londonderry refers to the county (outside of organisations' names, which may follow their own approaches).) on 30 March 2021. After four nights of rioting in Derry, disturbances spread to south Belfast on 2 April, where a loyalist protest developed into a riot involving iron bars, bricks, masonry and petrol bombs. Following this, civil unrest spread to Newtownabbey on 3 April, where cars were hijacked and burnt, and petrol bombs were also used against police. Carrickfergus in southern County Antrim also saw serious civil unrest on the night of 4 April and morning of 5 April, where loyalists created roadblocks to keep police out of local estates and threw petrol bombs at police vehicles.

== Background ==
The riots occurred within a background of tension within loyalism in Northern Ireland.

=== Irish Sea border ===
Loyalists and unionists argued that post-Brexit trading arrangements have created barriers between Northern Ireland and the rest of the United Kingdom, due to interference from the European Union. The Loyalist Communities Council, which represents paramilitary groups including the Ulster Volunteer Force and the Ulster Defence Association withdrew their support for the Good Friday Agreement (which brought to an end The Troubles) until the sea border is removed. A port worker in Larne was forced to relocate with his family after receiving a death threat from an unnamed loyalist paramilitary group.

=== Bobby Storey funeral ===
Tensions had also arisen earlier in the week after authorities decided not to prosecute 24 Sinn Féin politicians after they attended the funeral of former IRA head of intelligence Bobby Storey, which drew crowds of around 2,000 people, who allegedly breached COVID-19 restrictions. The main unionist parties, including First Minister Arlene Foster, called for the resignation of Simon Byrne, the chief constable of the Police Service of Northern Ireland (PSNI), claiming he had lost the confidence of the community. Foster had tweeted "Devastating outcome for public confidence in policing. There will be consequences".

=== Social issues ===
Other factors that contributed to the violence included the PSNI seizing illicit drugs from the South East Antrim UDA on several occasions, causing particular ill feeling towards the PSNI. Youth workers said the closure of youth centres because of COVID-19 restrictions had contributed to the trouble.

== Riots ==
=== Waterside, Derry ===
The riots began in the unionist Tullyally estate. Petrol bombs and masonry were the main weapons used by rioters there and in the predominantly unionist Rossdowney Road/Lincoln Court area. Rioting took place outside a nursing home in Nelson Drive, which police said caused "untold fear and distress" to residents. A digger was set alight as were pallets. Disorder continued on 4 April when children as young as twelve were involved in attacking the PSNI with masonry, petrol bombs and fireworks with fire crews also being attacked.

Twelve PSNI officers were wounded, receiving injuries to heads, legs or feet.

On 5 April, a gang of around 20 youths were seen at the site of a burning car in Sperrin Park.

=== Newtownabbey ===
Rioting broke out in the loyalist O'Neill Road / Doagh Road area of Newtownabbey during the evening of 3 April. The PSNI said 30 petrol bombs were thrown at police, and three vehicles were hijacked and set ablaze during the rioting. Minor disturbances resumed on 4 April although to a lesser extent than the previous night.

=== Carrickfergus, County Antrim ===
On the night of 4 April, Ulster loyalists began to gather on the North Road area of Carrickfergus, setting fire to bins and laying them across the road. When police arrived, items such as bricks and petrol bombs were used in an attempt by Ulster loyalists to injure police and keep them out of Carrickfergus estates.

On 5 April, a crowd of young people gathered in the North Road area of the town and lit a fire in the middle of the road. Witnesses said petrol bombs were thrown sporadically at police.

On 7 April, occupants of houses in Cherry Walk and Glenfield Walk fled the area after windows were smashed and the home of a pensioner on Pinewood Avenue was attacked. Local sources said the targets were chosen on the basis of rumours about the occupants or people connected to them. The UVF ordered that Catholic families be removed from a housing estate – it has been called a "form of 21st century ethnic cleansing".

=== Unauthorised parades ===
On 5 April, unauthorised parades of loyalists, some wearing masks, took place in Portadown, Ballymena and Markethill. The PSNI are investigating these parades as they appear not to have been notified to the Parades Commission.

Following an unauthorised parade in Moygashel on 24 April, PSNI officers were struck with petrol bombs and masonry in loyalist disorder.

=== Belfast ===
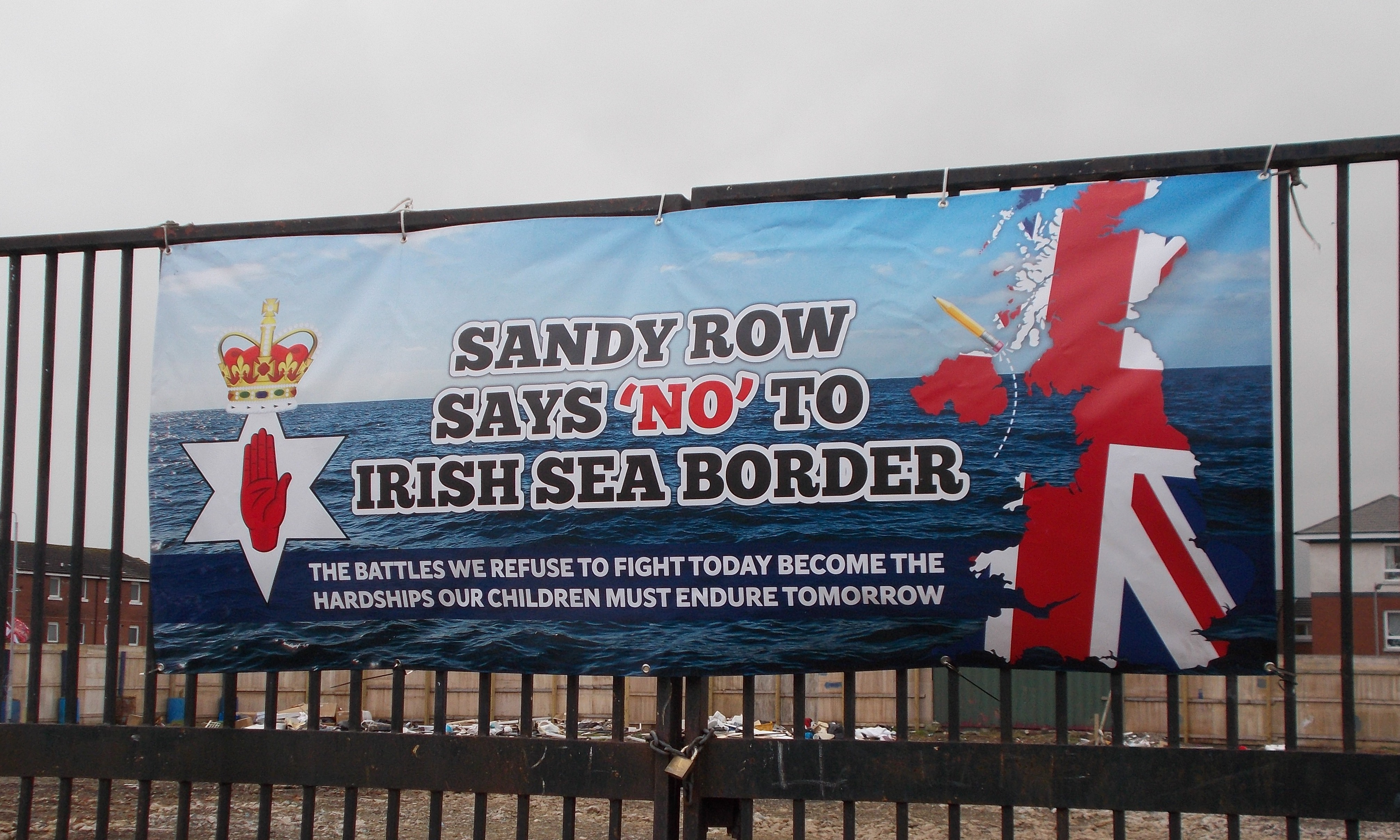
Banner displayed in Sandy Row (March 2021)

Disturbances broke out in the Sandy Row area of south Belfast on 2 April. Following a protest, a riot erupted and Ulster loyalists attacked the PSNI with bottles, bricks, petrol bombs and fireworks. Eight people were arrested, including a 13-year-old boy. The PSNI said the ages of those arrested ranged from 13 to 25. Sandy Row FC put out a statement urging its fans, players and coaches to not get involved in the rioting. The Sandy Row Football Club said in their statement: "At Sandy Row FC we are firm believer's [sic] that politics should remain separate from football and sports in general."

On 7 April, a bus was hijacked by loyalist youths and set on fire at the junction of Lanark Way and Shankill Road in Belfast. A Belfast Telegraph photographer was assaulted and his cameras damaged. Rioters on each side of the peace line threw petrol bombs across it.

On 8 April, rioters again gathered in West Belfast, throwing bricks, petrol bombs and projectiles at police on the nationalist Springfield Road area. In response, police deployed water cannons for the first time in six years. PSNI confirmed 19 officers and a police dog were injured.

On 9 April, the last date of the riots, loyalist leaders urged the community not to participate in protests as a mark of respect following the death of Prince Philip, Duke of Edinburgh, and therefore a number of planned protests were postponed. However, police were again attacked with stones and bottles in the loyalist Tiger's Bay and nationalist New Lodge areas of North Belfast and a car was set on fire. PSNI confirmed 14 officers were injured. In the majority unionist town Coleraine, masked teenagers built a road block and set it on fire. Petrol bombs were also thrown at police.

== Government response ==
=== Police ===
Chief Superintendent Darrin Jones, area commander for Derry city and Strabane area, condemned the riots and disorder as "totally unacceptable". He said in a statement:

A care home should be a place of sanctuary for some of the most vulnerable people in our society. I would speak directly to those who were rioting last night, how would you feel if your grandmother or grandfather was in this care home and subjected to this violence? This has been the fifth night of disorder in Derry/Londonderry, this is totally unacceptable. It is vital that we all send out a message to those responsible that such behaviour will not be tolerated. The people of Derry/Londonderry deserve to feel safe within their own homes and be able to walk the streets without fear. I would ask that anyone who has any influence in communities – whether parents, guardians, community or elected representatives – please, use that influence to ensure young people do not get caught up in criminality and that they are kept safe and away from harm."

On 2 April 2021, Chief Superintendent Simon Walls, district commander for Belfast, said a "small local protest quickly developed into an attack on police". The following day he said it was a "real tragedy" that children as young as 13 or 14 were among the arrested and "sitting in a custody suite this morning" and facing investigation and possible conviction. Walls urged "people with influence try to ask anyone intent on violence to please step back" and "resolve tensions or arguments" peaceably.

Chief Superintendent Davy Beck said on the afternoon of 5 April that police were ready for more violence, but urged community leaders to put a prevent a "third night of trouble in the Cloughfern and Newtownabbey/Carrickfergus area." Beck also said that he believed "a small group of disaffected criminal elements that are clearly involved in influencing young people" were responsible for the riots.

PSNI Assistant Chief Constable Jonathan Roberts described the violence on 7 April as the worst riot in Northern Ireland in years.

=== Northern Ireland officials ===
Stormont Justice Minister and Alliance Party leader Naomi Long said that the words used by political leaders "have consequences" and that the rioting "is in no-one's best interests – not the officers dealing with it and not the mostly young people risking their futures by engaging in it." Long said that leaders must "behave responsibly and dial down the inflammatory rhetoric over recent days."

First Minister Arlene Foster criticised the rioters, urging young people "not to get drawn into disorder" and said violence "will not make things better". Foster also asked "parents to play their part and be proactive in protecting their young adults."

Among Sinn Féin politicians, MP Paul Maskey said that young people were "being used by sinister elements" and held the Democratic Unionist Party (DUP) responsible for stirring up tensions; MLA Gerry Kelly (who is a member of the policing board in addition to an MLA) accused unionist leadership "in particular the DUP" of using rhetoric that incited violence. MLA John O'Dowd condemned the unauthorised parade in Portadown, saying it was "led by masked men through the streets" and intended to intimidate the local community. Ulster Unionist Party MLA Doug Beattie said "everyone bears responsibility" for the violence.

David Ramsey, a DUP councillor on the Derry City and Strabane District Council, said the riot was "so depressing" to witness and "I have worked with young people on the Waterside for many years. I have never seen anger like this".

On 8 April 2021, Education Minister Peter Weir confirmed that in areas of heightened tension, youth facilities closed during lockdown could reopen to help divert young people from becoming involved in trouble.

== Reactions ==
Following the riots, Taoiseach Micheál Martin, British Prime Minister Boris Johnson, and U.S. President Joe Biden condemned the violence, expressed concern, and urged calm.

As a result of the violence, the European Union is set to postpone legal action it had initially taken against the United Kingdom for unilaterally extending waivers on checks on goods entering Northern Ireland from Great Britain.

The South Belfast Ulster Political Research Group, connected to the UDA, was the first loyalist group to call for an end to the unrest on 8 April 2021. It said that "recent public disorder has deflected from the original issues that have caused such dismay and anger from within our community", and that politics rather than street disturbances was the way to resolve these issues. The Loyalist Communities Council issued a statement 9 April 2021 stating that none of their associated groups have been involved either directly or indirectly in the violence witnessed in recent days. They said any actions taken by the Loyalist community should be entirely peaceful and called on the government to negotiate a new protocol that ensures there is no hard border between Northern Ireland and the rest of the United Kingdom, as well as no hard border on the island of Ireland.

Translink announced precautionary diversions from 12 April following the arson attack on a bus the previous week.

== See also ==
- 1969 Northern Ireland riots
- Northern Ireland peace process
