= Windsor Framework =

2023 agreement between the EU and UK

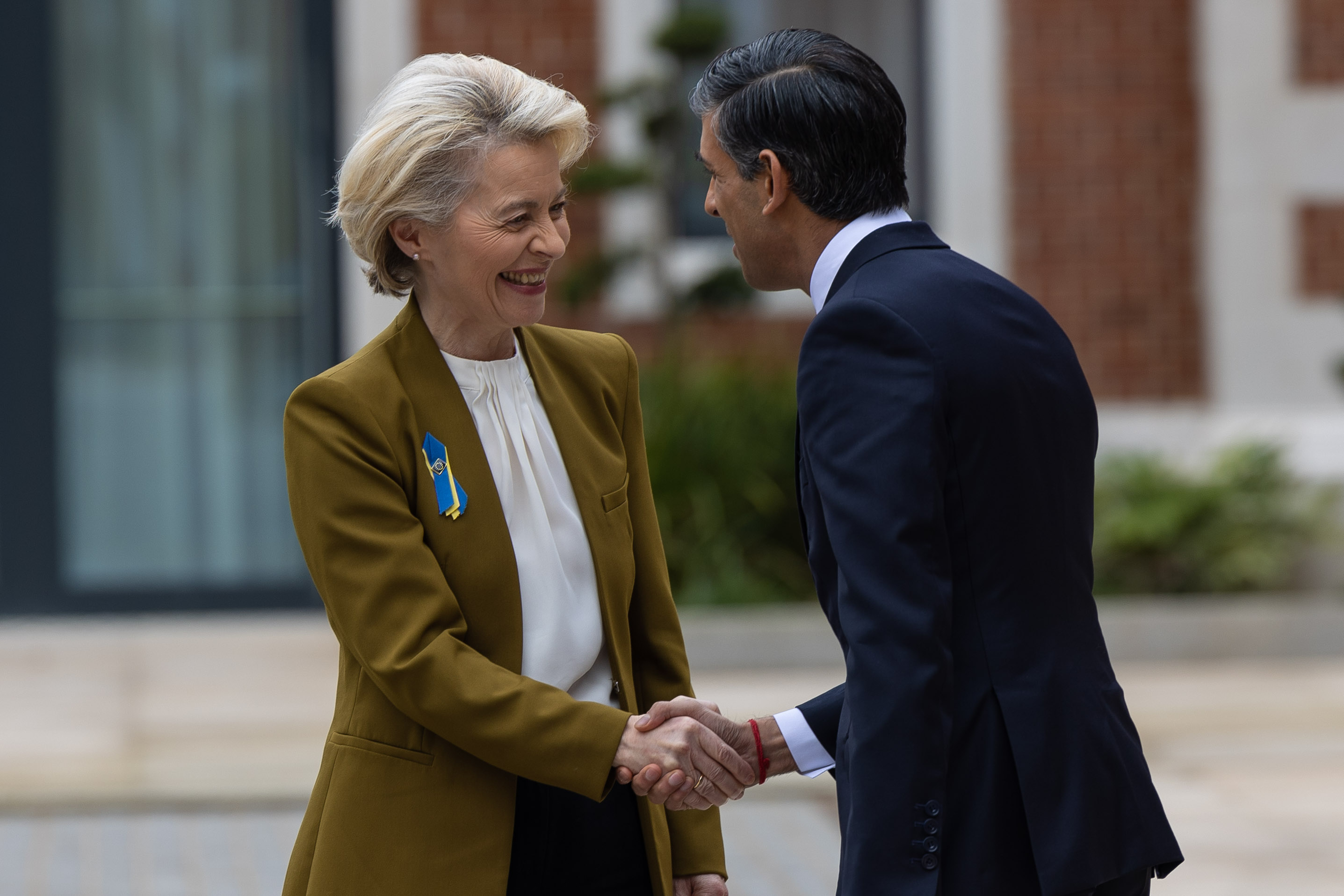
Rishi Sunak and Ursula von der Leyen in Windsor on 27 February 2023 to announce the finalised deal

The Windsor Framework is a post-Brexit legal agreement between the European Union and the United Kingdom which adjusts the operation of the Northern Ireland Protocol. The Framework was announced on 27 February 2023, formally adopted by both parties on 24 March 2023 and came into effect on 1 October 2023. The UK Government announced plans for revisions to the Framework's operation in January 2024.

The Framework was negotiated to address political concerns in the UK and especially among Ulster Unionists about the Northern Ireland Protocol. Under the terms of the Protocol, Northern Ireland, unlike the rest of the UK, remains in the EU single market for goods. This puts in place a de facto Irish Sea trade border for goods moving to Northern Ireland from Great Britain. (Note: Northern Ireland Protocol § Articles 4 and 5 govern movement of goods from Great Britain to Northern Ireland. Northern Ireland Protocol § Article 6 affirms that goods from Northern Ireland shall have unfettered access to the rest of the UK internal market. So the issue only arises for westbound traffic.) The Framework changes aspects of the Protocol's operation, particularly to ease custom checks on goods arriving from Great Britain. It gives UK government more control over VAT rates applying in Northern Ireland and states that medicines placed on the market in Northern Ireland will be regulated by the UK and not the EU. It gives the Northern Ireland administration and UK government a mechanism to object to, pause, and potentially disapply updated and amended EU laws, mainly concerning goods.

Following the Framework's announcement, Ulster Unionist politicians, while stating that the Framework was an improvement on the original implementation of the Protocol, remained concerned that the nature of Northern Ireland's participation in the UK Internal Market was diminished by the Protocol's very existence. These concerns were a key factor in the refusal of the Democratic Unionist Party (DUP), from February 2022, to allow the operation of the Northern Ireland Assembly, thus suspending devolved government in Northern Ireland. In January 2024 the UK Government and DUP reached agreement on proposed revisions to the Framework's operation, the end of the DUP boycott, and thereby the restoration of devolved government.

== Contents of the agreement ==
The agreement relates to goods crossing the Irish Sea from Great Britain to Northern Ireland. It introduces "conceptual" green and red lanes to reduce checks and paperwork on goods that are destined for Northern Ireland, and separates them from goods at risk of moving into the EU Single Market. It also includes a number of agreements on medicine control, VAT and alcohol duty.

=== "Not for EU" ===
An element of the agreement that facilitates minimal checks on (mainly) food items being shipped from Great Britain, is the use of "not for EU" labels. This label indicates that the product is not certified to conform to EU standards and thus may not legally be sold (or resold) in the EU. (Note: This does not mean that the product would not meet EU standards but only that it is not warranted to do so.) The requirement for these labels was phased in over three years. "Meat and fresh dairy products are to be labelled from October 2023, all other dairy products from October 2024, and composite products, fruit, vegetables, and fish from July 2025". The Framework only requires these labels to be used on GB goods intended for sale in Northern Ireland, but the Sunak government decided that they should also be used in Great Britain, beginning in October 2024. Following the change of UK government after the July 2024 general election, the plan for UK-wide "not for EU" labelling was scrapped.

=== Stormont brake ===
The framework introduces a mechanism called the "Stormont brake", which would allow the Northern Ireland Assembly to temporarily stop any changes to EU goods regulations from applying in Northern Ireland if the Assembly feared that the changes would have "significant and lasting effects on everyday lives".

According to the agreement, the Northern Ireland Assembly can trigger the brake on any new "significantly different" rule being implemented if 30 Members of the Legislative Assembly from two or more parties object, giving way to a 14-day consultation period before reference to the UK Government for consideration. Cross-community consent (support from both unionists and nationalists) is not required. However, "the government says a decision on whether to permanently block an EU rule, once suspended and following discussion in the Joint Committee, would not happen 'in the absence of a cross-community vote'".

As part of the Stormont brake, the Windsor Framework Democratic Scrutiny Committee was established.

== Agreement and signing of the Framework ==
The agreement was named after the meeting of the UK Prime Minister, Rishi Sunak, and the President of the European Commission, Ursula von der Leyen, at the Fairmont Hotel at Windsor Great Park. After meeting the Prime Minister and announcing the deal at the Windsor Guildhall, von der Leyen then had tea with King Charles III in Windsor Castle.

The agreement was reached in accordance with Article 14 and Article 15 of the protocol and did not formally need parliamentary approval. However, the Prime Minister promised that MPs should have an opportunity to vote on it: the vote took place in the House of Commons on 22 March 2023 and the Framework was passed with a large majority. The adoption halted both the Northern Ireland Protocol Bill which the UK government had been taking forward, and the infringement procedures by the European Commission brought against the UK in relation to the bill.

On the EU side, there was no single vote or decision on the Framework as a whole. Some of the changed arrangements to be put in place under the Framework required agreement through qualified majority in the Council of the European Union. Some parts of the agreement required the consent of the European Parliament.

== Reactions ==
The command paper presented to the UK Parliament on 27 February 2023

=== Ireland ===
Leo Varadkar, the Taoiseach, welcomed the agreement and said: "The Irish Government will do all we can to make these new arrangements work in the interest of people and enterprises in Northern Ireland, here in the Republic of Ireland while protecting the European Single Market and the Common Travel Area between Ireland and the United Kingdom and the Good Friday Agreement." Sinn Féin president Mary Lou McDonald indicated her support for the agreement.

=== Northern Ireland ===
Vice President of Sinn Féin Michelle O'Neill said "I rarely find myself agreeing with a British prime minister but access to both markets has to be grabbed with both hands".

Democratic Unionist Party (DUP) leader Jeffrey Donaldson's initial reaction to the agreement was one in which he said progress was made in several areas with several obstacles outstanding, adding that the framework would have to hold up to the party's seven tests on a suitable replacement to the Northern Ireland Protocol. Sammy Wilson expressed scepticism toward the Stormont brake, saying that "[DUP MPs] still fear our position in the United Kingdom is not going to be restored". On 20 March 2023, Donaldson announced that the DUP would oppose the framework, with the party and other unionists arguing that the agreement would continue to require Northern Ireland to comply with EU law.

Alliance Party deputy leader Stephen Farry and Social Democratic and Labour Party leader Colum Eastwood both expressed concerns about the Stormont Brake and the need for dual access to the UK and European markets.

=== United Kingdom ===
On 2 March 2023, former prime minister Boris Johnson said it will be "very difficult" for him to vote for the Windsor Framework. Johnson said the deal was "not about the UK taking back control". Former prime minister Liz Truss fully concurred with Johnson and stated that the Windsor Framework does not "satisfactorily resolve the issues thrown up by the Northern Ireland Protocol".

On 21 March 2023, the European Research Group (ERG), a faction of Conservative MPs, denounced the framework as "practically useless" but confirmed they would not vote as a bloc against it.

On 22 March 2023, the date of the parliamentary vote, 22 Conservative MPs and six DUP MPs voted against the government legislation. The vote ultimately passed by 515 votes to 29.

=== International ===
US President Joe Biden called the framework an "essential step to ensuring that the hard-earned peace and progress of the Belfast/Good Friday Agreement is preserved and strengthened".

== See also ==
- Brexit withdrawal agreement
- Petition of concern – To require cross-community consent
