= Protocol (politics) =

Additional or amending agreement to a convention concluded between nations

Protocol originally (in Late Middle English, c. 15th century) meant the minutes or logbook taken at a meeting, upon which an agreement was based. The term now commonly refers to an agreement resulting from a meeting, or more generally to any established procedure in an organisation or group, such as a laboratory protocol in scientific research, or a data transfer protocol in computing, or etiquette in diplomacy.

In international law, a treaty that supplements or adds to a pre-existing treaty is often called a "protocol". For example, the Kyoto Protocol was supplemental to the United Nations Framework Convention on Climate Change; Protocol I, Protocol II, and Protocol III supplement the 1949 Geneva Conventions; and the Convention on the Elimination of All Forms of Discrimination against Women is supplemented by an Optional Protocol.

The most notorious example of a forged logbook is "The Protocols of the Elders of Zion".
