= 2027 in Northern Ireland =

- Centuries: 20th; 21st
- Decades: 2000s; 2010s; 2020s
- See also: 2027 in the United Kingdom; 2027 in Ireland; Other events of 2027; List of years in Northern Ireland

Events from the year 2027 in Northern Ireland.

== Incumbents ==
- First Minister of Northern Ireland: Michelle O'Neill
- Deputy First Minister of Northern Ireland: Emma Little-Pengelly
- Secretary of State for Northern Ireland: Hilary Benn

== Events ==
- Before 9 May: Next Northern Ireland Assembly election.
- End of 2027 – The cross-border Narrow Water Bridge, connecting Omeath, County Louth, with Narrow Water near Warrenpoint, County Down is expected to be completed.

== Sports ==
- 7 August 2026 – April 2027: 2026–27 NCL Premier.
- 8 August 2026 – 24 April 2027: 2026–27 NIFL Championship.

== Holidays ==
- 1 January – New Year's Day
- 17 March – Saint Patrick's Day
- 26 March – Good Friday
- 28 March – Easter Sunday
- 29 March – Easter Monday
- 3 May – Early May bank holiday
- 31 May – Spring May Bank Holiday
- 12 July – Orangemen's Day
- 30 August – Summer Bank Holiday
- 25 December – Christmas Day
- 26 December – Saint Stephen's Day

== See also ==
- 2027 in England
- 2027 in Scotland
- 2027 in Wales
