= 2026 in Northern Ireland =

- Centuries: 20th; 21st
- Decades: 2000s; 2010s; 2020s
- See also: 2026 in the United Kingdom; 2026 in Ireland; Other events of 2026; List of years in Northern Ireland

Events from the year 2026 in Northern Ireland.

== Incumbents ==
- First Minister of Northern Ireland: Michelle O'Neill
- Deputy First Minister of Northern Ireland: Emma Little-Pengelly
- Secretary of State for Northern Ireland: Hilary Benn

== Events ==
=== January ===
- 1 January – Provisional figures released by the Police Service of Northern Ireland indicate that 57 people were killed on Northern Ireland's roads during 2025.
- 2 January –
  - Two yellow weather warnings for snow and ice are issued for Northern Ireland, one for 2 January, and a second effective from 3 to 5 January.
  - Mike Nesbitt announces he is stepping down as leader of the Ulster Unionist Party.
- 3 January –
  - An easyJet flight from Belfast to Egypt is cancelled due to a "group of customers behaving disruptively onboard".
  - Winter snow: Belfast Zoo is closed for the weekend, while some sports fixtures are affected by the adverse weather.
- 4 January –
  - With a yellow weather warning for snow set to remain in place until midday on Monday 5 January, a number of schools that are due to return following the Christmas holiday announce they will remain closed for the day.
  - A memorial service to mark the 50th anniversary of the Kingsmill massacre takes place in the village of Bessbrook.
- 5 January – More that 150 schools announce closures for Tuesday 6 January following fresh warning for ice.
- 6 January –
  - Minister for Finance John O'Dowd publishes a draft multi-year budget covering 2026 to 2026–30 which, if approved by the Executive, would allow departments to plan longer term finances.
  - Teachers in Northern Ireland are offered a 4% pay rise for 2025–26, backdated to 1 September 2025.
- 7 January – Two people are taken to hospital following a suspected gas explosion at a house in east Belfast.
- 8 January –
  - Jon Burrows, the MLA for North Antrim, enters the Ulster Unionist Party leadership race.
  - A memorial garden is unveiled in east Belfast in tribute to former Progressive Unionist Party leader David Ervine on the 19th anniversary of his death.
- 9 January –
  - A major fire breaks out at an industrial estate in Bangor, County Down.
  - A spokesman for the CCEA examination board says that unlike England, where school students taking GCSE exams will be able to receive their results online for the first time in 2026, there are no plans for this to happen in Northern Ireland.
  - The Met Office issues a new yellow weather alert for snow in force from 5pm on Friday 9 January until 11am on Saturday 10 January. The Northern Ireland Fire Service subsequently says that it believes the fire was accidental.
- 10 January – With the recent cold snap at an end, a yellow warning for rain comes into effect, lasting from 9pm on Saturday 10 January until 9pm on Sunday 11 January. The alert is subsequently cancelled on the morning of 11 January.
- 12 January – Grok deepfake images controversy: Social Democratic and Labour Party MLA Cara Hunter, who was the victim of a deepfake video, quits social media platform X due to what she describes as a "complete negligence in protecting women and children online".
- 13 January – Unions representing teachers in Northern Ireland accept a pay rise worth 4% for 2025–26.
- 15 January –
  - Laurelhill Community College in Lisburn, County Antrim, suspends 19 male pupils for a day for "disruptive and disrespectful behaviour".
  - Jon Burrows is the only candidate for the Ulster Unionist Party leadership election after deputy leader Robbie Butler announces he will not seek election to the post.
- 20 January – Following a trial at Derry Crown Court, John Garrett O'Sullivan, who stored his father's body in a refrigerator following his death in July 2024, is sentenced to three years in prison for the unlawfully preventing the burial of a body, with half of the sentence to be served in custody and half on licence.
- 21 January – MPs at Westminster vote to remove from the Troubles Legacy Act that a measure providing conditional immunity from prosecutions for Troubles-era crimes.
- 22 January – A £50m investment is announced for the Ulster Folk Museum.
- 23 January –
  - Belfast City Council's strategic and resources committee votes to suspend its use of X over concerns about the Grok AI tool, with the proposal to be put to the full council on 2 February.
  - Following a trial at Belfast Crown Court, former teacher William Lloyd-Lavery is found guilty of indecently assaulting five girls at a South Belfast school during the 1970s.
- 24 January –
  - Three people are taken to hospital after getting into difficulty in the water at Helen's Bay beach.
  - A Sinn Féin billboard near Newry that bears a pro-Palestine slogan is under investigation by council planners after being erected without permission.
- 25 January – A woman in her 60s dies in hospital after getting into difficulty in water at Helen's Bay beach the previous day.
- 26 January – It is announced that Northern Ireland will become the first part of the UK to introduce graduated driving licences in an attempt to reduce the number of fatal road crashes involving young people.
- 27 January – Thousands of people are left without power, and 350 schools are closed for the day, following disruption caused by Storm Chandra.
- 29 January – The Public Health Agency announces that Knockavoe Special School in Strabane, County Tyrone, will close for three days following an outbreak of scabies.
- 30 January – Heavy rain causes widespread disruption across Northern Ireland.
- 31 January – 2026 Ulster Unionist Party leadership election: Jon Burrows officially becomes leader of the Ulster Unionist Party.

=== February ===
- 1 February –
  - The Met Office issues a yellow weather warning for ice overnight for 1–2 February with temperatures forecast to fall to near freezing.
  - Speaking to Sky's Sunday Morning with Trevor Phillips, First Minister of Northern Ireland Michelle O'Neill says there should be a referendum for the people of Northern Ireland to decide whether they want to be part of a United Ireland by 2030.
  - The US–Ireland Alliance announces that the George J Mitchell Scholarship program will no longer bear the name of Senator George Mitchell, who was chaired the process that brought about the Good Friday Agreement, following revelations about his links to paedophile Jeffrey Epstein.
- 2 February – Queen's University Belfast announces it will sever ties with Senator George Mitchell over his links to Jeffrey Epstein.
- 3 February –
  - Police Service of Northern Ireland officers and staff are offered £7,500 compensation for the 2023 data breach.
  - Education minister Paul Givan says that Christianity will "remain central" to religious education in schools in Northern Ireland.
- 4 February – The Police Service of Northern Ireland confirms that some officers whose names were published during a data breach in 2023 have now had their names published on Northern Ireland court websites.
- 6 February – It is announced that Boucher Road Playing Fields in Belfast, which has hosted gigs by artists and groups such as Bruce Springsteen and Snow Patrol, is to return to use as sports fields and the community, it is announced.
- 10 February – A review of Northern Ireland's gender identity services indicates that Northern Ireland is to be part of a clinical trial to assess the risks and benefits of puberty-blocking drugs in children who question their gender.
- 13 February –
  - Pádraig Delargy, the Sinn Féin MLA for Foyle, confirms he will not be seeking re-election at the next Stormont Assembly election.
  - Belfast City Council has decides to install sports pitches at Boucher Road Playing Fields.
- 14 February – The Met Office issues weather warning for snow and ice in parts of Northern Ireland.
- 17 February – Forty children are involved in a bus crash at Belleeks in County Armagh, but it is confirmed all walked away from the crash without injuries.
- 18 February –
  - Police confirm the death of the bus driver involved in the previous day's crash at Belleeks, County Armagh.
  - Dermot Parsons resigns as the Presbyterian Church of Ireland's Council for Social Witness secretary.
  - Police Service of Northern Ireland applications from members of the Catholic community have fallen to their lowest for a decade, with 27% of applicants from the Catholic community.
- 19 February –
  - MLAs at Stormont are to receive a £14,200 pay increase from April, taking their annual salaries to £67,200.
  - The Police Service of Northern Ireland says it has received more than 100 referrals to its safeguarding investigation into the Presbyterian Church of Ireland.
- 21 February – Three people are killed in a collision between three vehicles in County Armagh.
- 24 February – The Department of Education issues new legally-binding guidelines following recent changes in the law regarding the wearing of school uniforms at schools.
- 27 February –
  - SSE Airtricity announces an 8.1% cut in gas and electricity prices from 1 April.
  - A member of Lasair Dhearg vandalizes the statue of Queen Victoria in the grounds of Royal Victoria Hospital, Belfast.

=== March ===
- 6 March – Belfast Zoo says it has euthanised Thheiba and Fidda, its two remaining Barbary lions, who were 22 years old and experiencing health problems.
- 11 March – The UK government loses its appeal over a judgement throwing out a terror charge against a member of the Irish language rap trio Kneecap.
- 12 March – The pay rise for members of the Stormont Assembly is confirmed.
- 13 March – Demolition begins on the grandstand of Casement Park in Belfast ready for the site to be redeveloped into a Gaelic Athletics Association stadium.
- 16 March – The UK government confirms the Stormont Executive will receive £1.7m to help households in Northern Ireland towards the cost of heating oil.
- 19 March – The Utility Regulator warns that gas and electric prices will rise if the Iran war continues for another month or two.
- 20 March –
  - A civil case brought against Gerry Adams over three Provisional IRA bombings that occurred in London and Manchester, is withdrawn.
  - Students at Queen's University Belfast vote to reinstate signage in the English and Irish languages at their students' union, as well as to give English and Irish duel importance at the university.
- 23 March – Following a trial at Belfast Crown Court, Stephen McCullagh is found guilty of the murder of his pregnant partner, Natalie McNally, in her Lurgan home in December 2022.
- 24 March – YouTube removes content posted by Stephen McCullagh following his conviction for the murder of Natalie McNally.
- 27 March – Jim Gamble, who previously lead the Child Exploitation and Online Protection centre, is appointed to carry out an independent external review of governance and safeguarding arrangements in the Presbyterian Church in Ireland.
- 30 March – Arnold Schwarzenegger, who spent time in Belfast as a teenager, is awarded an honorary degree by Ulster University for his contributions to public services, environmental advocacy and the arts.

=== April ===
- 4 April – Storm Dave: Around 2,000 properties are left without power after Storm Dave brings high winds to Northern Ireland.
- 6 April –
  - Northern Ireland becomes the first part of the UK to offer parents two weeks paid leave if the woman experiences a miscarriage at any stage during her pregnancy.
  - Firefighters are called to a huge fire at a recycling centre in County Londonderry.
- 9 April –
  - Retailer Lidl begins construction of its first pub at a site in Dundonald, Belfast.
  - Democratic Unionist Party politician Gary Middleton announces he is stepping down from the Northern Ireland Assembly to deal with "significant" mental health challenges.
  - A consortium that includes Ballymena-based Wrightbus and Queen's University Belfast wins government funding to help develop self-driving buses.
- 11 April – Dozens of vehicles take part in a slow moving protest against rising fuel prices in Northern Ireland.
- 13 April –
  - The Electoral Office for Northern Ireland confirms that Julie Middleton has replaced her husband, Gary, as the MLA for Foyle following his resignation.
  - The Ulster Farmers' Union appeals to the Stormont Executive for help amid increasing fuel costs.
- 15 April – Ulster University announces plans to cut 450 jobs.
- 16 April – Stormont approves £19.2m of funding towards the cost of oil heating for households on top of the £17m pledged by the UK government.
- 20 April – In the House of Commons, DUP leader Gavin Robinson says that former Police Ombudsman for Northern Ireland Marie Anderson was appointed in 2019 "despite security service concerns".
- 22 April – Northern Ireland Secretary Hilary Benn announces that the UK government will bring forward a "substantial package of amendments" to its Troubles legacy legislation.
- 24 April – The Northern Ireland Local Government Standards Commissioner suspends Colin Kennedy, a Democratic Unionist Party councillor on Ards and North Down Borough Council, for three months over comments he made during 2023 in which he linked members of the LGBTQ community with Hamas.
- 25 April –
  - Paul Doherty, the deputy lord mayor of Belfast, quits the Social Democratic and Labour Party in a dispute over a council vote on a statue of IRA hunger striker Bobby Sands.
  - Firefighters are called to tackle a wildfire on the Mourne Mountains in County Down.
  - A car explodes outside the PSNI station in Dunmurry, with police suspecting the New IRA.
- 26 April – The Northern Ireland Environment Agency has set traps to determine whether Asian hornets discovered in County Down in 2025 have survived the winter, BBC News reports.
- 27 April – Around 100 firefighters from the Northern Ireland Fire and Rescue Service are continuing to tackle a wildfire in the Mourne Mountains, with the operation expected to continue for several days.
- 28 April – Former teacher William Lloyd-Lavery is sentenced to two years in prison for indecently assaulting four girls at a south Belfast school during the 1970s.
- 29 April – Northern Ireland Secretary Hilary Benn joins first and deputy first ministers Michelle O'Neill and Emma Little-Pengelly for the formal signing of an investment deal worth £72m for the Causeway Coast and Glens area.
- 30 April –
  - An inquest into the shooting of five people in west Belfast in 1972 finds that the British Army "lost control" in a number of cases and "overreacted to a perceived threat".
  - Plans for a mother and baby unit specialising in mental health in the grounds of Belfast City Hospital are given the go-ahead.

=== May ===
- 1 May – A man is charged with attempted murder following an explosion at Dunmurry Police Station on 25 April. He is subsequently remanded in custody until 18 May after appearing at Lisburn Magistrates' Court.
- 2 May – Heavy rain causes flooding in parts of Derry.
- 3 May – Abay Alemu wins the 2026 Belfast City Marathon in 2:16:23, beating his nearest rival by one second.
- 14 May – Following a trial at Belfast Crown Court, Charlie Love is convicted of attempting to murder two police officers in Strabane in 2022.
- 19 May – King Charles and Queen Camilla arrive in Belfast for their first visit of Northern Ireland in 2026.
- 20 May – Lady Eleanor Donaldson, the wife of former Democratic Unionist Party leader Sir Jeffrey Donaldson, is found to be unfit to stand trial on mental health grounds.
- 26 May – The trial of former Democratic Unionist Party leader Jeffrey Donaldson begins at Newry Crown Court, where he is accused of allegations of sexual abuse.
- 29 May –
  - Power NI and Firmus Energy announce an increase in energy prices from 1 July, with the average electricity bill rising by £5 a month and the average gas bill increasing by £2.47 per week.
  - The number of households on the waiting list for social housing in Northern Ireland passes 50,000.
- 31 May – Doug Beattie announces his resignation from the Ulster Unionist Party, of which he is a former leader, saying his position within the party is no longer "tenable", and amid the prospect that he could be deselected from his Upper Bann constituency.

=== June ===
- 3 June – Stephen McCullagh is sentenced at Belfast Crown Court to life imprisonment with a minimum term of 31 years for the murder of Natalie McNally in Lurgan, County Armagh, in December 2022.
- 5 June – Zak Hughes pleads guilty to the murder of Sarah Montgomery, a heavily-pregnant woman who was found dead at her home in Donaghadee, County Down, in June 2025.
- 8 June –
  - Hospital doctors belonging to the British Medical Association vote to take strike action over a pay dispute.
  - Christopher Paul O'Kane is found guilty of four terrorism offences linked to the 2023 PSNI data breach.
  - A 30 year old Sudanese man is arrested on suspicion of attempted murder after a knife attack on a man in Belfast.
- 9 June –
  - A man is charged with attempted murder following the previous day's knife attack in north Belfast.
  - Anti-Immigration Riots erupt across Northern Ireland, notably in Belfast and Newtownards in response to the previous day's attack, with a bus and police vehicle set on fire.
- 18 June – Barristers in Northern Ireland are to return to covering legal aide Crown Court cases after reaching an agreement in their dispute over fees.
- 21 June – A man is charged following an attempt to seriously assault a police officer at Antrim Area Hospital on the evening of 19 June.
- 22 June –
  - Former Democratic Unionist Party leader Jeffrey Donaldson is found guilty at Newry Crown Court of 18 historic child sexual offences, including one count of rape, 13 counts of indecent assault and four counts of gross indecency, against two complainants between 1985 and 2008. Judge Paul Ramsey says Donaldson will receive a lengthy prison sentence at a later date.
  - Police confirm that a six-year-old girl died after she was hit by a van in Newry the previous evening.
- 23 June – The Irish Government announces it will contribute €228m (£197m) towards improving rail services between Northern Ireland and the Republic of Ireland.
- 24 June – Following his conviction for historical child sex offences, Jeffrey Donaldson asks for his knighthood to be forfeited, and tenders his resignation from the Privy Council with immediate effect.
- 25 June – Northern Ireland records its hottest June day on record at Castlederg, with 30.8°C. The temperature equals one recorded at the same location in 1976.
- 26 June – The Democratic Unionist Party says it is commissioning an independent review into a "number of issues arising following the conviction of Jeffrey Donaldson".
- 28 June – Footballer George Best's European Cup winner's medal sells at auction for £300,000.
- 29 June – Starting at 7am, resident doctors in Northern Ireland hold a 24-hour strike over pay.
- 30 June – Stephen McCullagh lodges an appeal against his sentence for the murder of Natalie McNally.

=== July ===
- 3 July – Three men are found not guilty of the 2019 murder of journalist Lyra McKee, who was shot while observing rioting in the Creggan area of Derry in Northern Ireland. The New IRA had claimed responsibility for the killing.
- 7 July – An independent panel investigating mother and baby institutions, Magdalene Laundries and workhouses in Northern Ireland finds "systemic failures" by the state led to a series of "serious human rights issues" at the establishments.
- 9 July – During an Ulster Protestant loyalist bonfire for the Eleventh Night in Moygashel, a Mosque replica is burned. Signs saying "secure our borders" and "end the threat of radical Islam" were also placed on the pyre.
- 11 July – Police confirm that a man died following a two-vehicle crash in Markethill, County Armagh the previous day.
- 13 July – A murder inquiry is launched following the discovery of three bodies inside a house at Ballymena, County Antrim.
- 17 July –
  - Lawyers representing former DUP leader Jeffrey Donaldson lodge an appeal against his conviction for historic child abuse.
  - A 26-year-old man receives fatal injuries after a two-vehicle crash in Doagh, County Antrim.
- 20 July – It is confirmed that Hilary Benn will leave his role as Secretary of State for Northern Ireland after Andy Burnham succeeds Keir Starmer as prime minister.
- 21 July – Sir Chris Bryant is appointed as Secretary of State for Northern Ireland.
- 22 July – Sinn Féin MLA Gerry Kelly announces he will not contest the next Stormont election.
- 23 July – Jeffrey Donaldson has his knighthood removed.
- 29 July – Kate O'Connor wins Northern Ireland's first 2026 Commonwealth Games gold medal after competing in the heptathlon at Scotstoun Stadium.

=== August ===
- 2 August – A two-week trial of longer Sunday trading hours begins in Belfast.
- 8 August –
  - Translink apologises after passengers were stranded on platform at Newry railway station after a late-night train arrived after the station had been locked for the night.
  - Queen's University Belfast says it will investigate published works co-authored by Professor Jason Arday, who resigned from the University of Cambridge over a plagiarism controversy.
- 16 August –
  - The i24 news crew is attacked in Northern Ireland while filming a piece on increasing antisemitism in Europe.
  - Sinn Féin condemns the burning of images of First Minister Michelle O'Neill on a bonfire in Derry the previous day as "anti-democratic" and "sectarian".
- 17 August – Democratic Unionist Party MP Jim Shannon is charged with common assault.
- 18 August – Mike Nesbitt resigns as health minister amid a row with Ulster Unionist Party leader Jon Burrows.
- 20 August – Robbie Butler is appointed as Stormont's new health minister, replacing Mike Nesbitt.
- 25 August – The Parliamentary Commissioner on Standards launches an investigation into Democratic Unionist Party MP Gregory Campbell over potential spending breaches.
- 26 August – Anne Donaghy, a former chief executive of Mid and East Antrim Council, is convicted of two charges connected to deleting or attempting to delete an email to prevent disclosure under the Freedom of Information Act.
- 27 August – Andy Burnham makes his first visit to Northern Ireland.
- 28 August – SSE Airtricity announces a 19% increase in its prices from 1 October.

=== September ===
- 1 September – Northern Ireland's five largest teaching unions vote to take strike action if the Department of Education does not address grievances over teaching staff workloads.
- 2 September – At a hearing at Belfast Crown Court, Darren James Service pleads guilty to charges relating to a Loyalist bomb hoax targeting former Irish Foreign Affairs Minister Simon Coveney.
- 3 September –
  - Health Minister Robbie Butler announces the establishment of a new independent expert advisory committee to review how services will be delivered across hospitals in Northern Ireland.
  - Israeli triathletes are barred from a race in Northern Ireland after the organizer objected.
- 4 September – Infrastructure Minister Liz Kimmins launches an audit into the governance of NI Water.
- 8 September – David Lavery, the chief executive of the Law Society, is found "guilty of gross misconduct" after giving a character reference to a cousin convicted of serious sexual offences.
- 9 September – Share Energy announces a 12.6% increase in electricity prices from 1 October.
- 11 September – Education Minister Paul Givan announces that girls in Northern Ireland will be given the legal right to wear trousers at school from September 2027.
- 22 September – Linzi McLaren, a former Ulster Unionist Party councillor, is selected to run as a Social Democratic and Labour Party in the 2027 Stormont election.
- 24 September – The UK government declines to offer the Stormont Government anything more than the £1.5bn made by Northern Ireland Secretary Chris Bryant.
- 26 September –
  - Train services between Belfast and Portadown are briefly disrupted following a security alert at Lurgan.
  - Police appeal for witnesses after a group of youths throw missiles at a bus in Derry.
- 27 September – Prior to the Orange walk, protesters block a Catholic area in Portadown.
- 30 September – Health Minister Robbie Butler announces Northern Ireland's bowel cancer screening programme will expand from November to include people under the age of 60, with plans for it to cover everyone over 50 from 2031.

=== October ===
- 2 October –
  - Two people are killed in what emergency services describe as a workplace incident on a road in County Down.
  - The Court of Appeal overturns the murder conviction of Julie Ann McIlwaine, who stabbed her abusive husband while he slept in November 2022; the Court rules that jurors were misdirected on her loss of control defence.
- 9 October – Northern Ireland Secretary Sir Chris Bryant announces he will ban the contentious Orange Order parade at Drumcree.
- 12 October – Votes of no confidence in First Minister Michelle O'Neill and three other Sinn Féin ministers over the Drumcree dispute fail to garner enough cross-community support from unionists and nationalists in Stormont.
- 15 October –
  - Former DUP leader Jeffrey Donaldson is sentenced to 15 years in prison for child sex abuse.
  - The British Medical Association announces that hospital doctors will stage two 24-hour strikes over pay on 20 and 23 November.
- 19 October – Police are treating an emailed bomb thread received by several schools across Northern Ireland as a hoax.
- 22 October – Carla Lockhart resigns as DUP's party officer amid a difference of opinion over how to deal with the fallout of the Drumcree dispute.
- 27 October – Queen's University Belfast lifts a ban on collarettes being worn at its Remembrance Sunday service.

=== November ===
- 8 November – The Met Office issues a yellow weather warning for fog for Monday 9 November.
- 11 November – Police are treating a threatening email sent to more than 300 schools in Northern Ireland as a hoax; it is the second such incident to have occurred in a month.
- 18 November – SDLP Stormont MLA Daniel McCrossan apologises after using taxpayer-funded expenses to install a £500 coffee machine in his constituency office.
- 19 November –
  - A man is sentenced to five months in prison for damaging Belfast's Big Fish sculpture.
  - Data produced by Ofcom indicates that the police drama Blue Lights and the reality game show Celebrity Traitors were the most watched television programmes in Northern Ireland during 2025–26.

=== Scheduled ===
- 2025–26 NIFL Championship

== Holidays ==
- 1 January – New Year's Day
- 17 March – Saint Patrick's Day
- 3 April – Good Friday
- 6 April – Easter Monday
- 4 May – Early May bank holiday
- 25 May – Spring May Bank Holiday
- 12 July – Orangemen's Day
- 3 August – Summer Bank Holiday
- 31 August – Summer Bank Holiday
- 25 December – Christmas Day
- 26 December – Saint Stephen's Day

== Deaths ==
- 1 January – Paul McCullagh Jr., 25, Northern Irish boxer.
- 16 January – Mickey Brady, 75, Northern Irish politician, MLA (2007–2015) and MP (2015–2024).
- 13 March –
  - Billy Campbell, 81, footballer (Dundee, Motherwell, national team). (death reported on this date)
  - Billy McCullough, 90, footballer (Arsenal, Millwall, national team). (death reported on this date)
- 24 May – Frank McGuigan, 70, Northern Irish Gaelic footballer (Tyrone).
- 13 July –
  - John Berne, 72, Northern Irish-born Australian rugby league (South Sydney Rabbitohs, Cronulla-Sutherland Sharks) and union (national team) player, complications from dementia.
  - Sir Sam Neill, 78, Northern Irish-born New Zealand actor (Jurassic Park, The Piano, Event Horizon), pneumonia.
- 23 July – Annie Courtney, Northern Irish politician, member of the Derry City Council (1985–2005) and MLA (2000–2003).
- 26 July – Gerry Kelly, 77, Northern Irish broadcaster (Kelly).
- 3 August – Jimmy Cricket, 80, Northern Irish comedian and television host (And There's More).
- 6 September – Stephen Walker, 61, English-born Northern Irish journalist and author (BBC Northern Ireland). (death announced on this date)
- 23 September – Paul Butler, Northern Irish politician, MLA (2007–2011).
- 2 October – Ray Close, 57, Northern Irish boxer. (death announced on this date)

== See also ==
- 2026 in England
- 2026 in Scotland
- 2026 in Wales
