= 2024 in Northern Ireland =

- Centuries: 20th; 21st
- Decades: 2000s; 2010s; 2020s
- See also: 2024 in the United Kingdom; 2024 in Ireland; Other events of 2024; List of years in Northern Ireland

Events from the year 2024 in Northern Ireland.

== Incumbents ==
- First Minister of Northern Ireland:
  - Vacant (until 3 February)
  - Michelle O'Neill (since 3 February)
- deputy First Minister of Northern Ireland:
  - Vacant (until 3 February)
  - Emma Little-Pengelly (since 3 February)
- Secretary of State for Northern Ireland:
  - Chris Heaton-Harris (until 5 July)
  - Hilary Benn (since 5 July)

== Events ==
=== January ===
- 1 January – Figures released by the Police Service of Northern Ireland show there were a total of 71 deaths on Northern Ireland's roads during 2023, the highest number for eight years.
- 2 January – Provisional data released by the Met Office indicates 2023 was the second warmest year on record in the UK behind 2022, with Wales and Northern Ireland experiencing their warmest year on record during 2023.
- 8 January –
  - The High Court in Belfast dismisses a libel case brought against writer Malachi O'Doherty by Sinn Féin MLA Gerry Kelly over two radio interviews during which O'Doherty claimed Kelly had shot a prison officer during the 1983 Maze Prison escape. Kelly was tried and acquitted for the shooting in 1987, and has always denied responsibility, although the officer concerned has claimed Kelly fired the shot.
  - The junior doctors' union, the Northern Ireland Junior Doctor Committee, is to ballot its members on industrial action over pay, which is significantly lower than that for junior doctors in England, Scotland and the Republic of Ireland.
- 14 January – Gerry Murphy of the Irish Congress of Trade Unions (ICTU) tells BBC News NI's Sunday Politics that it will evaluate next steps after a one-day strike planned across several sectors on 18 January, although such action is not endorsed by major unions involved in the dispute.
- 15 January – Road gritters belonging to the GMB and Unite unions announce a week-long strike from Thursday 18 January, coinciding with a period of cold weather and snow in Northern Ireland.
- 17 January – The current session of the 7th Northern Ireland Assembly is suspended following the failure of Democratic Unionist Party to support nominations to elect Mike Nesbitt (UUP) or Patsy McGlone (SDLP) to the role of Speaker of the Northern Ireland Assembly.
- 18 January – Around 100,000 public sector workers in Northern Ireland stage a one-day strike, affecting public transport, education and healthcare services. Demonstrations also take place in Belfast, Derry, Omagh and Enniskillen in what is billed as Northern Ireland's largest strike for 50 years.
- 19 January – The High Court in London rules that former Sinn Féin president Gerry Adams can be sued in a personal capacity by victims of IRA bomb attacks in England.
- 23 January – Chris Heaton-Harris, the Secretary of State for Northern Ireland, announces the deadline to call the next Northern Ireland Assembly election will be extended until 8 February to allow the DUP to hold further talks about restarting the Northern Ireland Executive.
- 25 January – The remains of a teenage boy found at Bellaghy peatland in County Londonderry could date back to 500BC, police have said.
- 29 January
  - An urgent meeting of the DUP executive is called following the passing over the deadline to restore power sharing at Stormont. The DUP endorses a deal aimed at restoring the Northern Ireland Executive.
  - Colum Eastwood, the leader of the Social Democratic and Labour Party, says he "cannot in good conscience" attend this year's St Patrick's Day celebration at the White House because of the US response to the Gaza war.
- 31 January – 2024 Northern Ireland Executive Formation: Details of a deal between the UK government and Democratic Unionist Party aimed at restoring the Northern Ireland Executive are published. It includes reducing checks and paperwork on goods moving between Great Britain and Northern Ireland.

=== February ===
- 1 February –
  - A Statutory Instrument paving the way for the Northern Ireland Executive to be re-established is passed by the House of Commons.
  - A one-day transport strike takes place in Northern Ireland, affecting bus and train services; school support workers also stage industrial action.
- 3 February –
  - 2024 Northern Ireland Executive Formation:
    - The Northern Ireland Assembly meets to elect a new Speaker. Edwin Poots, a former leader of the DUP, is chosen to be the Assembly's 7th Speaker.
    - The Northern Ireland Executive is restored after the DUP ends its two-year boycott; Sinn Féin's Michelle O'Neill is appointed as First Minister, becoming the first nationalist politician to hold the post, while the DUP's Emma Little-Pengelly is appointed deputy.
    - SDLP MLA Matthew O'Toole is nominated as Leader of the Opposition.
    - Justin McNulty is suspended from the SDLP for leaving the Assembly sitting early to manage Laois GAA at a Gaelic football match in Wexford.
- 4 February – Prime Minister Rishi Sunak arrives in Northern Ireland to visit ministers following the restoration of the Executive.
- 5 February – Sunak visits Stormont along with Taoiseach Leo Varadkar to mark the restoration of the Executive.
- 6 February –
  - The Public Prosecution Service confirms that two former British Army soldiers who handled the IRA agent known as Stakeknife will not be prosecuted over a series of kidnappings and murders as there is insufficient evidence to support a case against them.
  - Families who use the Northern Ireland Children's Hospice urge MLAs to intervene at plans to cut the number of beds at the hospice.
- 8 February –
  - The Public Prosecution Service confirms that a former soldier, known as Soldier F, is to face prosecution for the murder of Patrick McVeigh in Belfast in 1972, as well as six counts of attempted murder. Three other former soldiers will also be prosecuted for attempted murder.
  - Health Minister Robin Swann confirms he will be the Ulster Unionist Party candidate for the Westminster constituency of South Antrim at the next general election.
- 9 February –
  - First Minister Michelle O'Neill attends a police graduation ceremony at Garnerville in East Belfast, becoming the first Sinn Féin politician to do so.
  - The Department of Health announces that funding for the Northern Ireland Children's Hospice has been reinstated, but that this will not reverse plans to reduce the number of beds.
  - A man, aged 44, is charged with the attempted murder of Detective Chief Inspector John Caldwell in February 2023.
- 12 February – First Minister Michelle O'Neill rules out introducing water charges for Northern Ireland during her time in office.
- 14 February –
  - First Minister Michelle O'Neill rules out increasing the regional rate by 15% to raise revenue.
  - Assembly member Patrick Brown is censured by the Northern Ireland Local Government Standards Commission following an investigation prompted by his criticism of the process for a senior appointment at Newry, Mourne and Down District Council, which were posted on social media.
- 15 February – DUP councillor Luke Poots is disqualified from holding public for four years by the Northern Ireland Local Government Commissioner following a conflict-of-interest over a planning application.
- 16 February – First Minister Michelle O'Neill appears as a guest on RTÉ's The Late Late Show, where she says she wants to attend events important to the unionist community because it is important for politicians to "step outside of our traditional comfort zones".
- 19 February – Junior doctors in Northern Ireland vote to take industrial action, and a 24-hour strike is announced for 6–7 March.
- 20 February – Infrastructure Minister John O'Dowd announces that construction will begin on the A4 Enniskillen Southern Bypass in the summer of 2025.
- 21 February –
  - The Unite, GMB and Siptu unions announce plans for a three-day strike on Translink bus and train services from 27 February.
  - The Public Prosecution Service announces that a former RUC officer connected with the Ulster Volunteer Force's Glenanne gang will not face prosecution for ten Troubles-era murders due to lack of evidence.
  - Following a trial at Belfast Crown Court, Daniel Sebastian Allen is sentenced to at least 29 years in prison for killing four people in a house fire in County Fermanagh in 2018. Allen had previously pleaded guilty to the manslaughter of his partner, Denise Gossett, by reason of a suicide pact, and to the murders of her son Ronan, daughter Sabrina, and Sabrina's young daughter Morgana.
- 23 February –
  - Sammy Wilson announces his resignation as DUP Chief Whip at Westminster.
  - Following a trial at Antrim Crown Court, Jennifer Lennox of Portglenone is sentenced to three concurrent 11 month terms in prison for possession of ammunition in suspicious circumstances, and for two counts of possession of articles for use in terrorism, all of which are suspended for three years. Police had found 54 balaclavas and 118 bullets at her house.
- 25 February – A planned 72-hour strike on Translink bus and train services planned for 27, 28 and 29 February is called off following negotiations, and the receipt of an improved pay offer, which union members will now be balloted on.
- 26 February – Healthcare workers and civil servants in Northern Ireland are offered a 5% pay increase by Stormont.
- 27 February – First Minister Michelle O'Neill and Deputy First Minister Emma Little-Pengelly attend a women's football match at Windsor Park between Northern Ireland and Montenegro.
- 28 February – The High Court in Belfast rules that conditional immunity from prosecutions for Troubles-era crimes, contained in the Northern Ireland Troubles (Legacy and Reconciliation) Act 2023, is in breach of the European Convention on Human Rights.
- 29 February –
  - First Minister Michelle O'Neill announces the Executive has agreed to raise the Regional rate by 4% from April.
  - A group of estate agents announce they will stop posting properties on PropertyPal, Northern Ireland's largest properties-for-sale website, after PropertyPal announced an increase in the fees for posting advertisements.

=== March ===
- 1 March – SSE plc, Northern Ireland's largest supplier of gas, announces it will cut its prices by 22.8% from April.
- 4 March – Funding for Northern Ireland's only free specialist counselling service for victims of sexual violence is extended for a year as a replacement provider had not been lined up in time for the expiry of the contract with Nexus on 31 March.
- 5 March – Andrew Muir, the Minister for Agriculture, Environment and Rural Affairs, announces that American XL bully ownership will be restricted in Northern Ireland, with owners required to obtain an exemption certificate, while the dogs will need to be muzzled and on a lead in public.
- 6 March – Junior doctors in Northern Ireland begin a 24-hour strike over pay, the first time they have staged industrial action.
- 7 March – A report into the Troubles-era British Army spy known as Stakeknife concludes that he probably cost more lives than he saved.
- 10 March – The Police Service of Northern Ireland issue a fresh appeal over the murder of John Haggan, a police constable shot dead at Dunmore Greyhound Stadium in Belfast on 10 March 1994.
- 12 March – The Unite, GMB and Siptu unions have voted to reject a 5% pay offer from Translink, together with a one-off payment of £1,500 for the 2023–24 financial year.
- 13 March –
  - Translink says it has no more money to offer a higher pay increase after public transport workers rejected an offer of 5% the previous day.
  - The Advertising Standards Agency bans a video by TikToker Danielle Walsh in which she drank four VK cocktails in under 90 seconds.
- 15 March – Trade unions representing transport workers agree to re-enter talks with Translink over their pay dispute.
- 16 March – Traditional Unionist Voice leader Jim Allister announces a formal "partnership" with Reform UK at the next general election.
- 17 March – Northern Ireland Paralympic runner Jason Smyth and professional dance partner Karen Byrne win RTÉ's Dancing with the Stars.
- 19 March – A Stormont debate on an aspect of the Windsor Framework is inconclusive, requiring the UK government to decide whether to approve or veto the piece of legislation.
- 20 March – Members of three teaching unions – NASUWT, INTO and NAHT – vote to accept a pay offer proposed by Education Minister Paul Givan that includes increasing the starting salary of a teacher from £24,000 to £30,000.
- 22 March – Health Minister Robin Swann announces a £70m financial package for social care providers and hospices to help them deal with rising costs, such as the increase in the minimum wage from April.
- 26 March – BBC Sport Northern Ireland wins Best Sport Programme at the Royal Television Society Awards for their coverage of the 2023 All-Ireland Senior Football Championship final.
- 27 March – Health Minister Robin Swann announces a £9m funding package for dental services in Northern Ireland, aimed at improving access to dentists and increasing pay for dentists.
- 29 March – Sir Jeffrey Donaldson resigns as leader of the Democratic Unionist Party after being charged with rape and other historical sexual offences. Gavin Robinson is appointed interim leader until a new leader can be elected.
- 30 March – First Minister Michelle O'Neill says she is determined the Stormont Assembly and Executive will continue to function following the resignation of Jeffrey Donaldson as DUP leader.
- 31 March – The UK government says it will work alongside the Northern Ireland Executive to maintain stability at Stormont.

=== April ===
- 3 April –
  - The Department of Health confirms it is considering whether to supply people with type 1 diabetes with an automated insulin delivery system.
  - Attorney General Dame Brenda King warns of potential offences from social media posts about former DUP leader Jeffrey Donaldson.
- 9 April – Funding of £141m is announced for improvements to the Belfast–Dublin line from the Peace Plus Initiative.
- 11 April – Mid and East Antrim Borough Council is refused permission to rename its town hall complex after the late Queen Elizabeth II.
- 12 April – An inquest into the 1976 Kingsmill massacre rules it to have been an overtly sectarian attack by the IRA.
- 14 April – Alan McGuckian is installed as the new Roman Catholic Bishop of Down and Connor in a ceremony at West Belfast's St Peter's Cathedral.
- 17 April – Further education lecturers belonging to the Universities and Colleges Union and NASUWT have voted to accept an improved pay offer that will increase the minimum salary of a lecturer to £30,000 from £24,496, as well as giving all lecturers an 8.4% pay rise plus an additional £1,000.
- 19 April – The Public Prosecution Service announces that fifteen former soldiers investigated for perjury over the Bloody Sunday massacre will not face any charges because of "insufficient" evidence.
- 21 April – Robin Swann, who is the perspective Ulster Unionist candidate for South Antrim, announces he will step down from his post as Health Minister once the general election campaign begins.
- 22 April –
  - The Court of Appeal quashes the 1976 conviction of Patrick Thompson for the murder of four British soldiers after ruling the conviction was "unsafe" because of confession evidence used against him at the original trial.
  - Legislation will clear 26 Northern Ireland postmasters convicted as a result of the Horizon IT scandal.
- 23 April – Alliance Party MLA Patrick Brown resigns his South Down seat in the Northern Ireland Assembly, citing personal reasons for doing so.
- 24 April – Jeffrey Donaldson appears at Newry Magistrates' Court to face charges of historic child abuse.
- 25 April – MLAs vote to approve Northern Ireland's budget for 2024–25, although it is apposed by the Ulster Unionists, including Health minister Robin Swann.
- 27 April – TUV leader Jim Allister, whose party agreed a formal partnership with Reform UK for the upcoming general election, distances himself from remarks in which Reform's deputy leader, Ben Habib, suggested some migrants travelling to the UK in small boats should be left to drown.
- 29 April –
  - The Public Prosecution Service announces that two soldiers who shot dead unarmed civilians Annette McGavigan, 14, and 41-year-old William McGreanery, in Derry in 1971 will not face prosecution because of insufficient evidence.
  - SDLP Councillor Lilian Seenoi-Barr is set to become Northern Ireland's first black mayor after being selected as the next first citizen of Derry City and Strabane District Council.

=== May ===
- 1 May – Launch of the Independent Commission for Reconciliation and Information Recovery (ICRIR), an organisation that will examine cases from The Troubles.
- 2 May –
  - Environment Minister Andrew Muir confirms that the sale of single use vapes in Northern Ireland will be banned by April 2025.
  - Two further 48-hour junior doctor strikes are announced from 22 to 24 May and 6–8 June after talks between junior doctors and the Department of Health break down.
- 4 May – The SDLP announces that it will change the way it makes "civil leadership" appointments following the resignation from the party of two Derry City and Strabane District Council councillors over the appointment of Lilian Seenoi-Barr as the authority's next mayor.
- 5 May – The 2024 Belfast Marathon takes place, with Kenyans Mathew Kiplimo Kembo and Beatrice Jepkemei winning the men's and women's races respectively.
- 10 May –
  - Belfast's Great Victoria Street railway station is scheduled to close permanently ahead of a move for train services to Grand Central.
  - The Rise of Race Hatred, a BBC Spotlight documentary exploring the rise in race hate attacks in Northern Ireland wins the nations and regions category at the Amnesty UK Media Awards.
- 11 May – The Met Office records Northern Ireland's warmest temperature of the year so far, with a reading of 23.8 °C at Magilligan.
- 17 May – Data released by the Police Service of Northern Ireland indicates that instances of shoplifting in Northern Ireland have increased by 20% over the previous year.
- 19 May – A 23-year-old man is charged with the murder of 34-year-old Kathryn Parton, whose body was found at her home in east Belfast on 15 May.
- 20 May – The Stormont Assembly endorses a Legislative Consent Motion to extend the Pet Abduction Bill, introduced at Westminster, to Northern Ireland, making the abduction of cats and dogs a criminal offence.
- 21 May –
  - Following an agreement between the Northern Ireland and UK governments over the way Northern Ireland's public services are funded, the Northern Ireland budget will receive an extra £24m.
  - Stormont votes in favour of adopting Westminster's Tobacco and Vapes Bill that will gradually phase in a smoking ban from 2027.
- 28 May –
  - Stormont passes the 2024 budget, its first in three years, despite opposition from the Ulster Unionist Party, and the Assembly's official opposition, the Social Democratic and Labour Party.
  - Conor Murphy announces his return as Economy Minister after temporarily standing down from the role for medical reasons.
- 29 May –
  - Pat Cullen stands down as chief executive of the Royal College of Nursing in order to seek the nomination as Sinn Féin candidate for Fermanagh and South Tyrone in the general election.
  - Gavin Robinson is ratified as leader of the Democratic Unionist Party, and announces the party will not stand a candidate in Fermanagh and South Tyrone at the general election.
- 30 May – The trial begins at Belfast Crown Court of three men accused of the murder of journalist Lyra McKee in Derry in 2019.
- May – Construction began on the cross-border Narrow Water Bridge, which will span the narrowest point of Carlingford Lough, connecting Omeath, County Louth, with Narrow Water near Warrenpoint, County Down.

=== June ===
- 3 June –
  - Lilian Seenoi-Barr is installed as Mayor of Derry City and Strabane.
  - Translink bus and train fares are increased, with bus fares increasing by between 10p and 50p and train fares increasing by 10%.
- 6 June – Junior doctors in Northern Ireland begin a 48-hour strike at 7am.
- 12 June – Dr Anne McCloskey, an independent general election candidate for Foyle, is sentenced to 14 days in prison for non-payment of a COVID-19 related fine by Derry Magistrates.
- 13 June – A teenage boy convicted of raping a 14-year-old girl at a Northern Ireland beauty spot in 2021, when he was a minor, is sentenced to 18 months in prison at Belfast Crown Court.
- 14 June – Among those from Northern Ireland recognised in the 2024 Birthday Honours are John Caldwell, the PSNI Detective Chief Inspector who survived a murder attempt by dissident republicans, Bronagh Hinds, co-founder of Northern Ireland's Women's Coalition, and Mairtin Mac Gabhann, whose son Dáithí's campaign inspired a change in organ donation rules.
- 19 June – Sinn Féin launches its 2024 election manifesto, which includes plans for the transfer of fiscal powers from Westminster to Stormont and the creation of an all-Ireland national health service.
- 20 June – The Alliance Party launches its general election manifesto, with plans including reform of the devolved government at Stormont, and ringfencing funding for integrated eductation.
- 23 June –
  - UTV airs a general election debate featuring candidates from Northern Ireland's five main political parties: The Democratic Unionist Party's leader Gavin Robinson, Sinn Féin's John Finucane, Social Democratic and Labour Party leader Colum Eastwood, Alliance Party leader Naomi Long and Ulster Unionist Party deputy leader Robbie Butler.
  - The Earl of Shaftesbury says he wishes to transfer his estate's ownership of Lough Neagh "into a charity or community trust model, with rights of nature included".
- 24 June –
  - The Democratic Unionist Party launches its 2024 election manifesto, with policies including greater access to healthcare, opposition to assisted suicide and the removal of trade barriers within the UK.
  - Trade unions Nipsa and Unison have said they will recommend a new pay offer to be made to school staff.
- 26 June – The Social Democratic and Labour Party (SDLP) launches its election manifesto, which includes a "Marshall Plan" to address the backlog in the health service, reforms to Stormont, and a repeal of the Troubles Legacy Act.
- 27 June – The final televised debate of the 2024 general election takes place on BBC One Northern Ireland and features representatives from Northern Ireland's five main parties.
- 28 June – The Green Party of Northern Ireland launches its manifesto, which includes plans to take Lough Neagh into public ownership, reforms to Stormont, a tax on the richest one percent of people and protecting public services from cuts.
- 29 June – The Northern Ireland Conservatives launch their election manifesto with the help of Chris Heaton-Harris, the Secretary of State for Northern Ireland. Policies include upholding the Good Friday Agreement and continuing to invest in Northern Ireland. The Conservatives are fielding five candidates in Northern Ireland.

=== July ===
- 3 July –
  - A hearing at Newry Magistrates Court rules there is sufficient evidence for Sir Jeffrey Donaldson to stand trial on charges of historical sexual abuse.
  - The railway line between Lisburn and Belfast closes for the summer to facilitate engineering works for Grand Central Station.
  - One person is taken to hospital after a gas explosion at Ballyclare, County Antrim.
- 4 July –
  - The 2024 United Kingdom general election takes place.
  - Translink is to review the train fare on the Belfast–Dublin line.
- 5 July –
  - 2024 United Kingdom general election in Northern Ireland:
    - With votes in all 18 constituencies counted, the number of seats won by each party are: Sinn Féin (7), DUP (5), SDLP (2), Alliance Party (1), UUP (1), Traditional Unionist Voice (1), and Independent (1).
    - Sinn Féin wins seven seats, making it the largest party across Northern Ireland.
    - Traditional Unionist Voice (TUV) leader Jim Allister is elected Member of Parliament (MP) for North Antrim taking the seat from the DUP Ian Paisley Jr. This is the first time the TUV has gained an MP seat at Westminster.
  - The newly elected Labour prime minister, Keir Starmer, appoints Hilary Benn as Secretary of State for Northern Ireland.
- 7 July – Keir Starmer arrives in Northern Ireland for his first visit there as prime minister.
- 8 July – Starmer travels to Stormont for talks with Northern Ireland's political leaders.
- 9 July –
  - Colin Crawford is selected to replace Robin Swann as MLA for North Antrim after the latter was elected as a Westminster MP.
  - The Unite union announces two weeks of strike action for refuse collection workers at Armagh, Banbridge and Craigavon Borough Council beginning on 17 July.
- 11 July – Peter Martin becomes the DUP MLA for North Down after the previous incumbent, Alex Easton was elected to Westminster.
- 13 July – Firefighters are called to a large blaze on Newry's Greenbank Industrial Estate.
- 18 July – The Northern Ireland Executive agrees an action plan for the future management of Lough Neagh.
- 20 July – A group of estate agents who had stopped posting properties for sale on the PropertyPal website following a dispute over fees have started to use the site again following negotiations.
- 21 July –
  - A man is arrested on suspicion of attempted murder following a suspected sword attack in Newcastle, County Down.
  - Firefighters are called to a large fire at a chip shop in Armagh with above flats being evacuated.
- 24 July –
  - Justice Minister Naomi Long confirms Northern Ireland's rising prison population will require the recruitment of a further 75 prison staff at an annual cost of £3.5m. A disused cell block at Maghaberry Prison will also be reopened to accommodate more prisoners.
  - RTÉ News bulletins are geoblocked in Northern Ireland because of broadcast licencing issues over coverage of the 2024 Summer Olympics.
- 25 July – RTÉ confirms it will resume showing news broadcasts in Northern Ireland, although they will not be live during the Olympics.
- 29 July – The UK government drops its appeal against a court ruling against the Troubles Legacy Act that found part of the legislation to be unlawful.
- 30 July – 2024 Summer Olympics: Daniel Wiffen becomes the first athlete from Northern Ireland to win an Olympic gold medal since 1988 after securing first place in the 800m freestyle final.
- 31 July – The final report of the All-Island Strategic Rail Review is published, and recommends a proposed new station at Craigavon and airport rail links.

=== August ===
- 1 August – A man is arrested after threatening a group of children with a knife in a park in Lurgan, County Armagh.
- 3 August – 2024 United Kingdom riots: A protest takes place in Belfast, where anti-immigration and anti-racism demonstrators are kept apart by police. A shop on the city's Botanic Avenue is damaged when protesters and counter-protesters smash windows and damage furniture. Fireworks are also thrown during the march.
- 8 August – Stormont is recalled to discuss the 2024 United Kingdom riots.
- 9 August – 2024 United Kingdom riots: Police Scotland announces it is sending 120 of their officers to Belfast to help deal with ongoing riots in the city.
- 18 August – Hundreds of homes in Newtownards are evacuated after a suspected World War II era bomb is discovered.
- 19 August –
  - Doug Beattie resigns as leader of the Ulster Unionist Party, triggering a leadership election.
  - Blue-green algae has been found on the north coast of Northern Ireland, between Portstewart and Castlerock.
- 20 August –
  - The World War II bomb discovered in Newtownards, County Down, is destroyed with a controlled explosion.
  - 2024 Ulster Unionist Party leadership election: Nominations open to elect the next leader of the Ulster Unionist Party.
  - Shane Frane, who was on the run from prison where he was serving a sentence for the manslaughter of policewoman Philippa Reynolds, killed in a car crash in Derry in February 2013, is extradited from the Irish Republic to complete his prison sentence.
- 21 August –
  - 2024 Ulster Unionist Party leadership election: Doug Beattie rules himself out of running for re-election as UUP leader.
  - A man is arrested in Dublin over a 1982 bomb attack in County Armagh during the Troubles that killed three officers of the Royal Ulster Constabulary.
- 22 August – The man arrested over the 1982 Lurgan bombing is remanded in custody pending an extradition hearing.
- 23 August – The UK's temporary sale and supply of puberty blockers is extended to Northern Ireland.
- 24 August – Police launch a murder investigation following the discovery of a woman's body at a flat in Derry. The deceased woman is subsequently named as 65-year-old Montserrat Martorell Elias.
- 26 August – The Independent Commission for the Location of Victims' Remains begins searching farmland in County Louth for the remains of Captain Robert Nairac, a British soldier shot by the Provisional IRA while working undercover in Northern Ireland in 1977.
- 27 August –
  - 2024 Ulster Unionist Party leadership election: Mike Nesbitt announces he will enter the UUP leadership contest.
  - A man is charged over online threats made to Lilian Seenoi-Barr, the Mayor of Derry City and Strabane.
- 28 August – A man is charged with the murder of Montserrat Martorelli Elias in Derry.
- 29 August – Colum Eastwood announces he will resign as leader of the Social Democratic and Labour Party, triggering a leadership election.
- 30 August –
  - 2024 Ulster Unionist Party leadership election: After nominations close, Mike Nesbitt is the only candidate to put their name forward, and will be ratified as the party's next leader at a meeting on 14 September.
  - Communities Minister Gordon Lyons confirms that Stormont will follow Westminster in means testing Winter Fuel Payments for pensioners, announced by Chancellor Rachel Reeves in her Spending Review in July.
- 31 August – Newry Pride returns for the first time since 2019, having experienced a five-year hiatus due to a lack of funding and resources, and the COVID-19 pandemic.

=== September ===
- 1 September – 2024 Social Democratic and Labour Party leadership election: Claire Hanna, the MP for Belfast South and Mid Down, confirms her intention to run as SDLP leader.
- 5 September –
  - The Northern Ireland Executive agrees a draft programme of government, seven months after the return of Stormont.
  - Danny Kinahan resigns as Northern Ireland's first Veterans' Commissioner, saying he "cannot provide the independent voice that veterans require".
- 6 September –
  - Sir Van Morrison settles his libel case with former health minister Robin Swann after Morrison described Swann as "very dangerous" at a gig in June 2021 following the cancellation of several of his concerts during the COVID-19 pandemic.
  - A bronze statue of Queen Elizabeth II is unveiled in Antrim Castle Gardens, but receives a mixed reception.
- 8 September –
  - Stephen Farry resigns as Deputy Leader of the Alliance Party, triggering a deputy leadership election.
  - Belfast Grand Central station, a new £340m transport hub in central Belfast, opens to the public with the start of bus services.
- 9 September – Stormont unveils its Programme for Government, a document titled Our Plan: Doing What Matters Most, which sets out nine "immediate priorities" to be worked on for the duration of the government. A public consultation on the document is also launched.
- 10 September – During an appearance at Newry Crown Court, former DUP leader Sir Jeffrey Donaldson pleads not guilty to historical cases of child abuse.
- 11 September – An independent inquiry is ordered into the 1989 murder of Pat Finucane.
- 12 September –
  - 2024 Alliance Party deputy leadership election: Alliance's party executive meeting will set the timescale for election of a new deputy leader.
  - Justice Minister Naomi Long announces that an independent review of the effectiveness of the Northern Ireland Policing Board is to be carried out.
- 13 September –
  - The UK government announces it is pausing funding for the City Deals regeneration scheme in Northern Ireland.
  - The UK government says it will not provide funding to rebuild Casement Park in time for Euro 2028 because the cost of doing so has "risen dramatically" to more than £400m, and it is unlikely that it would be completed before the tournament.
- 14 September –
  - Finance Minister Caoimhe Archibald confirms that the Derry and Strabane City and Growth Deal will go ahead as planned after the City Deals initiative was paused.
  - European football governing body UEFA says it will "discuss the implications" of the UK government's decision not to fund the rebuilding of Casement Park in time for Euro 2028.
- 17 September – The leaders of Northern Ireland's five main parties write to the UK government asking it to rethink its decision to pause two City Deals.
- 20 September – Northern Ireland's Court of Appeal rules that the Troubles Legacy Act gives the UK government too much veto power over disclosure of material to the Independent Commission for Reconciliation and Information.
- 25 September –
  - Stormont launches its Domestic and Sexual Abuse Strategy, aimed at tackling instances of domestic and sexual abuse in Northern Ireland.
  - Health Minister Mike Nesbitt announces plans to introduce a new regional waiting list for breast cancer assessment.
- 28 September –
  - 2024 Ulster Unionist Party leadership election: Mike Nesbitt is confirmed as the UUP's new leader at the party's annual conference.
  - Sinn Féin president Mary Lou McDonald tells her party's annual conference in the Republic of Ireland that the next Irish government will include a Minister for Reunification if Sinn Féin are part of the administration.
- 30 September – The UK government drops plans for UK-wide labelling of goods with "Not for EU" rather than just in Northern Ireland.

=== October ===
- 2 October – Stormont approves a long-awaited project to upgrade the A5 road into a full dual carriageway.
- 7 October – School pupils are injured when a Translink double decker school bus crashes and topples over in County Down.
- 8 October – The Police Service of Northern Ireland refers itself to the ombudsman over the death of Mary Ward, whose remains were found at her home in Belfast on 1 October, after it emerged police had been contacted by her in the weeks preceding her death to report incidence of violence.
- 12 October – The northbound carriageway of the M5 motorway is closed following a collision involving six vehicles.
- 13 October – The first trains depart from Belfast Grand Central station as the new transport hub becomes fully operational.
- 20 October – An amber weather alert is in place for western Scotland and the north and west of Northern Ireland as Storm Ashley arrives in the UK; yellow alerts are issued for other parts of Scotland, Northern Ireland and the Welsh coast.
- 21 October – Education Minister Paul Givan announces plans to make it compulsory for children to stay in education or training until they are 18.
- 22 October – Convicted murderer Thomas McCabe, arrested by Gardaí in August 2024 after being on the run for a year, is returned to prison in Northern Ireland.
- 23 October –
  - Following a trial at Coleraine Crown Court, Julie Ann McIlwaine is found guilty of the murder of her partner, James Crossley, who she stabbed to death at their home in Dunmurry while he slept in March 2022.
  - Health Minister Mike Nesbitt pledges £13m a year for the families of children with complex needs.
- 25 October – Alexander McCartney, 26, who organised one of the largest catfishing operations on the Internet, is sentenced to life in prison with a minimum term of 20 years. His crimes, which targeted around 3,500 children across 30 countries, are described by Mr Justice O'Hara as ones of "sadism and depravity" which "scarred" the childhoods of his victims.

=== November ===
- 1 November –
  - Irish Health Minister Stephen Donnelly announces that the Irish Government will fund 150 places for students from the Republic of Ireland to study health at Ulster University at a cost of €9.5m (£8m).
  - Power NI, Northern Ireland's largest electricity supplier, announces a 4% increase in household electricity prices from December, adding an extra £38 to the average bill.
- 5 November –
  - It is announced that First Minister Michelle O'Neill will become the first senior Sinn Féin figure to take part in an official Remembrance Sunday ceremony in Belfast, which is scheduled to take place on 10 November.
  - Sister Clare Crockett, a Roman Catholic nun from Derry, who was killed in an earthquake at a school in Ecuador in 2016, is declared a Servant of God by the Catholic Church, the first step on the process to sainthood.
- 10 November – First Minister Michelle O'Neill becomes the first senior Sinn Féin figure to take part in an official Remembrance Sunday ceremony, held in Belfast.
- 12 November – The Police Service of Northern Ireland says it was not "rigorous enough" in its investigation into the death of showjumper Katie Simpson.
- 13 November – The NASUWT, INTO and UTU teaching unions announce a ballot of their members over a pay dispute.
- 14 November – BBC News NI reports that Health Minister Mike Nesbitt has made a pay offer to Northern Ireland's health unions that would see pay backdated to August, which they are considering.
- 15 November –
  - Communities Minister Gordon Lyons attends a football match between Northern Ireland and Belarus despite UK government guidance that the game should not go ahead because of sanctions against Belarus over its stance over the Ukraine War.
  - The Parliamentary Commissioner for Standards launches an investigation into Democratic Unionist Party MP Sammy Wilson for an alleged breach of lobbying rules after he failed to declare an interest when tabling a question on the Turkish Republic of Northern Cyprus, and following a visit to the area.
- 16 November – The investigation into institutions for unmarried mothers in Northern Ireland discovers evidence that pregnant women and babies may have spent time in private nursing homes as a "measure of secrecy".
- 18 November – The Education Authority (EA) cancels a £500m contract with Fujitsu for new IT systems in Northern Ireland's schools following the British Post Office scandal.
- 19 November – Communities Minister Gordon Lyons announces a £100 one-off payment for pensioners in Northern Ireland affected by changes to winter fuel payments.
- 20 November –
  - Healthcare company Harmony CCS Limited is fined £50,000 following the death of a patient who fell from the edge of her bed at a Lisburn care home; she had needed two carers to help support her, but was in the care of only one at the time of the incident.
  - BBC News NI reports that the estimated cost of the Casement Park development has fallen from in excess of £300m to £270m.
  - A bus carrying eight primary age schoolchildren crashes at Lisbellaw, County Fermanagh; The Police Service of Northern Ireland confirms that nobody was injured.
- 23 November – Storm Bert: A number of people in County Down and County Tyrone are trapped in their homes by floods after Storm Bert brings high winds and heavy rain to Northern Ireland.
- 24 November – Storm Bert: A fresh yellow weather warning for high winds comes into force.
- 25 November – The Department of Health announces that food producers will be required to add folic acid to non-wholemeal flour from 2026 in order to protect newborn babies from serious brain and spine problems.
- 27 November – The majority of flights to and from Belfast City Airport are cancelled following a Met Office yellow weather warning for fog.
- 28 November –
  - Paul Dunleavy, a Christian Brother and former school principal already serving time in prison for two accounts of sexual offences against children, is sentenced to a further ten years in prison after pleading guilty to a further 36 historical offences; He is expected to die in prison.
  - Detective Chief Inspector John Caldwell, who was targeted in an attempted assassination, is awarded the King's Police Medal.
- 29 November – Belfast rappers Kneecap win a discrimination case against the UK government over withdrawal of an arts grant after the Government of Keir Starmer decides pursuing the case would not be in the public interest. Conservative leader Kemi Badenoch, who was the minister who took the decision to withdraw the grant, describes the decision as "unbelievable".
- 30 November – Ofcom rules that the BBC broke the rules of its operating licence by cutting back on news programmes on Northern Ireland's BBC Radio Foyle.

=== December ===
- 1 December –
  - New regulations come into law requiring privately rented properties to have smoke alarms fitted in the room most frequently used for "general daytime living purposes", as well as in every circulation space on each floor.
  - A woman in her 20s, later identified as Chloe Ferris, dies at a nightclub in Belfast; two men are subsequently arrested on drug related charges following the death.
- 4 December – At Westminster, Secretary of State for Northern Ireland Hilary Benn begins the process of repealing the controversial Legacy Act.
- 5 December –
  - The Stormont Executive approves a ban on fracking in Northern Ireland.
  - Stormont approves a three year extension to welfare mitigation payments which were introduced to soften the impact of the bedroom tax.
- 6 December –
  - At a hearing at Belfast Crown Court, the unnamed British soldier known as Soldier F pleads not guilty to the murder of two men during the 1972 Bloody Sunday massacre.
  - A number of festive events scheduled for the coming days are cancelled ahead of the arrival of Storm Darragh.
- 7 December – Storm Darragh: Around 48,000 homes are left without power after Storm Darragh brings high winds and heavy rain to Northern Ireland. NIE Networks is able to restore some services, but says around 22,000 homes remain without electricity, and that it will open community assistance centres the following day.
- 8 December – NIE Networks says it may be a number of days before power can be fully restored to some homes following Storm Darragh.
- 10 December –
  - The Stormont Assembly debates Northern Ireland's post-Brexit trade agreement, and votes to extend it for a further four years.
  - Stormont votes to permanently ban the sale or supply of puberty blockers to those aged under 18.
- 12 December – Mervyn Storey is announced as the new chair of the board of the Education Authority.
- 14 December –
  - The Police Service of Northern Ireland says that 20 officers have been injured in incidents over the course of 24 hours.
  - Anne Marie McAleese announces she is leaving BBC Radio Ulster's Your Place And Mine, which she has presented since 1991, and will present the final show on Saturday 15 February 2025.
  - Police launch a murder investigation following the death of a woman, subsequently identified as Karen Cummings, in Banbridge, County Down.
- 16 December – A civil case brought against former Sinn Féin president Gerry Adams by three Provisional IRA bomb victims is to be heard in London in 2026.
  - Members of Northern Ireland's three largest teaching unions – the NASUWT, INTO and UTU – vote overwhelmingly to take strike action over pay.
  - A coroner's inquest into the death of Patrick Crawford concludes that the 15-year-old, who was shot dead while walking through the grounds of Belfast's Royal Victoria Hospital on the evening of 10 August 1975, was "more likely than not" killed by a British Army soldier.
- 17 December – The High Court orders Northern Ireland Secretary Hilary Benn to establish a public inquiry into the May 1997 murder of GAA official Sean Brown in County Antrim after ruling the UK government acted unlawfully by failing to investigate the full extent of state collusion in the killing.
- 18 December – Two men are remanded in custody charged with the murder of children's nurse Karen Cummings.
- 19 December –
  - The Stormont Executive agrees to release its draft budget for the 2025/26 financial year for public consultation, with much of the £19bn budget earmarked for health and education.
  - Belfast shipbuilder Harland & Wolff is saved from bankruptcy by a deal with Navantia, Spain's state shipbuilder.
- 20 December –
  - Following an investigation into an incident in Derry in 2022, police ombudsman Marie Anderson concludes that police "did not have enough time" to stop republican paramilitaries from firing shots into the air.
  - A man dies following a collision between a car and a lorry in Ballynure, County Antrim.
- 22 December – All flights in and out of Belfast City Airport are cancelled after an Aer Lingus plane is forced to make an emergency landing during strong winds.
- 23 December – Olympic champion Daniel Wiffen is named the 2024 BBC Northern Ireland Sports Personality of the Year.
- 24 December – Northern Ireland experiences its warmest Christmas Eve in record, with temperatures reaching 14.3°C at Magilligan on the north coast.
- 27 December – Official Irish government papers have revealed that Queen Elizabeth II expressed her relief that Northern Ireland's "silly marching business" was quieter than expected when the Irish ambassador to the UK visited her at Buckingham Palace in 2000.
- 30 December –
  - Sinn Féin Minister Conor Murphy announces plans to contest the Seanad election, saying he will resign as a member of the Stormont Assembly if successful.
  - 2025 New Year Honours: Among those recognised in the New Year Honours is singer and broadcaster Hugo Duncan who becomes an MBE.
- 31 December – Darryl Wilson, a councillor of Causeway Coast and Glens Borough Council, resigns from the Ulster Unionist Party following a controversy over the selection for an Assembly seat, and will continue as an independent.

=== Scheduled events ===
- April – May – 2024 Ulster Senior Football Championship

== Holidays ==
- 1 January – New Year's Day
- 17 March – Saint Patrick's Day
- 29 March – Good Friday
- 1 April – Easter Monday
- 6 May – Early May bank holiday
- 27 May – Spring May Bank Holiday
- 12 July – Orangemen's Day
- 26 August – Summer Bank Holiday
- 25 December – Christmas Day
- 26 December – Saint Stephen's Day

== Deaths ==
- 26 January – Walter Love, 88, Northern Irish broadcaster (BBC Radio Ulster).
- 24 February – Chris Nicholl, 77, English-born Northern Irish football player (Aston Villa, Southampton, Northern Ireland national team) and manager.
- 3 March – Dan McCartan, 84, Northern Irish Gaelic footballer, selector and manager.
- 18 March – Pearse McAuley, 59, Northern Irish paramilitary (Provisional IRA) and convicted criminal. (body discovered on this date)
- 24 March – David Capper, 91, Northern Irish journalist and television reporter (BBC Ireland correspondent). (death reported on this date)
- 28 April – Stephen Grimason, 87, Northern Irish journalist and editor of BBC News NI. (death announced on this date)
- 17 May – Pat Buckley, 72, Irish Independent Catholic bishop. (death announced on this date)
- 7 June – Rose-Marie, 68, Northern Irish singer and television personality.
- 26 July – John Bennett, 82, Northern Irish broadcaster.
- 2 August – Tommy Cassidy, 73, Northern Irish football player (Newcastle, national team) and manager (APOEL). (death announced on this date)
- 15 August – Jim McLaughlin, 83, Northern Irish football player (Shrewsbury Town, national team) and manager (Derry City). (death announced on this date)
- 16 October – Roy Walsh, 75, Northern Irish Provisional IRA volunteer and convicted criminal (1973 Old Bailey bombing)
- 31 October – Candy Devine, 85, Australian radio broadcaster (Downtown Radio) and singer. (death announced on this date)
- 6 November – Anna Lo, 74, Northern Irish politician, MLA (2007–2016).
- 20 November – Ken Reid, 69, Northern Irish journalist and political editor (UTV). (death announced on this date)
- 12 December – Tommy Robb, 90, Northern Irish Grand Prix motorcycle racer.
- 30 December – Paddy Hill, 80, Northern Irish human rights campaigner, wrongfully convicted of the 1974 Birmingham pub bombings.

== See also ==
- 2024 in England
- 2024 in Scotland
- 2024 in Wales
