= 2027 in Wales =

- Centuries: 19th; 20th; 21st
- Decades: 2000s; 2010s; 2020s
- See also: List of years in Wales; Timeline of Welsh history 2027 in The United Kingdom England Scotland Elsewhere

Events from the year 2027 in Wales.

== Events ==
=== Predicted and scheduled ===
- 6 May – 2027 Welsh local elections
- 7–9 May – The inaugural Land of Song Festival will take place at the Principality Stadium, featuring Andrea Bocelli's first performance in Wales for 22 years.
- 31 July–7 August - 2027 Maldwyn Meirionnydd National Eisteddfod in Glantwymyn, Powys.

== Holidays ==
- 1 January – New Year's Day
- 26 March – Good Friday
- 29 March – Easter Monday
- 3 May – Early May bank holiday
- 31 May – Spring May Bank Holiday
- 30 August – Summer Bank Holiday
- 25 December – Christmas Day
- 26 December – Boxing Day
