= 2027 in Scotland =

- Centuries: 19th; 20th; 21st
- Decades: 2000s; 2010s; 2020s
- See also: List of years in Scotland; Timeline of Scottish history 2027 in: The UK • England • Wales • Elsewhere; Scottish football: 2026–27

The following is a list of planned or scheduled events of the year 2027 in Scotland.

== Predicted or scheduled events ==
- 2027 Scottish local elections
- 2027 Tour de France
- 2026–27 Scottish Championship
