= 2025 in Northern Ireland =

- Centuries: 20th; 21st
- Decades: 2000s; 2010s; 2020s
- See also: 2025 in the United Kingdom; 2025 in Ireland; Other events of 2025; List of years in Northern Ireland

Events from the year 2025 in Northern Ireland.

== Incumbents ==
- First Minister of Northern Ireland: Michelle O'Neill
- Deputy First Minister of Northern Ireland: Emma Little-Pengelly
- Secretary of State for Northern Ireland: Hilary Benn

== Events ==
=== January ===
- 1 January –
  - Responsibility for regulating medicines in Northern Ireland returns to UK authorities under the Windsor Framework, with the Medicines and Healthcare Products Regulatory Agency (MHRA) having UK-wide responsibility for the licencing of medicines.
  - The Met Office issues a yellow weather warning for ice as temperatures are set to fall overnight on 1–2 January.
- 2 January – Archaeologists announce they have discovered the remains of a courtyard and building complex dating back at least 300 years on the Castle Ward estate in County Down.
- 4 January – A statue of musician Rory Gallagher is unveiled at Belfast's Ulster Hall.
- 6 January – Criminal barristers in Northern Ireland begin a four-week strike, withdrawing their services from legally-aided court cases in a dispute over legal aid.
- 10 January – A man is charged in connection with the shooting of an off-duty police officer in County Antrim on 6 January. He is remanded in custody the following day, charged with nine offences including attempted murder.
- 12 January – A ceremony is held in Madrid's Cathedral of Alcala de Henares to recognise Sister Clare Crockett, a nun from Derry who was killed during an earthquake in Ecuador in 2016, as a candidate for sainthood.
- 13 January – Addressing reporters as Stormont reconvenes after the Christmas break, First Minister Michelle O'Neill describes the pressure on Northern Ireland's health service as "dire and diabolical".
- 15 January – Prime Minister Sir Keir Starmer tells the House of Commons the UK government will look at "every conceivable way" to prevent Gerry Adams, the former President of Sinn Féin, from receiving compensation after it emerged that repealing the Troubles Legacy Act could allow him to claim compensation for unlawful detention during the 1970s.
- 16 January –
  - Northern Ireland and the Irish Republic announce restrictions on animal imports from Germany following an outbreak of foot-and-mouth disease.
  - The White House confirms that former Democratic Unionist Party MP Ian Paisley Jr will attend the inauguration of Donald Trump in Washington.
- 17 January –
  - The Court of Appeal upholds the convictions of George Kirkpatrick, Eric Cullen and Cyril Cullen, known as the Castlewellan Three, for the murder of Catholic teenager Francis Rice in Castlewellan in 1975. The men, who served 14 years in prison, have always denied responsibility for the crime.
  - A "significant" fire breaks out at a recycling plant in Coleraine in the early hours of the morning. The Fire Service later concludes the blaze started accidentally.
  - The Department of Agriculture, Environment and Rural Affairs confirms that bird flu has been found in three wild birds in Northern Ireland, the first occurrence of the illness in the wild since 2023.
- 20 January –
  - Northern Ireland's civil servants are offered a 9% pay deal, with a 3% rise backdated to August 2024, and a 6% pay rise from August 2025.
  - Following his conviction at Dublin's Central Criminal Court in December, Irish Defence Force soldier Kielan Mooney, who is from Derry, is sentenced to eight and a half years in prison for the rape of a female colleague at a hotel in Dublin.
- 22 January – The Department for Infrastructure launches a consultation on whether MoT tests for some private cars, motorcycles and light goods vehicles should be changed to every two years.
- 25 January – Sinn Féin lifts its suspension on Belfast City Councillor JJ Magee following an investigation by the Local Government Commissioner for Standards.
- 28 January –
  - A public inquiry begins into the 1998 Omagh bombing.
  - BBC News reports that planned changes at BT's Belfast headquarters could mean the loss of 90 jobs.
- 29 January – The High Court clears retailer Lidl to open its first in store pub, to be situated in Dundonald, County Down, after rejecting a legal challenge to the plans from another trader.
- 30 January – Two schoolchildren are treated for minor injuries after the bus they are travelling on collides with a fallen tree on a road near Lisburn.
- 31 January – Teachers in Northern Ireland are offered a 5.5% pay increase, backdated to 1 September 2024.

=== February ===
- 3 February – Economy Minister Conor Murphy steps down from the post and announces he will leave Stormont after being elected to the Irish Seanad. Caoimhe Archibald is appointed to replace him as Economy Minister.
- 5 February – Causeway Coast and Glens Borough Council confirms it is to go ahead with plans to introduce parking charges at four car parks on the north coast.
- 6 February –
  - An inquest into the February 1992 shooting of four Provisional IRA men by the SAS at Clonoe, County Tyrone, finds the use of force against them was unjustified.
  - The High Court rules that Police Ombudsman Marie Anderson acted "ultra vires" by reaching conclusions that amounted to determinations of misconduct by her findings in reports into three Troubles-era killings. Anderson subsequently says she will appeal the decision.
  - The majority of teaching staff in Northern Ireland have rejected a 5.5% pay increase, and voted to take industrial action that falls short of striking.
- 13 February – Organisers of Pride events in Northern Ireland have said political parties who supported a ban on the sale or supply of puberty blockers to under 18s will not be invited to events.
- 14 February – Kevin Barry McIntyre, who was convicted of posting abusive messages online about Lilian Seenoi-Barr, Northern Ireland's first black mayor, is sentenced to five months in prison.
- 15 February –
  - Research published by the Northern Ireland Assembly indicates Northern Ireland to be the "least diverse" part of the United Kingdom.
  - Anne Marie McAleese presents her final edition of BBC Radio Ulster's Your Place And Mine, which she has presented since 1991.
- 16 February – Around 64,000 birds are being culled after avian flu was discovered at a poultry farm in Dungannon, County Tyrone, on 14 February.
- 17 February – Social Democratic and Labour Party leader Claire Hanna announces that the party will decline any invitations to the White House for St Patrick's Day celebrations due to Donald Trump's stance on the Gaza conflict.
- 18 February – Soldier F, the British paratrooper charged with two counts of murder and five of attempted murder during the Bloody Sunday massacre, will stand trial in September, a judge has said.
- 19 February – Plans for a new £671m 177-bed children's hospital within the grounds of Belfast's Royal Victoria Hospital are given the go-ahead.
- 20 February –
  - The findings of the inquest into the Clonoe shootings are to be referred to Northern Ireland's Director of Public Prosecutions.
  - The Met Office issues two yellow weather warnings for high winds, covering 21 and 23 February.
- 21 February – Sinn Féin confirms it will boycott St Patrick's Day events at the White House over US President Donald Trump's stance on the Israel-Gaza conflict.
- 23 February –
  - A man is taken to hospital following a shooting incident in the Bell Steel Manor area of Dunmurry in west Belfast.
  - 16,000 birds at a poultry farm at Pomeroy, County Tyrone, are to be culled following the discovery of a suspected case of avian flu.
- 24 February –
  - Deputy First Minister Emma Little-Pengelly confirms she will travel to Washington for St Patrick's Day celebrations at the White House.
  - A third case of suspected bird flu is found in Country Tyrone, this time at a premises in Cookstown; 32,000 birds at the facility will be humanely destroyed.
- 25 February –
  - The UK and Irish governments announce plans to explore formal engagement with paramilitary groups to help bring about their disbandment.
  - Infrastructure minister Liz Kimmins tells Stormont that plans to extend Belfast's Glider bus service to the north and south of the city will be scaled back because they are "not economically viable".
- 27 February – Ministers agree a programme for government in Northern Ireland.

=== March ===
- 2 March – A service of reflection is held in Newry to remember the nine Royal Ulster Constabulary officers killed in the 1985 Newry mortar attack.
- 3 March – The Stormont Executive's programme for government, titled Doing What Matters Most, is presented to the Northern Ireland Assembly following agreement by the Executive the previous week.
- 4 March – Belfast based IT firm Kainos announces it is making 190 people redundant through job cuts.
- 5 March – The Stormont Executive launches the process to appoint an Irish Language Commissioner and a Commissioner for the Ulster Scots and Ulster British tradition following criticism from the United Nations Committee on Economic, Social and Cultural Rights.
- 7 March –
  - During a hearing at Craigavon Crown Court, Stephen-Lee McIlvenny, 21, is sentenced to 23 years in prison after admitting 77 offences involving the sexual abuse and blackmail of three children.
  - Connswater Shopping Centre in east Belfast is placed into receivership and set to close in two weeks if a buyer is not found.
- 8 March –
  - The Department of Education is facing legal challenges over decisions by Education Minister Paul Givan to reject applications by two schools in County Down to become integrated.
  - Belfast is announced as the host of the 2026 Fleadh Cheoil na hÉireann (All-Ireland Fleadh), which will take place in August 2026.
- 9 March – Following an unseasonably warm spell of weather, the highest temperature of the year so far is recorded at Killowen, County Down, with a high of 17.2 °C.
- 13 March – Craig Rowland, who shook his infant son so violently it caused lifechanging injuries that led to the boy's death, is sentenced to life imprisonment with a minimum term of 20 years.
- 14 March – Former teacher Judith Evans is sentenced to two years in prison after pleading guilty to grooming and sexual intercourse with a schoolboy; she is also placed on the sex offenders register for life.
- 19 March –
  - King Charles III and Queen Camilla pay an official visit to Northern Ireland, which includes a private meeting with the First and Deputy First Ministers.
  - Three men convicted of the murder of Ian Ogle in west Belfast are sentenced to life imprisonment with minimum terms of 20 years following a non-jury trial.
  - The Natural Hazards Partnership issues an amber warning for possible wildfires for the following day when dry and breezy weather conditions are expected.
- 21 March –
  - Belfast Pride becomes the latest of a number of organisers to ban political parties who supported a ban on the sale or supply of puberty blockers to under 18 from their events.
  - Firefighters attend and extinguish a gorse fire near the Silent Valley Reservoir in the Mourne Mountains.
- 22 March –
  - Flights between London Heathrow Airport and airports in Northern Ireland resume after Heathrow was closed the previous day following a fire at an electricity substation supplying power to the airport.
  - It is reported that the UK government is to challenge the inquest ruling into the 1992 Clonoe ambush.
- 28 March –
  - Teachers in Northern Ireland reject a 5.5% pay increase, the second time they have done so.
  - Sinn Féin councillor Cathal King is suspended for two months from Newry, Mourne and Down District Council by the Northern Ireland Local Government Commission for Standards for being drunk in charge of a car.
- 31 March – Edwin Poots, the Speaker of the Northern Ireland Assembly, says Stormont is engaging with police over abuse faced by Assembly members.

=== April ===
- 1 April – Members of the University and College Union vote to take strike action in a dispute over pay.
- 4 April – Teaching unions accept a revised 5.5% pay increase for 2024–25, averting potential strike action.
- 5 April –
  - The National Hazards Partnership issues an amber warning for wildfires following a prolonged spell of dry, warm weather.
  - A major incident is declared after a gorse fire breaks out on Sandbank Road, Hilltown, County Down, forcing a number of properties to be evacuated. The fire is brought under control by the following day, and subsequently treated as arson.
- 11 April – Prime Minister Sir Keir Starmer travels to Northern Ireland to meet First Minister Michelle O'Neill and Deputy First Minister Emma Little-Pengelly to discuss US trade tariffs.
- 12 April – Firefighters tackle a gorse fire in Maghera, with ten appliances in attendance.
- 13 April – Rory McIlroy becomes the sixth golfer and the first European to win a career grand slam when he wins the Masters Tournament in Augusta National Golf Club in Georgia, USA.
- 19 April – Aontú submits a bill to the bills office of Dáil Éireann, seeking to allow Northern Ireland citizens to vote in Irish presidential elections.
- 21 April – Two men are arrested after a dissident republican parade in Derry, where about 50 people marched in paramilitary-style uniform from Creggan to Free Derry Corner.
- 23 April – The Police Service of Northern Ireland launches a pilot scheme allowing victims of crime to speak to police officers via video call.
- 25 April – It is announced that First Minister Michelle O'Neill will attend the funeral of Pope Francis in Rome on 26 April.
- 26 April – First Minister Michelle O'Neill is among international dignitaries to attend the funeral of Pope Francis in Rome.
- 27 April – Counter-terrorism officers from the Metropolitan Police are reported to be assessing video footage of rap group Kneecap allegedly calling for the death of British Conservative MPs.
- 28 April –
  - The UK government describes alleged comments made by rap group Kneecap as "completely unacceptable" and suggests they should not receive government funding.
  - Kneecap issues an apology to the families of murdered MPs Jo Cox and David Amess following their comments.
- 29 April – The Eden Project cancels a planned appearance by Kneecap at its 2025 Eden Sessions festival in July.
- 30 April –
  - The UK government is to challenge a Court of Appeal ruling that found its refusal to hold a public inquiry into the killing of GAA official Sean Brown was unlawful.
  - A further three Kneecap concerts, in Hamburg, Berlin and Cologne, are cancelled following the emergence of footage in which a band member called for MPs to be killed.

=== May ===
- 1 May – Belfast City Council backs a proposal by the Alliance Party for a six week pilot scheme to allow shops in the city to open on a Sunday.
- 4 May – Tilahun Nigussie and Millicent Kibet are the male and female winners of the 43rd Belfast City Marathon.
- 7 May –
  - The Irish Football Association announces that Windsor Park will be renamed Clearer Twist National Stadium at Windsor Park following the agreement of a "multi-million-pound" eight-year sponsorship deal.
  - Firefighters attend a large gorse fire at Clogher in County County Tyrone.
- 8 May – Eamon Martin, the Archbishop of Armagh and Primate of All Ireland, pays tribute to the newly-elected Pope Leo XIV, describing him as "calm, affable and approachable", and a "friend of Ireland".
- 15 May – Education Minister Paul Givan announces that the Northern Ireland Childcare Subsidy Scheme will be extended to cover primary school age children from September.
- 16 May – A judge at Newry Crown Court sets a proposed date of 3 November for the trial of Sir Jeffrey Donaldson and his wife, Lady Eleanor Donaldson, on historic child abuse charges. A trial scheduled for March was postponed while Lady Donaldson received treatment for a health problem.
- 17 May – Several thousand people attend the March for Trans Rights, held in Belfast City Centre as part of International Day Against Homophobia, Transphobia and Biphobia.
- 20 May –
  - Julie Ann McIlwaine is sentenced to life imprisonment with a minimum term of 12 years for the murder of her partner, James Joseph Crossley, while he slept at her former home in Dunmurry in March 2022.
  - Economy Minister Caoimhe Archibald confirms she will not increase university tuition fees above the level of inflation.
- 21 May –
  - First Minister Michelle O'Neill tells the UK COVID-19 Inquiry there is "no evidence" to suggest her attendance at the funeral of prominent Irish republican Bobby Storey had any impact on public compliance with lockdown rules.
  - Northern Ireland's first regional obesity management service is approved, paving the way for patients in Northern Ireland to have access to weight loss drugs through the health service.
- 22 May – Health Minister Mike Nesbitt signs off a pay increase for health staff following a recommendation from the Pay Review Body that doctors should receive a 4% pay increase, and nurses and other healthcare workers a 3.6% increase.
- 26 May – The public are urged to stay away after a minke whale beached and died at Portstewart Strand in County Londonderry. The whale's remains are removed and disposed of the following day.
- 29 May – The Riverside Theatre at Ulster University's Coleraine campus, billed as Northern Ireland's oldest professional theatre outside Belfast, is set to close in August after 50 years.

=== June ===
- 3 June –
  - The Royal Society for the Protection of Birds Northern Ireland (RSPB NI) describes the presence of six calling male corncrakes on Rathlin Island during the 2025 breeding season as a "record-breaking" milestone. It is the highest number recorded there since the 1970s.
  - In an email to staff, Adam Smyth, the director of BBC Northern Ireland, says the BBC has "no intention" of blocking its news or other output in the Republic of Ireland.
- 6 June –
  - The Department of Health announces that a targeted vaccination programme against gonorrhoea across Northern Ireland has been approved and will begin in August.
  - John David Scott is sentenced to life imprisonment with a minimum of 19 years for the murder of his partner, Natasha Melendez, in spring 2020.
  - Translink announces that bus services from Downpatrick, Newcastle and Ballynahinch will operate from Belfast Grand Central Station from July.
- 7 June – The Northern Ireland Fire and Rescue Service confirms that five people were taken to hospital following a chemical spill at a cheese factory in County Down late the previous evening.
- 9 June – Riots breaks out in Ballymena after two Romanian teenagers were charged for the attempted rape of a teenage girl. Two police cars and multiple properties were damaged, with 15 police officers being injured and one rioter arrested.
- 10 June –
  - A second night of disorder in Ballymena leaves 17 police officers injured as five people are arrested. Protests also break out in Belfast, Carrickfergus, Coleraine, Lisburn and Newtownabbey.
  - Belfast Zoo is temporarily closed after E.coli is found in a water sample.
- 11 June –
  - A third night of violence breaks out in Northern Ireland, with a leisure centre damaged in Larne, County Antrim.
  - Former teacher and Catholic priest Canon Patrick McEntee is found guilty of eight counts of historical child abuse involving four boys at a school in Enniskillen.
  - 2025 Spending Review: The UK government is to contribute £50m towards the redevelopment of Casement Park.
- 12 June –
  - The Police Ombudsman concludes that a 1989 investigation into the sectarian murder of Catholic man John Devine in west Belfast was "seriously defective".
  - A fourth night of disorder breaks out in Northern Ireland, albeit on a smaller scale than previous nights, with protestors throwing bricks and masonry at police in Portadown, County Armagh.
- 13 June –
  - Disorder breaks out in Portadown for a second night. Water cannons are used on protestors after they throw objects at police.
  - Colin Crawford announces he is stepping down as the Ulster Unionist MLA for North Antrim.
- 14 June – An anti-racism demonstration is held in Belfast City Centre following several nights of disturbance.
- 16 June – A 13-year-old girl and her mother appear in court in Coleraine in connection with disorder in Ballymena.
- 17 June –
  - Marie Anderson, Northern Ireland's Police Ombudsman, announces that she is taking a leave of absence with immediate effect due to what she describes as commentary "detracting" from her work.
  - Sectarian violence breaks out in the Nailors Row area of Derry, resulting in fourteen police officers being injured and the arrest of eleven people.
- 18 June – Aaron Thomas Curragh, of Belfast, who sent threatening online messages to Deputy First Minister Emma Little-Pengelly and smashed the windows of the office of a Democratic Unionist Party colleague, is sentenced to 31 months, of which he must serve half in custody and half on licence.
- 26 June – Matthew Brogan, who took part in racially motivated violence in Belfast in August 2024 "out of boredom" is sentenced to 20 months in prison.
- 28 June – Police launch a murder investigation following the death of Sarah Montgomery, a 27-year-old mother-of-two. Montgomery, who was found at a property in Donaghadee, County Down, was also pregnant at the time of her death.

=== July ===
- 1 July – A man is charged with the murder of Sarah Montgomery, as well as the destruction of her unborn child.
- 3 July –
  - Ciaran Mulgrew is sacked as chair of the Belfast Health and Social Care Trust.
  - The partner of Ashling Murphy reaches a settlement with BBC Northern Ireland over a defamation case concerning a November 2023 edition of The View which discussed his victim impact statement.
- 9 July – An Ulster Protestant loyalist bonfire for the Eleventh Night in Moygashel is widely condemned as anti-immigrant and has been described as "incitement to hatred".
- 10 July – The Police Service declares the loyalist bonfire in Belfast a "major incident" due to the threat the event poses to an electrical substation that supplies both the Belfast City Hospital and the Royal Victoria Hospital.
- 12 July – Gavin Robinson, the leader of the Democratic Unionist Party, calls for greater co-operation between unionists in his speech following the Twelfth of July parade in Belfast.
- 13 July – An Orange parade that passes the Ardoyne shops, and that has been a flashpoint of trouble in previous years, passes without incident.
- 17 July – The UK government announces that the voting age is to be lowered to 16 in time for the next UK general election, but several parties in Northern Ireland call for it to be implemented in time for the 2027 Northern Ireland Assembly election.
- 19 July – Danske Bank apologises for a "technical issue" that affected their debit cards in Northern Ireland, and says things are working again.
- 20 July –
  - Some weather stations record Northern Ireland's wettest July day on record following heavy rain and flash floods.
  - The Fire and Rescue Service confirms that a fire at the old Foyle College in Derry is being treated as suspicious.
- 22 July – The first driverless vehicle in Northern Ireland, a shuttle bus in Belfast's Titanic Quarter, begins a pilot run.
- 23 July – A woman and two children, subsequently named as Vanessa Whyte and her two teenage children, Sara and James Rutledge, are killed in a shooting at a property in Maguiresbridge, County Fermanagh.
- 30 July – Former Downing Street Chief of Staff Sue Gray is appointed to the board of governors of Queen's University Belfast.

=== August ===
- 3 August – The Met Office issues a yellow weather warning for high winds ahead of the arrival of Storm Floris.
- 6 August – A batch of 150mg Tom & Ollie traditional hummus and some potted coriander plants supplied by O'Hanlon Herbs, both of which are supplied to a number of major supermarkets, are recalled amid a listeria concern.
- 8 August –
  - Part of the Giant's Causeway is cordoned off following a rockfall.
  - River Island stores in Bangor and Lisburn are among 33 UK outlets that will close following High Court approval of the company's restructuring plans.
- 12 August –
  - Two men are charged in connection with the 2023 shooting of John Caldwell.
  - Batches of Spar Chèvre Goats Cheese are recalled amid concerns about the presence of listeria.
  - Chancellor Rachel Reeves travels to Stormont to meet ministers, who urge her to use the next budget to invest in public services.
- 13 August – Two men are remanded in custody over the shooting of John Caldwell after appearing before magistrates.
- 14 August – A new policy for Northern Ireland's civil servants will require them to work at least two days in the office from September. Many have continued to work from home following the COVID-19 pandemic.
- 16 August – Grace Chambers, aged 97, becomes Europe's oldest Parkrunner to reach the 250 run milestone after completing a run at Belfast's Ormeau Park.
- 19 August – Two men are injured after a petrol bomb is thrown into The Toby Jug pub in Armagh. A man is subsequently arrested and charged over the incident.
- 22 August – A number of homes and businesses in north Belfast are evacuated following a security alert.
- 24 August –
  - A man is detained by police following a security alert in north Belfast which required a number of people to be evacuated.
  - Three children are taken to hospital after they are hit by a car while playing on a pavement in west Belfast.
  - Cullyhanna GAC player Pearse Casey is taken to hospital after sustaining a head injury during an Armagh Senior Football Championship game against Mullaghbawn GAC.
- 26 August – Reform UK leader Nigel Farage says that in order to deport 600,000 asylum seekers, a government headed by his party would leave the European Convention on Human Rights (ECHR) which may require a renegotiation of the terms of the Good Friday Agreement which has the ECHR written into it.
- 27 August – Investigations are continuing after two young people died and two were hospitalised after attending the Emerge dance music festival in Belfast over the August Bank Holiday weekend.
- 31 August – Colum Eastwood, the former leader of the Social Democratic and Labour Party, rules himself out of running in the 2025 Irish presidential election.

=== September ===
- 9 September – Alliance Party MLA Nuala McAllister is ejected from the chamber of the Northern Ireland Assembly following a clash with deputy speaker Steve Aiken during which she described him as "patronising".
- 12 September – Roman Catholic priest Canon Patrick McEntee, of Dromore, County Tyrone, is sentenced to seven years in prison following his conviction for eight counts of sexual abuse against four boys between the late 1970s and late 1980s.
- 13 September – Afghan journalist Salma Niazi is announced as the winner of the 2025 One Young World 'Lyra McKee Award for Bravery' for her work reporting on the rights of women in Afghanistan.
- 14 September – The University and College Union urges Queen's University Belfast to "swiftly and publicly" suspend the university's links with "known associates" of convicted paedophile Jeffrey Epstein.
- 16 September – Mark McEwan steps down as Standards Commissioner at Stormont a week after his appointment to take up the post of Deputy Chief Constable of Surrey Police.
- 19 September – Secretary of State for Northern Ireland Hilary Benn and Tánaiste Simon Harris announce a new UK and Irish deal on the legacy of the Troubles to replace the Northern Ireland Troubles (Legacy and Reconciliation) Act, with Harris describing the new framework as "a big step forward".
- 24 September – Publication of a report by Angus McCullough KC that highlights a number of instances of how the Police Service of Northern Ireland used journalists' phone numbers to check for potential leaks of information by its officers and staff. However, the report states that the practice was not "widespread or systemic"
- 26 September – A terrorism case against Liam Óg Ó hAnnaidh, a member of rap group Kneecap, is thrown out over a technical error in the way the charge against him was brought.
- 28 September – Firefighters are called after fire breaks out at Whiteabbey Hospital in County Antrim.

=== October ===
- 1 October – Belfast City Council votes in favour of adopting a new Irish language policy that will see greater use of it across Belfast.
- 3 October –
  - Storm Amy:
    - Several hundred schools across Northern Ireland are closed at midday, and a number of events cancelled, ahead of the arrival of Storm Amy.
    - Storm Amy causes damage to power lines, schools and vehicles with high winds and heavy rain as it makes landfall.
  - BBC Radio Ulster wins four gold awards at the 2025 Irish Music Rights Organisation Awards.
- 5 October –
  - Around 20,000 chickens are to be culled following the discovery of a suspected case of bird flu at a farm in County Tyrone.
  - Around 500 properties remain without power following Storm Amy.
- 7 October –
  - As part of the 2026 Irish budget, it is announced that daily flights between Derry and Dublin are to be restored from 2026; the route was withdrawn in 2011.
  - The Crown Prosecution Service says it will appeal against the Chief Magistrate's decision to throw out the case against Kneecap rapper Liam Og Ó hAnnaidh.
- 13 October –
  - The Northern Ireland Environmental Agency confirms the first sighting of an Asian hornet in Northern Ireland.
  - Stormont passes a new law aimed at addressing the price of school uniforms in Northern Ireland, with powers to cap prices and compel schools to explain the price rationale of school clothing.
- 14 October –
  - The Northern Ireland Troubles Bill, designed to replace the Northern Ireland Troubles (Legacy and Reconciliation) Act 2023, receives its first reading in the House of Commons.
  - Maryette McFarland graduates with a degree in English Literature from the Open University at the age of 90.
- 15 October – Further sightings of Asian hornets have been reported in Northern Ireland.
- 17 October –
  - The Met Office issues a warning for heavy rain in parts of Northern Ireland, valid for 18 and 19 October.
  - Three people are rescued from a flat fire in Armagh.
- 19 October – Two days of heavy rain causes severe flooding in Newcastle, County Down, described as the worst in four decades.
- 23 October –
  - A former Parachute Regiment soldier identified only as Soldier F is found not guilty of murder and attempted murder in Derry on Bloody Sunday.
  - Education minister Paul Givan says that girls have the legal authority to challenge their schools to let them wear trousers instead of skirts.
- 27 October – Justice minister Naomi Long announces plans for broadcasters to air some sentencing proceedings from Northern Ireland courts in order to "increase transparency" and "promote confidence" in the justice system.
- 28 October – Stormont appoints Pól Deeds and Lee Reynolds as the first Irish language and Ulster-Scots commissioners respectively.
- 29 October – A yellow weather warning for high winds is issued for the following day, forcing a number of Halloween events to either be cancelled or postponed.

=== November ===
- 1 November – Sinn Féin and the Social Democratic and Labour Party say they will support a motion of no confidence in Paul Givan, Stormont's Education Minister, after he took part in a six-day visit to Israel along with other unionist politicians.
- 4 November –
  - A TUV-proposed amendment to legislation that would have seen baby loss certificates issued to women who have abortions, and which was described as "callous and cruel" by Alliance MLA Kellie Armstrong, is defeated in a Stormont vote.
  - Translink announces a one-year pilot scheme to introduce night buses in Belfast on Fridays and Saturdays from the end of November in a bid to help boost the city's night time economy.
- 5 November – Charges against former SDLP leader Colum Eastwood in relation to his attendance at a pro-Palestine rally are dropped after he accepted a formal caution.
- 6 November – Health Minister Mike Nesbitt announces that the Stormont Executive has approved pay parity awards for doctors, nurses and auxiliary staff in line with colleagues in other parts of the UK.
- 7 November –
  - Deputy First Minister of Northern Ireland Emma Little-Pengelly turns down an invite to the inauguration of President of Ireland Catherine Connolly.
  - At a hearing at Antrim Crown Court, Anne Broughton is sentenced to eight months in prison suspended for one year for death by careless driving after causing the death of ex-Ireland international rugby player and former councillor David Tweed.
- 9 November – Cabotegravir, an injection to prevent HIV, is approved for use in Northern Ireland.
- 10 November – Education Minister Paul Givan survives a vote of no confidence after a motion proposed by People Before Profit fails to gain cross-party support.
- 12 November – The Rev Trevor Gribben steps down as the head of the Presbyterian Church in Ireland after "serious and significant failings" in safeguarding.
- 18 November – The Northern Ireland Troubles Bill receives its second reading in the House of Commons and passes by 320 votes to 105.
- 19 November –
  - The Supreme Court of the United Kingdom rules that Christian-based Religious Education lessons taught in primary schools in Northern Ireland are unlawful.
  - A man is charged in connection with the 2023 shooting of John Caldwell, a detective chief inspector with the Police Service of Northern Ireland.
- 20 November – COVID-19 in Northern Ireland: Publication of the second report from the UK COVID-19 Inquiry, which describes some meetings of Stormont's power-sharing executive as "deeply divided along political lines and beset by leaks", leading to an "incoherent approach" during the pandemic.
- 21 November – Responding to the COVID report, First Minister Michelle O'Neill says the Stormont Executive is now better prepared to deal with a pandemic.
- 23 November –
  - The Police Service of Northern Ireland confirm that a man and a woman were killed in a crash in County Antrim the previous day.
  - Finance Minister John O'Dowd says that Stormont faces a £400m overspend based on current financial commitments.
- 24 November – Mid and East Antrim Borough Council votes to change the name of Prince Andrew Way in Carrickfergus following the King's decision to strip Andrew Mountbatten-Windsor of his royal titles.
- 27 November –
  - Two men are arrested after four police officers were injured, including one who was stabbed and received serious injuries, in the early hours of the morning at a house in Derry. Both men are subsequently charged with attempted murder.
  - The Ulster Orchestra announces the appointment of Anna Handler as its next chief conductor, effective with the 2026–2027 season, with an initial contract of three years.
- 28 November – Two men are killed following a crash between a car and a bus near Enniskillen, County Fermanagh.
- 29 November – Data from Ofcom indicates 50% of adults in Northern Ireland use the BBC as their source of news, compared to 39% for the rest of the UK.
- 30 November – The Department of Agriculture, Environment and Rural Affairs confirms two suspected cases of blue tongue virus in cattle at an abattoir in Bangor, County Down, the first to be discovered on the island of Ireland.

=== December ===
- 1 December – Belfast City Council votes in favour of flying the Palestinian flag above City Hall.
- 2 December – The High Court rejects an emergency legal application by Traditional Unionist Voice to have the Palestinian flag taken down from Belfast City Hall.
- 3 December – There are now more than 40 suspected cases of blue tongue virus in Northern Ireland, all relating to the same herd in County Down where the virus was first identified.
- 5 December – The Court of Appeal rules that a woman sentenced to prison in 2021 for murdering her eight-week-old baby and attempting to murder her toddler daughter will have her conviction quashed. Although the woman admitted to the stabbings, she pleaded not guilty to the charges, but the conviction is ruled as unsafe.
- 6 December –
  - A new suspected case of bluetongue virus is discovered in a cow at a farm in Greyabbey, County Down.
  - BBC News reports that the Police Service of Northern Ireland is piloting the use of dashcams in some of its cars during December.
- 12 December – Solicitors and barristers are to fully withdraw from Crown Court cases in Northern Ireland as part of an ongoing dispute over legal aid fees.
- 13 December – A 27-year-old man and 58-year-old woman arrive in Northern Ireland having been extradited from Malta to face a number of charges.
- 14 December – BBC News reports that Sumo Na hÉireann in Belfast, which opened in 2024, has become the first sumo wrestling club on the island of Ireland.
- 15 December – Former Democratic Unionist Party councillor William Ball is sentenced to fifteen months in custody for historical sexual offences committed against a young girl.
- 18 December –
  - Restrictions on animal movements brought in because of bluetongue virus are to be eased.
  - An inquest into the 1971 death of Desmond Healey, a 14-year-old boy who was shot by a British soldier during rioting on the first day of internment, rules that excessive force was used and that his death was unlawful.
- 24 December – Two people are taken to hospital for treatment following a stabbing incident in Bangor, County Down.
- 28 December – Police investigating the stabbing of two women in Bangor locate a man's body.
- 30–31 December – Northern Ireland records its lowest overnight temperature of the winter, with a temperature of -7°C recorded in Katesbridge, County Down.
- 31 December – About 350 workers at NI Water stage a one-day strike in a dispute over pay arrangements and terms and conditions.

== Holidays ==
- 1 January – New Year's Day
- 17 March – Saint Patrick's Day
- 18 April – Good Friday
- 21 April – Easter Monday
- 5 May – Early May bank holiday
- 26 May – Spring May Bank Holiday
- 12 July – Orangemen's Day
- 4 August – Summer Bank Holiday
- 25 August – Summer Bank Holiday
- 25 December – Christmas Day
- 26 December – Saint Stephen's Day

== Deaths ==
- 10 January – Thelma Hopkins, 88, high jumper, Olympic silver medallist (1956).
- 22 January – Michael Longley, 85, poet (The Weather in Japan),
- 31 January – William Brown, 94, politician, MLA (1982–1986).
- 13 February – William Beattie, 82, politician.
- 21 February – Brendan McFarlane, 73, Irish republican activist.
- 17 March – Peter Farrelly, 76, Northern Irish musician (Fruupp). (death announced on this date)
- 18 April – Clodagh Rodgers, 78, Northern Irish singer ("Come Back and Shake Me", "Jack in the Box").
- 4 May – Peter McParland, 91, Northern Irish football player (Aston Villa, national team) and manager (Glentoran).
- 5 May – John Allen, chair of Belfast City Marathon
- 16 May – Andy Tyrie, 85, Northern Irish loyalist paramilitary leader, chairman of the Ulster Defence Association (1973–1988).
- 31 May – Sir Kenneth Bloomfield, 94, civil servant.
- 13 June – Seán Neeson, 79, Northern Irish politician, MLA (1982–1986, 1998–2011).
- 11 July – Billy Wilson, 88, Northern Irish footballer (Linfield). (death announced on this date)
- 17 July – Tommy Gallagher, 82, Northern Irish politician, MLA (1998–2011). (death announced on this date)
- 26 July – Willie Irvine, 82, Northern Irish footballer (Burnley, Preston North End, national team). (death announced on this date)
- 22 August – Martin Smyth, 94, Northern Irish politician, MLA (1982–1986) and MP (1982–2005). (death announced on this date)
- 8 September – Robin Glendinning, 87, Northern Irish playwright and politician.
- 4 October – Willie McFaul, 82, Northern Irish football player (Newcastle United, national team) and manager (Guam national team). (death announced on this date)
- 9 October – Jimmy Nicholson, 82, Northern Irish footballer (Manchester United, Huddersfield Town, national team).
- 12 October – John Graham, 58, Northern Irish-born Canadian racing driver, brain cancer.
- 13 November – Fabian Monds, 85, Northern Irish broadcasting executive, governor of BBC Northern Ireland.
- 30 December – Joe Byrne, 72, Northern Ireland politician, MLA (1998–2003, 2011–2015).
- 31 December – Mary Bradley, 83, Northern Irish politician, MLA (2003–2011). (death announced on this date)

== See also ==
- 2025 in England
- 2025 in Scotland
- 2025 in Wales
