= RAF Maghaberry =

Former Royal Air Force station in County Antrim, Northern Ireland

RAF Maghaberry No. 101 Storage Sub-Site
- Maghaberry, County Antrim in Northern Ireland
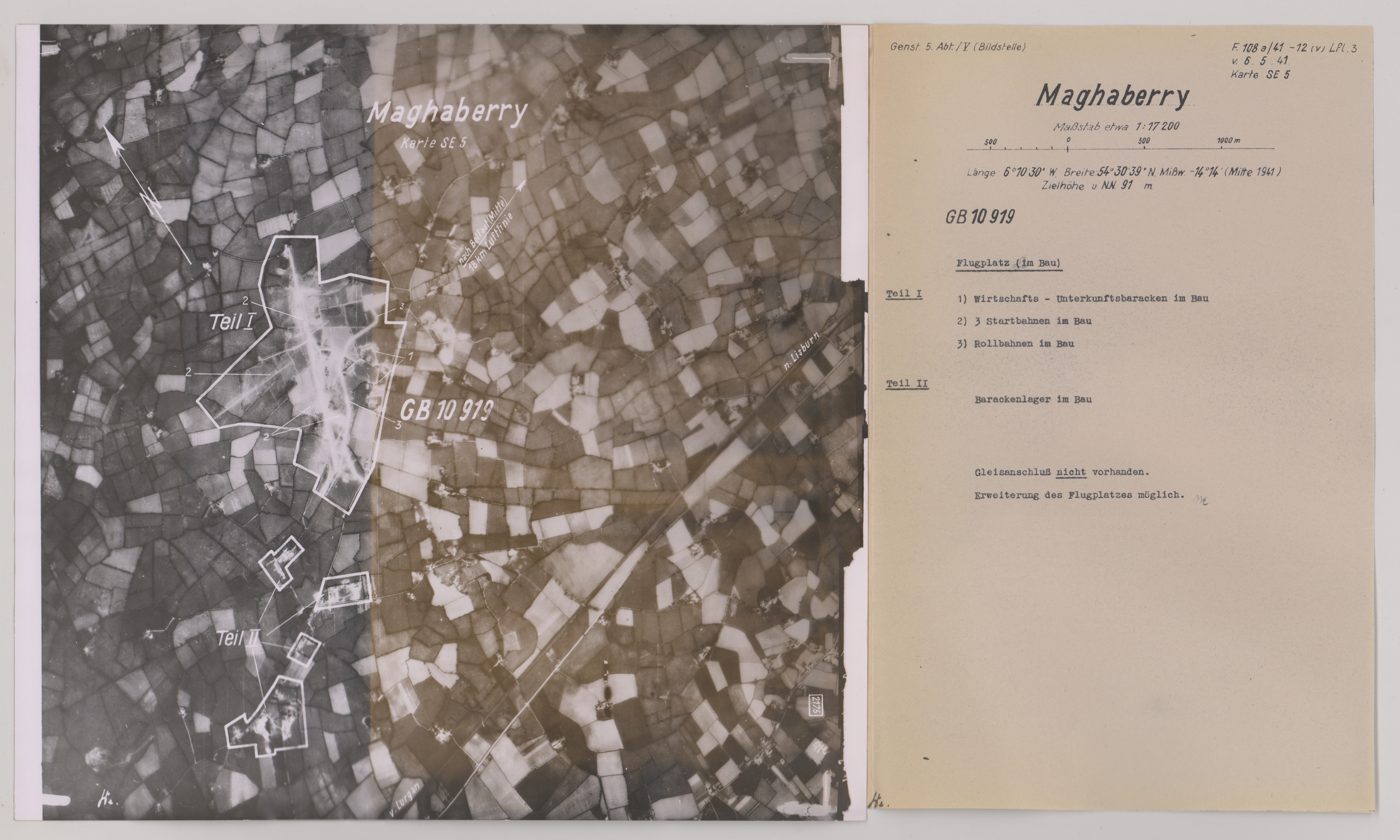
- RAF Maghaberry on a target dossier of the German Luftwaffe, 1941

Site information
- Type: Satellite Station
- Owner: Air Ministry
- Operator: Royal Air Force; United States Army Air Forces
- Controlled by: RAF Flying Training Command

Location
- Shown within Northern Ireland RAF Maghaberry (the United Kingdom)
- Coordinates: 54°30′56″N 6°10′49″W

Site history
- Built: 1940-41
- In use: 1941-1950
- Battles/wars: European theatre of World War II

Royal Air Force Maghaberry, or more simply RAF Maghaberry, is a former Royal Air Force satellite airfield located north of Maghaberry, County Antrim, Northern Ireland. The site of former RAF Maghaberry was transformed into HM Prison Maghaberry.

== History ==
The following units were here at some point:

- No. 5 (Coastal) Operational Training Unit RAF (OTU) (February - September 1943)
- Satellite Landing Ground for No. 23 Maintenance Unit RAF (January 1945 - October 1946)
- 'A' Flight of No. 104 (Transport) OTU RAF (September - October 1943)
- No. 231 Squadron RAF
- No. 306 Ferry Training Unit RAF (June - October 1943)
- No. 2775 Squadron RAF Regiment

USAAF

- 311th Ferry Squadron
- 312th Ferry Squadron
- 321st Air Transport Squadron
- 325th Ferry Squadron
