= Maghaberry =

Village in County Antrim, Northern Ireland

Coordinates: 54°30′18″N 6°11′25″W

Maghaberry: Irish: Maigh gCabraí
- Location within Northern Ireland
- Population: 4,716
- Irish grid reference: J175633
  - Belfast: 12 mi (19 km)
- District: Lisburn and Castlereagh
- County: County Antrim
- Country: Northern Ireland
- Sovereign state: United Kingdom
- Post town: CRAIGAVON
- Postcode district: BT67
- Dialling code: 028
- Police: Northern Ireland
- Fire: Northern Ireland
- Ambulance: Northern Ireland
- UK Parliament: Lagan Valley
- NI Assembly: Lagan Valley

Maghaberry or Magaberry (pronounced /məˈɡɑːbri/ mə-GAH-bree, from Irish Maigh gCabraí, meaning 'plain of poor land') is a village and townland in County Antrim, Northern Ireland. It is 9 kilometres (5.6 mi) west of Lisburn and 4 kilometres (2.5 mi) north of Moira. In the 2011 census it had a population of 4,716 people. It is one of the biggest villages within the Lisburn and Castlereagh City Council area.

== History ==
Until the early 20th century, Maghaberry was a rural townland with a crossroads, on the edge of a plateau. The economy of the area was mainly farming, although there were some limestone quarries. Today, the village serves as a commuter settlement, with its population mostly working and shopping elsewhere. It includes a community centre and Maghaberry Primary School. Maghaberry Methodist Church which is now a Covenant Church in partnership with the Church in Ireland. This new covenant arrangement amalgamates the two congregations into one. The new Covenant church is now known as the "Church on the Hill". There are also the Elim Tabernacle, a village hall and shops.

== Places of interest ==
HMP Maghaberry is a modern high security prison housing adult male long term sentenced and remand prisoners, in both separated and integrated conditions. There are 939 staff and room for 718 prisoners in single cell accommodation.

== Demographics ==
As of the 2011 census, there were 4,716 people living in Maghaberry in 1,656 households. Of these:

- 23.2% were aged under 16 years and 11.22% were aged 60 and over.
- 50.59% of the population were male and 49.41% were female.
- 11.05% were from a Catholic background and 80.96% were from a Protestant or any other Christian background.
- 74.81% indicated they had a British national identity, 7.4% had an Irish national identity and 33.18% had a Northern Irish national identity. (Note: Respondents could indicate more than one national identity)
- 2.22% of people aged 16–74 were unemployed.
