= 2027 in Ireland =

- Centuries: 19th; 20th; 21st
- Decades: 2000s; 2010s; 2020s
- See also: 2027 in Northern Ireland; Other events of 2027; List of years in Ireland

Events during the year 2027 in Ireland.

== Events ==
=== Predicted and scheduled ===
- 9 May – The national population will be counted during Census 2027.
- End of 2027 – The cross-border Narrow Water Bridge, connecting Omeath, County Louth, with Narrow Water near Warrenpoint, County Down is expected to be completed.

== Sport ==
=== Golf ===
- 17–19 September – 2027 Ryder Cup.

== Annual events ==
(H) = public holiday

=== January ===
- 1 January – New Year's Day. (H)
- 6 January – Nollaig na mBan.

=== February ===
- 1 February – Imbolc.
- 1 February – Saint Brigid's holiday. (H)

=== March ===
- 17 March – Saint Patrick's Day. (H)
- 20 March – Spring equinox.
- 29 March – Easter Monday. (H)

=== May ===
- 1 May – Bealtaine.
- 3 May – May holiday. (H)

=== June ===
- June – Pride Month.
- 7 June – June holiday. (H)
- 16 June – Bloomsday.
- 21 June – Summer solstice.

=== August ===
- 1 August – Lúnasa.
- 3 August – August holiday. (H)

=== September ===
- 23 September – Autumn equinox.

=== October ===
- 25 October – October holiday. (H)
- 31 October – Hallowe'en.

=== November ===
- 1 November – Samhain.

=== December ===
- 21 December – Winter solstice.
- 25 December – Christmas Day. (H)
- 26 December – Saint Stephen's Day, also Lá an Dreoilín. (H)
