= Murder of Natalie McNally =

2022 murder of Northern Irish woman

- McNally in 2022
- Date: 18 December 2022
- Location: Lurgan, Northern Ireland
- Perpetrator: Stephen McCullagh
- Deaths: Natalie McNally (aged 32 years)
- Trial: Yes
- Verdict: Guilty
- Convictions: Murder
- Sentence: Life: minimum of 31 years to be served

On 18 December 2022, Natalie McNally, a 32‑year‑old woman from Northern Ireland, was stabbed to death in her home in Lurgan, County Armagh. Her boyfriend, Stephen McCullagh, who initially claimed to have been live‑streaming on his YouTube channel at the time of the killing, was convicted of her murder in March 2026 and later sentenced to life with a minimum of 31 years in prison. The circumstances of the attack generated widespread public concern across Northern Ireland.

== Background ==
In August 2022, Natalie McNally first made contact with Stephen McCullagh via Bumble, and they soon began a romantic relationship. In November 2022, McNally revealed to her family that she was pregnant with McCullagh's child.

On the night of 19 December 2022, officers from the Police Service of Northern Ireland were called to a house at Silverwood Green in Lurgan at around 10 pm, where they discovered the body of 32-year-old Natalie McNally. A post‑mortem examination later found that, in addition to multiple stab wounds, McNally – who was 15 weeks pregnant at the time – had been severely beaten and had sustained several facial fractures and broken bones in her neck. Detectives found no signs of forced entry at the property, suggesting that McNally knew her killer and had allowed them into her home. A 32‑year‑old man was arrested at the scene, but he was released the following day after being ruled out as a suspect.

== Murder investigation ==
Detectives investigating McNally's death established that she had watched the 2022 FIFA World Cup final with her parents in Craigavon before returning to her home in Lurgan sometime after 5 pm. After reviewing local CCTV recordings, police released footage of a person seen acting suspiciously near her home on the day she was last seen alive. The footage showed a man carrying a rucksack, whom detectives believed to be the killer, entering Silverwood Green at 8:52 pm on 18 December 2022 and leaving again at 9:30 pm. On 31 January 2023, the PSNI announced that they had re‑arrested the man initially detained on suspicion of McNally's murder.

On 2 February 2023, 32‑year‑old Stephen McCullagh, from Woodland Gardens in Lisburn, was charged at Lisburn Magistrates' Court with McNally's murder. The court heard that McCullagh had been arrested soon after her death but was ruled out as a suspect because he appeared to have an alibi in the form of a six‑hour live‑stream of him playing Grand Theft Auto: Vice City on his YouTube channel on the night in question. Subsequent forensic examination of his digital devices determined that the "live‑stream" had been pre‑recorded and broadcast as if it were live. Detectives noted that McCullagh stated at the start of the video that he could not engage in live chat with his 37,000 subscribers, due to "technical issues", and that he repeatedly referenced the purported current time throughout the recording, which investigators believed was an attempt to reinforce the timeline of his alibi.

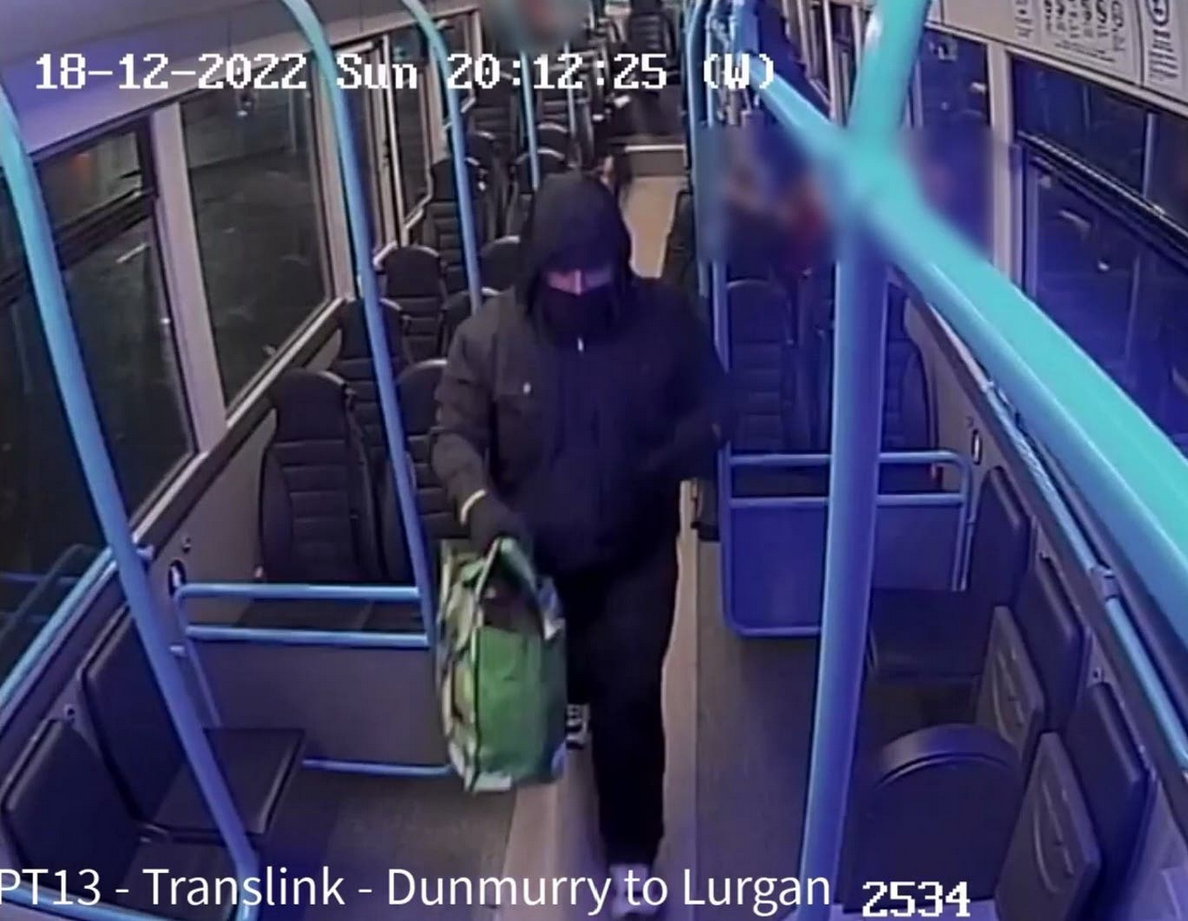
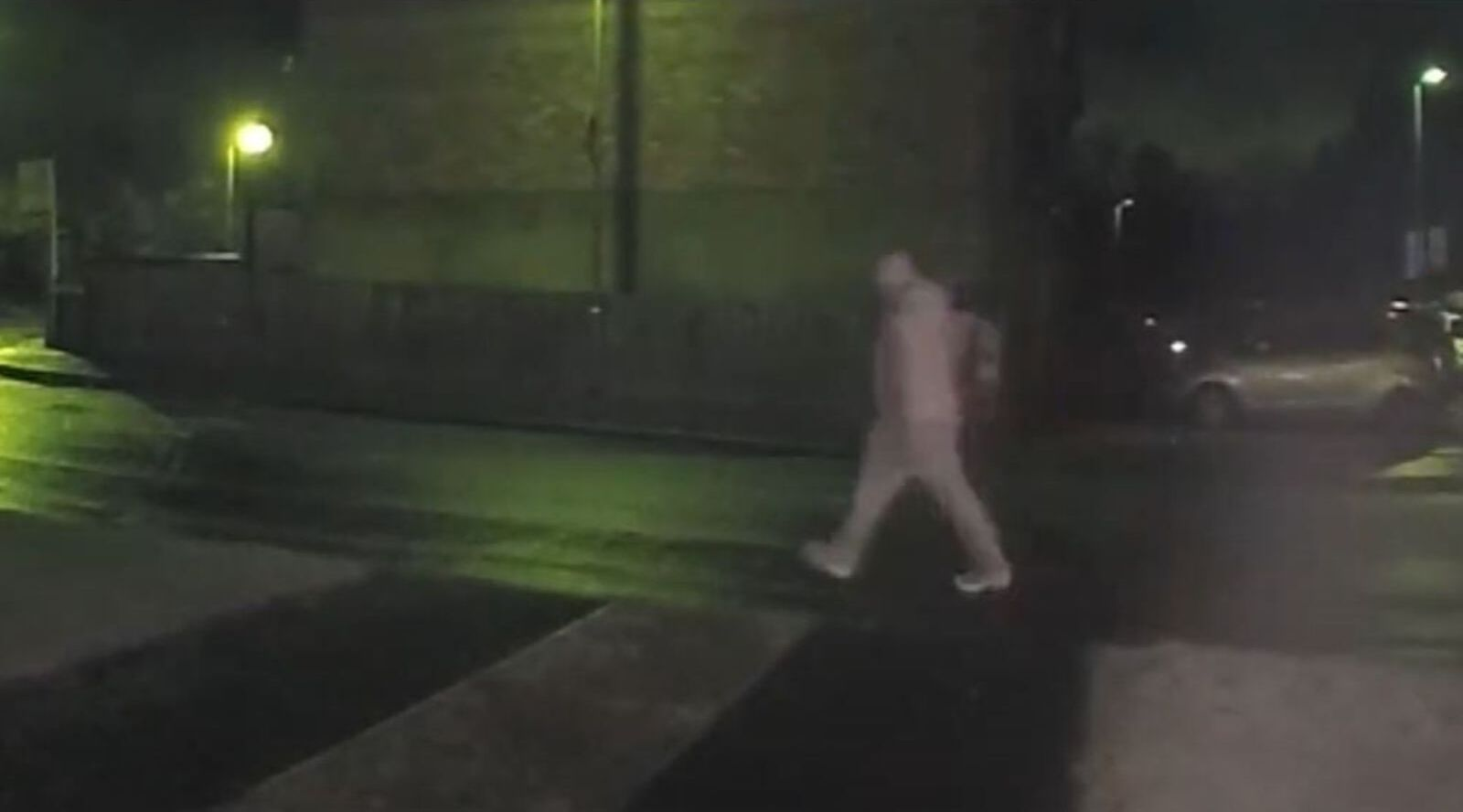
The suspect seen on a bus and leaving the development where Natalie McNally lived

PSNI Detective Chief Inspector Neil McGuinness told the court that McCullagh admitted during interviews that the video had been recorded around 14 December 2022. McGuinness also stated that, after being ruled out as a suspect, McCullagh declined to co‑operate with aspects of the investigation, including providing a statement describing the scene when he arrived at the property before paramedics entered. He further told the court that CCTV evidence, witness statements from a taxi driver and the inactivity of McCullagh's mobile phone between 6 pm and 11:16 pm on the night of McNally's death linked him to the killing. District Judge Watters refused bail and remanded McCullagh in custody to await trial.

== Pre-trial legal proceedings ==
During a court hearing on 17 February 2023, McCullagh's defence team argued that the murder charge against him centred on an inconsistency relating to the live‑streaming of a video game. Defence lawyers stated that McCullagh, who denied murdering McNally, accepted that the video on his YouTube channel had been pre‑recorded but maintained that he had been drinking at home on the day in question and had fallen asleep around the time of the killing.

On 6 March 2023, during a bail application at the Belfast High Court, prosecution barrister Natalie Pinkerton urged the court to refuse bail, asserting that a "strong and persuasive" prima facie case had been established and that McCullagh had demonstrated significant premeditation and deceit by constructing an elaborate hoax of live‑streaming an Xbox gaming session to create an alibi. Pinkerton told the court that CCTV footage from a bus in Dunmurry showed a masked individual matching McCullagh's physical description travelling to Lurgan, where at around 9 pm two of McNally's neighbours heard her screaming. Shortly afterwards, a taxi driver picked up a fare outside Fa Joe's Bar on Carnegie Street and drove him to McCullagh's home in Lisburn; the driver later identified the man as McCullagh during a police lineup.

The court also heard that McCullagh went to McNally's house the following day, alerted police to her death and suggested to officers that an ex‑partner had been harassing her in the preceding weeks. Pinkerton further noted that, during the gaming session, McCullagh had deliberately selected an optional side mission titled "Waste the Wife", in which the player must kill a woman and stage the death as an accident. The prosecution argued that this was intended as an "Easter egg" to taunt McNally's family. Defence lawyers maintained that the case against their client was entirely circumstantial and that the timing of the mission relative to McNally's estimated time of death was a tragic coincidence. Justice Siobhán Keegan refused bail.

On 12 January 2024, McCullagh formally entered a plea of not guilty to the murder of McNally. On 20 September 2024, he was again denied bail, with Justice O'Hara citing the risk of interference with witnesses as a reason for his continued remand in HMP Maghaberry. On 3 November 2025, McCullagh's defence barrister, John Kearney, successfully sought an adjournment to the murder trial after hundreds of new documents were disclosed during pre‑trial evidence review. Justice O'Hara granted the adjournment after hearing that up to 30,000 pages of additional material might ultimately be transferred to the defence.

== Trial of McCullagh ==
On 16 February 2026, a jury of six men and six women were sworn in before Mr Justice Patrick Kinney at Belfast Crown Court for the trial of McCullagh on a charge of murdering McNally. Addressing the issue of previous media coverage, judge Kinney instructed the jurors that they must decide the case solely on the evidence presented in court and warned them not to conduct any independent research. He also advised that the proceedings were expected to last for around five weeks. The Public Prosecution Service would later describe the case as unprecedented in Northern Irish legal history due to "the premeditation, the levels of deception and concealment, and really the extraordinary amount of planning to kill this young woman".

=== Opening statements ===
On 23 February, prosecuting barrister Charles MacCreanor KC told the jury that McCullagh had made a 999 call from McNally's house in Lurgan at around 10 pm on Monday 19 December 2022, a recording of which was played in court. Police and paramedics arriving at the scene found McNally lying in a pool of blood while a visibly distressed McCullagh was attempting CPR. McNally had three stab wounds to her neck and further lacerations to the top of her head, while subsequent examination found that manual compression of the neck had also contributed to her death. According to the prosecution, McNally was 15 weeks pregnant at the time and McCullagh was the father of her unborn child. The estimated time of death was between 8:50 pm and 9:30 pm on Sunday 18 December. The prosecution asserted that the killing was "planned, calculated and pre‑meditated", that McCullagh was the sole perpetrator and that he had "put on an act" afterwards to conceal his involvement.

Although McCullagh told the PSNI that he had been live‑streaming for six hours on his YouTube channel on the night in question, technical experts later determined that the footage was pre‑recorded. The Crown contended that he had travelled from his home in Lisburn to Lurgan by public transport and had changed his clothing and appearance during the journey to avoid detection. After his re‑arrest, McCullagh admitted that the video had been pre‑recorded and broadcast on YouTube on 18 December, but claimed that he had consumed a large amount of alcohol before falling asleep at home. When asked about a taxi arriving at his house that night, he asserted that what he described as "the true killer of Natalie" had deliberately created a trail of circumstantial evidence to frame him for her murder.

=== Prosecution evidence ===
Paramedic Graham Thompson testified that he was first on the scene and observed that McNally's hands and lips had turned blue. PSNI Constable Archibald told the court that she detected a foul odour in the house on arrival, while PSNI Constable Feeley stated that he recovered a knife a few feet from McNally's body in the living room, where blood was present on the floor and the walls. McCullagh was arrested at the scene on suspicion of murder, but he told officers that he had been livestreaming throughout the previous evening and was later released from custody because he appeared to have an alibi. State pathologist Dr James Lyness testified that he conducted the post‑mortem examination, documenting dozens of injuries to McNally's upper body, including stab wounds, strangulation injuries, lacerations, and bruises. Although Dr Lyness could not identify a single definitive cause of death, he stated that either the stab wounds or the neck‑compression injuries could have been fatal on their own and that McNally had endured a "prolonged assault".

Screenshot of the "live-stream" video Stephen McCullagh used as an alibi

The prosecution also read WhatsApp messages exchanged between McNally and McCullagh, including a message at 5:57 pm on the day in question in which McCullagh said he was about to begin livestreaming on YouTube. The jury were reminded that McCullagh initially relied on the purported "live‑stream" as an alibi, but later admitted it was pre‑recorded after the PSNI's cyber‑forensics team established that it had not been broadcast live. Sections of the video, titled "The Violent Night Christmas Live Gaming Stream", were then played to the jury, during which McCullagh repeatedly referred to technical issues preventing him from engaging in live chat. The prosecutor told the jury that the faked live‑stream, which appeared on McCullagh's YouTube channel between 6 pm and midnight on the night McNally was murdered, was "a cover story" created by the accused.

Detective Constable Matthews of the PSNI's cyber‑crime unit told the court that material recovered from McCullagh's computer demonstrated that the video broadcast on 18 December had not been streamed live. He said the OBS Studio software showed no background activity during pauses in the programme, which would not have been possible during a genuine live transmission. According to his evidence, a single six‑hour recording had been created on 14 December, saved in the early hours of 15 December, and then manually deleted shortly after midnight on 19 December. He added that digital-forensics analysis showed no user interaction with the computer at any point between 6 pm on 18 December and 12:05 am on 19 December, further indicating that the broadcast could not have been produced in real time.

1 Silverwood Green, Lurgan
2 Woodland Gardens, Lisburn

A compilation of CCTV clips were played to the jury, comprising footage from domestic security cameras and a Translink bus. In the material, a person of interest was observed travelling by bus from Dunmurry to Lurgan, before continuing on foot to Silverwood Green. Shortly after 9:30 pm, the same individual, now wearing different clothing, was recorded leaving the Silverwood area and entering a taxi in Lurgan town centre, which then proceeded to McCullagh's house at Woodland Gardens in Lisburn. Images taken from McCullagh's Instagram account were also shown to the jury. They depicted him wearing a beanie hat with a black curly wig underneath: the prosecutor argued that the person of interest captured on CCTV entering the taxi in Lurgan was wearing the same style of hat.

The court heard how McCullagh was formally interrogated by police with his solicitor present the day after McNally's body was discovered. His solicitor indicated that he was keen to co-operate as a witness but contended that McCullagh was being treated as a suspect despite it not being proven yet that an actual murder had been committed and there was no evidence linking his client to the alleged incident; therefore, he directed McCullagh to reply "no comment" on more than 80 occasions when questioned about specifics such as his movements and his own relationship with McNally. However, McCullagh did allege to police that McNally's former partner had been harassing her recently and the accused denied any involvement in her death when the allegation was directly put to him.

McNally's parents took the stand to testify about McCullagh's behaviour after her body was discovered, describing him as being distraught with grief and showing them an engagement ring he had purchased for their daughter. In regards to his non co-operation with police investigating her death, McNally's father Noel told the court that McCullagh said his own solicitor instructed him not to speak to them after he had initially been treated as a suspect. McNally's mother Bernadette also testified that McCullagh had implied an ex-boyfriend had been harassing Natalie in the run-up to her death.

McNally's next-door neighbours Emils Sosins and Aisling Henry separately described to the jury how they heard screaming from her flat at around 9 pm on the night in question, with Henry adding that she saw a large shadow on the property's patio blinds. Anne McCullough, who was an old college friend of McCullagh, narrated to the court how he was inconsolable with grief in the aftermath of McNally's death, adding that she thought they made a good couple and that McCullagh was excited about becoming a father. The court also heard evidence from an ex-girlfriend of McCullagh's, who alleged that he was physically abusive to her on several occasions during their seven-year-on-off relationship. The woman also revealed that after she had given birth to a stillborn baby in early 2022 she received private counselling sessions at McCullagh's house; the PSNI later informed her that he had recorded some of these sessions without her knowledge. Taxi driver Jeff McAvoy testified that on the night of McNally's murder he picked up a male passenger outside a pub in Lurgan town centre at 10:46 pm, who then directed him to a house in Lisburn. Technical examination of the taxi's GPS logs revealed that it stopped outside McCullagh's house on Woodland Gardens at 11:11 pm on the night in question.

McNally's ex-boyfriend, who McCullagh had accused of being responsible for her murder, testified to the jury how they first met on Tinder in 2019 and had an on/off relationship over the next few years, with a final sexual encounter occurring at her house in October 2022. The man revealed that he had been arrested by police investigating McNally's death and that on the night in question he was watching the World Cup final with his partner at their house. Under cross-examination by defence barrister John Kearney KC, the man admitted he had been recently arrested for threatening violence towards a former girlfriend via WhatsApp messaging, however he dismissed this as "a load of slabbering". Kearney KC also put it to the man that he had deliberately and repeatedly lied to detectives investigating McNally's death, asserting that this was to prevent the police from making him the prime suspect in her murder. The man admitted being untruthful in his statements to the PSNI, but claimed it was because he had sent her some abusive emails in 2022, while reiterating that he had nothing to do with her death. When asked why he had erased all data on his phone via factory reset in the days after McNally's body was discovered, the man explained that the PSNI had just arrived at his house and he had a bag of cannabis hidden in a cupboard, so to pre-empt its possible discovery he wanted to quickly wipe his phone of any incriminating messages regarding recreational drugs. The court also heard testimony from the man's then girlfriend, who described both of them watching the 2022 FIFA World Cup final in their house on the night of McNally's death, and a short video was played to the court of them lying on a couch with the football match broadcasting on the television.

Transcripts of messages sent from McNally to several other men in the months before her death were submitted into evidence, with some implying she was thinking about ending her relationship with McCullagh. The jury was also shown video recordings of police interviews with McCullagh in early 2023, during which he was shown CCTV footage of a person of interest and GPS evidence of a taxi arriving outside his house on the night in question. When detectives remarked that the individual in the CCTV is the person who murdered McNally and everything from police inquiries indicated that he was the person in the CCTV footage, McCullagh replied "no comment". He later provided a prepared statement asserting that the case against him was entirely based on circumstantial evidence, that he was not the person in the CCTV footage and that someone else was trying to frame him for McNally's death.

=== Defence submissions ===
When offered the opportunity to take the stand in his own defence, McCullagh exercised his right to silence and declined to give evidence or be cross-examined by the prosecution. Defence barrister John Kearney KC also informed the trial judge that he would not be calling any witnesses to give evidence or making any submissions on his client's behalf.

=== Closing statements ===
The prosecutor asserted to the jury that McCullagh had lied repeatedly to many different people regarding the circumstances surrounding McNally's death. He emphasised the faked livestream of McCullagh playing Grand Theft Auto on the night in question and how McCullagh consistently used it as a "false alibi" until confronted with a PSNI cyber-expert report proving it was pre-recorded. The prosecutor also highlighted McCullagh's refusal to testify in his own defence, which he argued was because nothing McCullagh could say would withstand scrutiny under cross‑examination, adding that if McCullagh had an innocent explanation to counter what he described as a strong and compelling case, it would have been heard during the trial.

Defence barrister John Kearney KC countered that the case against his client was based on circumstantial evidence, multiple parts of which, he argued, pointed away from McCullagh and towards another person. Kearney KC told the jury that if they had any reasonable doubt that someone else had murdered McNally, they must acquit McCullagh.

In his charge to the jury, judge Kinney said that although a significant amount of evidence had been discussed regarding McNally's former partner, he was not the person on trial and that the jury's task was solely to determine whether McCullagh was guilty of murder. Noting that there was no direct evidence and that the prosecution's case was entirely circumstantial, the judge instructed the jury to examine each strand individually and then consider whether the strands they accepted, taken together, proved the prosecution's case. If so, he said, they must return a verdict of guilty.

=== Verdict ===
On 23 March 2026, McCullagh was unanimously found guilty of the murder of McNally after two hours of jury deliberations. While relatives of McNally cheered from the public gallery, McCullagh showed little emotion as the verdict was delivered. Judge Kinney told McCullagh that he would receive a mandatory life sentence and that his minimum tariff would be set at an upcoming hearing. It was later reported that McCullagh was being held in the hospital wing of Maghaberry Prison over safety concerns he could be targeted in a revenge attack.

Despite having remained publicly accessible throughout the trial, McCullagh's YouTube channels were terminated a few hours after the verdict was announced, with a YouTube spokesperson later stating that they had been removed "for violating our creator responsibility policies".

=== Sentencing ===
During a sentencing hearing on 21 May 2026, it was revealed that after being found guilty McCullagh told a probation officer he could have been responsible for her death but he "had no memory" of the night McNally was murdered. Prosecution lawyer Charles MacCreanor KC highlighted what he termed as McCullagh's contradictory contributions to a pre-sentence report as an attempt to manipulate the parole board, and asked for a prison sentence of between 27 to 35 years. Defence barrister John Kearney KC countered that the proposed sentence would be excessive, and questioned the amount of premeditation allegedly displayed by McCullagh in the run-up to McNally's murder. Kearney KC also argued that a 15 to 16 years minimum sentence would be more appropriate. The judge thereafter adjourned proceedings to a further hearing.

On 3 June 2026 at Belfast Crown Court, McCullagh was sentenced to life in prison with a minimum term of 31 years for McNally's murder. Judge Patrick Kinney remarked that McCullagh had shown high culpability by creating an alibi of "live-streaming" on his YouTube channel, adding that he knew she was pregnant at the time and that his "brutal and frenzied attack" would also result in the death of her unborn baby (who was to be named "Dean"). McCullagh remained expressionless as the sentence was handed down. After he was sentenced, the PSNI released audio of McCullagh's call to emergency services on the night of the murder, along with CCTV footage of him travelling to and from Lurgan in disguise and recordings of his "no comment" police interviews after his re-arrest.

=== Appeal ===
On 30 June 2026, lawyers acting for McCullagh lodged an appeal against his sentence.

== McCullagh's post-conviction legal issues ==
On 18 September 2026, McCullagh was charged with 19 criminal offences, including voyeurism along with making and possessing indecent photographs between 2007 and 2023. Belfast Crown Court heard that McCullagh was accused of covertly recording 12 women while doing a private act for the "purpose of obtaining sexual gratification". McCullagh entered a not guilty plea on all charges and was scheduled to stand trial on 30 November 2026.
