= Collarette =

Collarette can refer to:

- A small collar
- Collarette (iris), a part of the eye
