= 2027 in England =

- Centuries: 19th; 20th; 21st
- Decades: 2000s; 2010s; 2020s
- See also: 2026–27 in English football 2027 in the United Kingdom; Other events of 2027

Events of the year 2027 in England.

== Events ==
=== Predicted and scheduled ===
- 17 April–3 May – 2027 World Snooker Championship
- 6 May – 2027 Cumbria mayoral election
- 28 July – 8 August – 2027 Men's EuroHockey Championship and 2027 Women's EuroHockey Championship

== Holidays ==
- 1 January – New Year's Day
- 26 March – Good Friday
- 29 March – Easter Monday
- 3 May – Early May bank holiday
- 31 May – Spring May Bank Holiday
- 30 August – Summer Bank Holiday
- 25 December – Christmas Day
- 26 December – Boxing Day
