= Paul McCullagh Jr. =

Northern Irish boxer (2000–2026)

Paul McCullagh Jr. (2000 – 1 January 2026), nicknamed The Irish Drago, was a Northern Irish boxer.

== Life and career ==
Paul McCullagh Jr. was born in Belfast in 2000, to Paul McCullagh Sr. His grandfather, also named Paul, was a championship trainer. He made his professional debut in 2020, after becoming the 2019 Ulster Elite champion.

McCullagh died in hospital from bone cancer, on 1 January 2026, at the age of 25.
