= HM Prison Maghaberry =

Prison in Lisburn, Northern Ireland

Coordinates: 54.514°N 6.186°W

HMP Maghaberry
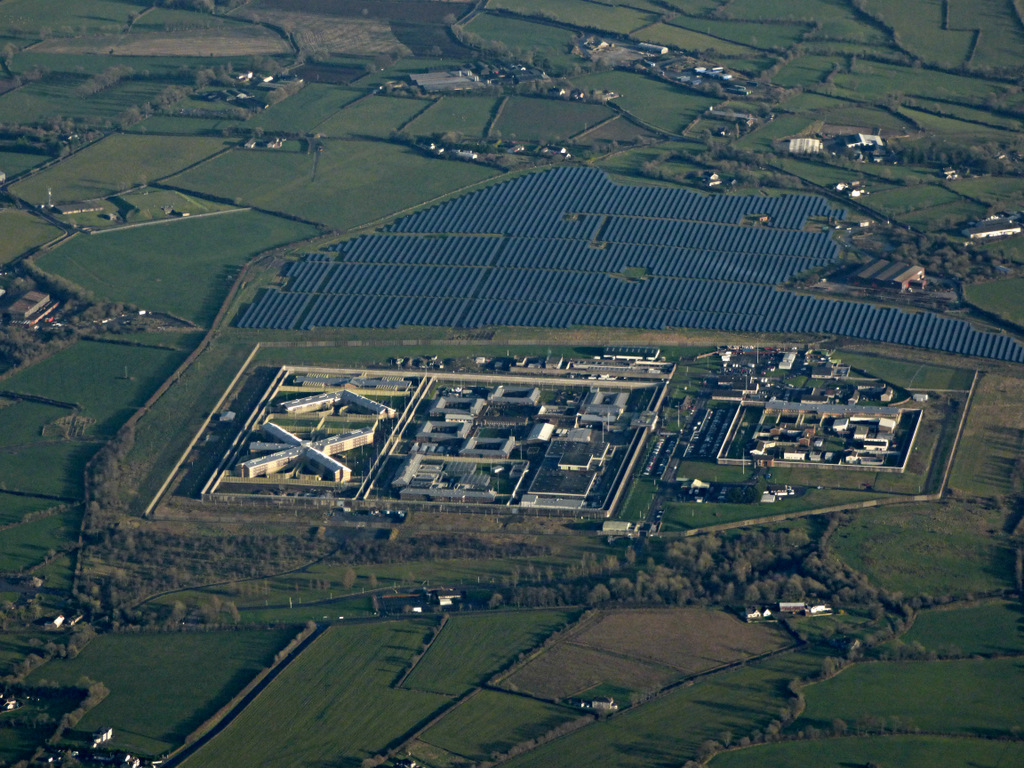
- Interactive map of HMP Maghaberry
- Location: Lisburn, Northern Ireland
- Status: Operational
- Security class: High Security
- Capacity: 970
- Opened: 1986
- Managed by: Northern Ireland Prison Service
- Governor: Tracy Megrath

HM Prison Maghaberry is a high security prison near Lisburn in the south-west of County Antrim in Northern Ireland which opened in 1986. It was built on the site of RAF Maghaberry, a World War II airfield used as a flying station by the Royal Air Force and a transit airfield for the United States Army Air Forces. At the end of the war, the airfield was run down and was bought back from the Air Ministry in 1957 by Edward Thomas Boyes who then farmed it with his sons until the Northern Ireland Office (NIO) began work on the prison in 1976.

Mourne House, which held female prisoners, young offenders, and remands, was the first part to be opened, in March 1986. This followed the closure of the women's prison at HMP Armagh. The male part of the prison became fully operational on 2 November 1987. Following the closure of HMP Belfast on 31 March 1996, Maghaberry became the adult committal prison in Northern Ireland. Two new accommodation blocks were opened in 1999.

In 2003, the Steele report recommended options to make Maghaberry safe, including "a degree of separation" for Irish republican and Ulster loyalist inmates.

Maghaberry is currently a high-security prison housing both adult male long-term sentenced and remand prisoners in both separated and integrated conditions. The prison holds 970 prisoners in a mix of single and double cell accommodation.

In February 2016, a prison inspection report by the Northern Ireland Department of Justice condemned HMP Maghaberry as unsafe and unstable and lacking a correct insurance policy due to an ongoing dispute over land ownership, citing suicides and clashes between inmates and prison staff. Nick Hardwick, His Majesty's Chief Inspector of Prisons in England and Wales, described the prison as "one of the worst prisons I've ever seen and the most dangerous prison I've been to".

Maghaberry Prison remains arguably the most complex prison in the United Kingdom, and is unique in accommodating both remand prisoners, and sentenced prisoners of all categories. It also simultaneously accommodates a separated regime for Loyalist and Republican paramilitary prisoners. It was described in 2002 by Her Majesty's Chief Inspector of Prisons as "the most complex and diverse prison establishment in the UK". In the same year the Northern Ireland Association for the Care and Resettlement of Offenders (NIACRO) reported that they did "not know of any other prison regime in either Great Britain or the Republic of Ireland or, if you like, in Europe, that has those sorts of pressures existing in one site".

== Notable prisoners ==
- Robert Black
- Colin Howell
- Stephen McCullagh
- Maurice Robinson: man involved in Essex Lorry Deaths
- Michael Stone
- Jeffrey Donaldson
