= 2027 in the United Kingdom =

Events from the year 2027 in the United Kingdom.

== Events ==
=== Predicted and scheduled ===
- 31 January – The UK's copper wire landline telephone system will be switched off permanently, requiring the use of an alternative internet-based platform.
- 7 March – Train operator Avanti West Coast will be taken into public ownership.
- 17 April–3 May – 2027 World Snooker Championship
- 6 May – 2027 United Kingdom local elections
- 28 July – 8 August – 2027 Men's EuroHockey Championship and 2027 Women's EuroHockey Championship

== See also ==
- Politics of the United Kingdom
- 2020s in United Kingdom political history
- 2027 deaths in the United Kingdom
- 2027 United Kingdom electoral calendar
- 2027 in United Kingdom politics and government
- 2027 in British music
- 2027 in British television
- 2027 in British radio
- List of British films of 2027
