= August Bank Holiday =

Public holiday in the United Kingdom

- Status: Currently observed
- Dates: Last Monday of August (England, Wales, Northern Ireland); First Monday of August (Scotland)
- Frequency: Annual
- Country: United Kingdom
- Inaugurated: 1871

The August Bank Holiday or Summer Bank Holiday is a public holiday in the United Kingdom, part of the statutory bank holiday provision. Originally, the holiday was held on the first Monday of August across the country, but was changed in the late 1960s to the last Monday in August for England, Wales and Northern Ireland. It remains the first Monday for Scotland.

== Creation ==
The holiday was one of four created by the Bank Holidays Act 1871 (along with Easter Monday, Whit Monday and Boxing Day), being the only one which was not linked to an Anglican religious festival. The act was introduced by Liberal politician Sir John Lubbock.

Lubbock argued that the act was passed with relative ease because of the naming as a 'bank' holiday, with those who might have opposed it thinking it only applied to banks.

== Move to end of August ==
In 1964, an experimental move to the end of August was announced by the Secretary of State for Industry, Trade and Regional Development, Edward Heath, taking effect for two years from 1965, responding to pressure from the holiday industry to extend the season. The move applied to England and Wales, but not to Scotland.

There was consultation on other methods of staggering holidays and reducing congestion related to this. Other suggestions included staggering school holidays by region, and introducing a four-term school year.

Following the two year trial, each year's date was announced in Parliament on an ad hoc basis, causing problems for publishers of the calendars and diaries. The rule seems to have been to select the weekend of the last Saturday in August, so that in 1968 and 1969 Bank Holiday Monday actually fell in September, causing concern amongst some politicians.

The date was settled in statute with the passage of the Banking and Financial Dealings Act 1971, which remains in force today, with the date specified as "the last Monday in August".

== Proposed changes ==
In 2014, a Private member's bill was introduced by Conservative MP Peter Bone to rename the holiday as Margaret Thatcher day, in honour of the late Prime Minister, but the bill failed to progress past the first reading.
