= 2022 in Northern Ireland =

- Centuries: 20th; 21st
- Decades: 2000s; 2010s; 2020s
- See also: 2022 in the United Kingdom; 2022 in Ireland; Other events of 2022; List of years in Northern Ireland

Events from the year 2022 in Northern Ireland.

== Incumbents ==
- First Minister of Northern Ireland
  - Paul Givan (until 4 February)
  - Vacant (since 4 February)
- deputy First Minister of Northern Ireland
  - Michelle O'Neill (until 4 February)
  - Vacant (since 4 February)
- Secretary of State for Northern Ireland
  - Brandon Lewis (until 7 July)
  - Shailesh Vara (7 July – 6 September)
  - Chris Heaton-Harris (from 6 September)

== Events ==
=== January ===
- 3 January – 28 year-old tattoo artist Aidan Mann is stabbed and killed in Downpatrick.
- 5 January – During a virtual meeting, members of Stormont engage in a verbal dispute due to TUV leader Jim Allister displaying an Ulster Defense Regiment book during the conference.
- 6 January – First Minister Paul Givan says no further COVID restrictions are needed in Northern Ireland despite a surge in Omicron variant cases.
- 14 January – The Europa Hotel in Belfast is briefly evacuated due to a fire on the eleventh floor, believed to have been started accidentally.
- 17 January – Lady Chief Justice Siobhan Keegan announces that she will be forwarding a verdict to the Director of Public Prosecutions related to the Ballymurphy Massacre. The verdict could compel additional soldiers to come forward and provide first hand accounts.
- 25 January – Doug Beattie, the leader of the Ulster Unionist Party comes under fire after historical controversial tweets are discovered on his account.
- 27 January – The Democratic Unionist Party announce that they will halt customs checks put in place following Brexit following failure to secure a vote on said issue.
- 30 January – Thousands march in Derry on the 50th anniversary of Bloody Sunday.
- 31 January – A public consultation is launched relating to a proposed hate crime bill that would include misogyny, sectarian attacks and transmisogyny.

=== February ===
- 1 February – At Stormont, MLAs vote to set a target date for Northern Ireland to reach net-zero emissions by 2050.
- 4 February – First Minister Paul Givan resigns as leader of the Democratic Unionist Party over disagreements regarding the Northern Ireland Protocol. Sinn Féin call for an early election as a result. Due to the power sharing agreement, Michelle O'Neill is also forced to resign as deputy.
- 4 February – The High Court orders ports to resume checks related to the Northern Ireland Protocol that had been halted by Edwin Poots days prior.
- 6 February – Platinum Jubilee of Elizabeth II marking 70 years since the Queen succeeded to the throne of the U.K. on the death of her father George VI on the 6 February 1952. Public celebrations will be held in June.
- 12 February – Barry's Amusements at Portrush is acquired by the County Galway-based Curry family. The family runs the Curry's Fun Park in Salthill.
- 14 February – Health Minister Robin Swann announces that all remaining COVID regulations in Northern Ireland will be lifted from the following day and replaced with guidelines.
- 15 February – Storm Dudley impacts the country with Antrim and Londonderry being issued with amber warnings.
- 18 February – Storm Eunice impacts the country days after Storm Dudley. The majority of flights at Belfast City Airport, and many at Belfast International Airport, are cancelled due to severe storm conditions.
- 20 February – Storm Franklin impacts the country with numerous road closures and power outages reported.
- 28 February – The Irish Football Association confirms that all matches against Russia are cancelled for the foreseeable future due to the 2022 Russian invasion of Ukraine.

=== March ===
- 4 March – Release of film An Irish Goodbye.
- 7 March – The 2022 Ulster Grand Prix is cancelled due to funding issues.
- 10 March – Ian Paisley Jr. calls on the British Government to act due to a steep rise in the cost of living.
- 18 March – DUP leader Paula Bradley announces that she is stepping away from politics in order to care for her elderly parents.
- 22 March – The Terror threat in Northern Ireland is lowered for the first time in 12 years, from severe to substantial.
- 23 March – The High Court squashes a decision to drop charges against a former Paratropper known as Soldier F for his role in Bloody Sunday.
- 24 March – Health Minister, Robin Swann, confirms that most people in Northern Ireland will no longer be eligible for free COVID testing from 22 April, although lateral flow tests will continue to be free for people displaying symptoms. Swann also confirms that routine contract tracing is to be phased out in Northern Ireland between mid-April and June.
- 25 March – Simon Coveney and others are evacuated from the Houben Centre on Crumlin Road due to a bomb threat.
- 29 March – Sinn Féin hold their election launch at the Europa Hotel, a move that is criticized due to it being a target of the Provisional IRA during The Troubles.

=== April ===
- 9 April – Barry's Amusements in Portrush officially reopens as Curry's Fun Park.
- 14 April – Titanic Belfast commemorates the 110th anniversary of the sinking of the Titanic.
- 18 April – Thousands attend an Easter Monday parade in Derry, organized by Saoradh.
- 26 April – A Northern Ireland man is reportedly killed in a knife attack whilst on holiday in Algarve, Portugal, another Northern Irish man appears in court in connection to the murder.

=== May ===
- 1 May – The first televised debates related to the Assembly election takes place, being broadcast on UTV.
- 3 May – The second and final televised debate takes place, being broadcast on BBC One Northern Ireland.
- 5 May – The Northern Ireland Assembly elections took place,
- 8 May – Sinn Féin is declared the largest party in Northern Ireland, winning 27 seats, followed by the DUP winning 25.
- 11 May – Sinn Féin slams Sir Jeffrey Donaldson after he states that he will stall the formation of the new Stormont Assembly if changes aren't made to the Northern Ireland protocol.
- 12 May – The Police Service of Northern Ireland issue a public apology to Bridie Brown, the widow of murdered GAA official Sean Brown. Brown was murdered by the LVF in 1992 following an abduction.
- 24 May – A new inquest into the Killing of Thomas Mills in Belfast in 1972 finds the Protestant man's death to be "completely unjustified". In 2019, evidence was found to attribute his death to a member of the King's Regiment, instead of the IRA that had long been blamed. The soldier responsible for Mills' death refuses to attend the inquest.

=== June ===
- 2–5 June 2022 – Platinum Jubilee Bank Holiday and Celebrations.
- 15 June – The European Union launches legal action against the United Kingdom, alleging a breach of post-Brexit agreements regarding the Northern Ireland Protocol.
- 16 June – A prison van is rammed in Co. Monaghan; an Armagh-based gang is suspected.
- 27 June – Northern Ireland Ambulance Service launches a pilot for body cameras due to ongoing attacks.

=== July ===
- 6 July – A number of senior ministers of the Cabinet resign due to the Chris Pincher scandal, including Northern Ireland Secretary Brandon Lewis.
- 9 July – A man dies in Larne after falling 250 ft from a Loyalist bonfire, constructed ahead of Eleventh night celebrations.
- 23 July – Heavy rainfall causes disruptions across the country, with 300 households in the Northwest applying for emergency support.

=== August ===
- 3 August – Work on a disused soccer field that was due to be redeveloped for use as a GAA field for the East Belfast GAA team is stopped due to concerning social media posts.
- 4 August – The 10 day Féile an Phobail begins in Belfast.
- 15 August – Larne F.C. suspends John Herron due to an image circulating on social media showing the player wearing a Pro-IRA shirt.
- 21 August – A LucidTalk poll by the Belfast Telegraph reveals 48% of voters support Northern Ireland remaining with the Union, 41% support a United Ireland, and 11% are undecided.
- 22 August – Following the previous day's poll results, Sinn Féin MP John Finucane announced that the party will begin discussions for the planning of Irish Unity in October.
- 28 August – A DUP Member of the Legislative Assembly comes under scrutiny after negatively responding to a tweet from the PSNI regarding new gender neutral uniforms.

=== September ===
- 2 September – William Patterson, a self proclaimed 'born again Christian' from County Londonderry is sentenced to 22 years imprisonment over 84 charges of sexually abusing children.
- 6 September – Liz Truss becomes Prime Minister of the United Kingdom, and forms the Truss ministry.
- 8 September – Elizabeth II, Queen of the United Kingdom, dies at Balmoral Castle, Scotland.
- 9 September – Northern Ireland follows the rest of the United Kingdom in entering into a period of National mourning following the death of Elizabeth II. The period will last until 7 days following her funeral.
- 10 September – The official Proclamation of accession of Charles III.
- 13 September – King Charles III and Queen Camilla travel to Northern Ireland to attend a Service of Reflection at St. Anne's Cathedral.
- 19 September – First Minister-designate Michelle O'Neill attends the State Funeral of Elizabeth II.
- 26 September – A man from Fivemiletown, County Tyrone appears in court after being charged with attempted murder after ramming police vehicles with a tractor.
- 28 September – The Alliance Party declines an invitation to an event being held by Ireland's Future named 'Together We Can' being held at the 3Arena in Dublin on 1 October.

=== October ===
- 2 October – Sean Fox (49) is shot dead in a social club in Belfast. On 5 October the police describe the murder as a 'professional hit'. They are also investigating the victim's links to Jim Donegan, a man killed in 2018.
- 12 October – A man travelling from Scotland to Bangor is rescued by the RNLI after his yacht suffers engine failure near Larne.
- 16 October – The Grand Orange Lodge of Ireland hold a memorial service for Orangemen who died during the COVID-19 pandemic.
- 20 October – Liz Truss resigns as Conservative party leader and Prime Minister of the U.K. after only 45 days in office.
- 24 October – Gordon Lyons, the Economy Minister launches a consultation which hopes to create legislation for Miscarriage Leave and Pay in Northern Ireland.
- 25 October – Rishi Sunak becomes Prime Minister of the United Kingdom and forms the Sunak ministry. He reappoints Chris Heaton-Harris as secretary of state for Northern Ireland.
- 28 October – Northern Ireland Secretary Chris Heaton-Harris announces that a fresh election will be called after efforts to form a government have been blocked by the Democratic Unionist Party in protest at the impact of the Northern Ireland Protocol.

=== November ===
- 4 November – Northern Ireland Secretary Chris Heaton-Harris indefinitely postpones plans for a snap Northern Ireland Assembly election.
- 10 November – Northern Ireland Secretary Chris Heaton-Harris announces that Northern Ireland will hold an election in 2023.
- 15 November – Health union leaders meet with a government minister to discuss staff shortages, pay disputes and potential industrial actions.
- 18 November – Four men are charged with weapons and explosives offences after a PSNI raid in the Newtownards Road area of East Belfast. The raid is in connection to the East Belfast UVF.
- 25 November – A former British Army soldier named David Holden is found guilty of manslaughter for the murder of Aidan McAnespie in 1988.

=== December ===
- 1 December – Two bodies are found near the Irish border in County Monaghan, one in a house in Broomfield, near Castleblayney, and the other in a car crash. PSNI believe the deaths are linked.
- 5 December – PSNI discover the body of a 15-year-old boy in Fintona, later identified as Matthew McAllan. The death is classified as being 'unexplained'.
- 18 December – Natalie McNally, a 32-year-old, 15 weeks pregnant woman is stabbed to death at her home in Silverwood Green in Lurgan.

== Deaths ==
=== February ===
- 19 February – Christopher Stalford (b. 1983), Democratic Unionist Party politician, former High Sheriff of Belfast.

=== March ===
- 11 March – Gavin Martin (b. 1961), journalist.

=== April ===
- 16 April – Alasdair Cassels (b. 1950), property developer.
- 19 April – Norman Surplus (b. 1963), adventurer.
- 23 April – Adrian Long (b. 1941), civil engineer.

=== June ===
- 9 June – Billy Bingham (b. 1931), footballer.

=== July ===
- 12 July – Colm McGurk (b. 1967), footballer,
- 24 July
  - Sam McCrory (b. 1965), Loyalist.
  - Sir William Wright (b.1927), bus manufacturer and politician.
- 25 July – David Trimble (b. 1944), former First Minister, Nobel prize laureate.
- 28 July – Terry Neill (b. 1942), footballer.

=== August ===
- 9 August – Kieran Denvir (b. 1932), footballer

=== September ===
- 12 September – Kim Lenaghan, journalist and radio presenter
- 15 September – Liam Holden (b. 1953), victim of a miscarriage of justice

=== October ===
- 21 October – May Blood, Baroness Blood (b. 1938) peer, member of the House of Lords (1999–2018)

=== November ===
- 8 November – Sam Gardiner (b. 1940), politician
- 10 November – Keith Farmer (b. 1987), motorcycle racer

=== December ===
- 13 December – Sir John MacDermott (b. 1927), judge of the high court (1973–1998)
- 22 December – Ronnie Lamont (b. 1941), rugby union player
