= 2023 in Northern Ireland =

- Centuries: 20th; 21st
- Decades: 2000s; 2010s; 2020s
- See also: 2023 in the United Kingdom; 2023 in Ireland; Other events of 2023; List of years in Northern Ireland

Events from the year 2023 in Northern Ireland.

== Incumbents ==
- First Minister of Northern Ireland: Vacant
- deputy First Minister of Northern Ireland: Vacant
- Secretary of State for Northern Ireland: Chris Heaton-Harris

== Events ==
=== January ===
- 4 January – The Irish Passport Office suspends posting Irish Passports to Northern Ireland and Great Britain due to the ongoing Royal Mail Strike.
- 17 January –
  - A 32-year-old man appears before Newry Magistrates’ Court on drug charges after being extradited from the US by the PSNI's International Policing Unit.
  - The Met Office issued weather warnings as heavy snowfall affects areas around Derry and Strabane.
- 18 January – The Met Office issues a 24-hour yellow weather warning across Northern Ireland, with heavy snowfall expected.
- 30 January – The Fire Brigades Union in Northern Ireland threatens the government with a strike if they are not given acceptable pay offer.

=== February ===
- 2 February – Former British Army soldier David Holden is given a suspended sentence in relation to the death of Aidan McAnespie in 1988.
- 16 February – Prime Minister Rishi Sunak arrives in Northern Ireland with plans to meet with local politicians and business representatives to discuss the Northern Ireland Protocol.
- 17 February – Sunak holds "positive conversations" with Northern Ireland's political leaders over a Protocol deal, but says there is still "work to do" before an agreement is reached.
- 21 February – Thousands of striking teachers and health care workers gather at Belfast City Hall.
- 22 February – DCI John Caldwell, an off-duty Police Service of Northern Ireland officer, is injured in Omagh after being shot by suspected New IRA gunman.
- 23 February – Three men are arrested in relation to the previous evening's shooting of DCI John Caldwell.
- 24 February –
  - Two further arrests are made as police continue to investigate the Omagh shooting.
  - A joint press conference is held by the leaders of Northern Ireland's five main political parties, and PSNI Chief Constable Simon Byrne in regards to the attempted murder of DCI John Caldwell.
- 26 February – Police arrest a sixth man in connection with the Omagh shooting.
- 27 February – Prime Minister Rishi Sunak and President of the European Commission Ursula von der Leyen announce a new Brexit deal for Northern Ireland, named the Windsor Framework.
- 28 February – Sunak meets with businesses and their employees in Belfast, to secure support for his new Brexit deal. He tells them that being in both the single market and the UK makes Northern Ireland the "world's most exciting economic zone" and "an incredibly attractive place to invest."

=== March ===
- 1 March – A further two arrests are made as police continue to investigate the Omagh shooting.
- 9 March – Heavy snowfall affects Northern Ireland causing major disruptions.
- 13 March – The United States President Joe Biden announced that he will visit Ireland, north and south, in April for the 25th anniversary of the Good Friday Agreement (signed on 10 April 1998).
- 21 March – Stormont is to ban Northern Ireland's civil servants from using the TikTok app on their official devices amid concerns over its security and following a similar decision by the Westminster Government.
- 28 March – Northern Ireland's terrorist threat is raised from substantial to severe following an increase in activity by dissident republicans.

=== April ===
- 9 April – PSNI disrupt a New IRA plot that was alleged to have been aimed to disrupt Joe Biden's visit later in the month.
- 10 April – Riots erupt following annual Easter parades in Belfast, with PSNI vehicles being attacked with petrol bombs.
- 11 April – US President Joe Biden arrives in Belfast to mark the 25th anniversary of the Good Friday Agreement.
- 12 April –
  - Prime Minister Rishi Sunak meets with US President Joe Biden at the Grand Central Hotel in Belfast.
  - Biden makes a keynote speech at the Ulster University during which he urges Northern Ireland's politicians to restore the power-sharing government.
- 18 April – Colm Murphy, the man found liable for the Omagh Bombing in 1998, dies at the age of 70.
- 20 April – Police confirm that John Caldwell, the senior detective shot at a sports complex in February, has been discharged from hospital to continue his recovery at home.
- 21 April –
  - Thomas McKenna, a former GAA club treasurer from Crossmaglen, is sentenced to 16 years in prison after pleading guilty to 162 sexual offences involving 23 boys and young men between 1988 and 2018.
  - Belfast-based Harland & Wolff delivers its first complete vessel for two decades.
  - A 2021 study by the Equality Commission for Northern Ireland indicates the number of Catholic and Protestant workers in Northern Ireland's workforce is almost equal, with Protestants making up 43.5% of the workforce, Catholics comprising 43.4% and those identified as "non-determined" making up 13.1%.
- 25 April – Members of the National Union of Journalists at BBC Radio Foyle announce they have "withdrawn confidence" in BBC Northern Ireland management over recent changes in the service.

=== May ===
- 18 May – The 2023 Northern Ireland local elections are held.
- 20 May – Sinn Féin are now the largest political party in Northern Ireland after making significant gains in the local election votes.

=== June ===
- 6 June – Daniel Sebastian Allen, 32, is sentenced to life imprisonment for killing four members of the same family in a fire at a cottage in County Fermanagh in February 2018. A hearing to determine the length of time Allen must serve in prison before being eligible for parole is scheduled for September.
- 8 June – Ian Greer, the Vice Chancellor of Queen's University Belfast, warns that around 1,200 students may not be able to graduate in 2023 due to a boycott on marking and assessment as part of industrial action being staged by the University and College Union. The figure is subsequently revised down to 750.
- 12 June – Two men are charged over the murder of Ballymena resident Chloe Mitchell.
- 22 June – At Belfast Crown Court, David Gill is sentenced to life imprisonment with a minimum of 16 years after admitting the murder of Pat McCormick, a love rival who he killed in October 2022 before disposing of his remains in a wheelie bin.
- 30 June –
  - An inquest into the death of Leo Norney, a teenager shot dead by a soldier in 1975, rules that he was "entirely innocent", and that his patrol concocted a story of being fired on to cover it up.
  - The Met Office confirms June 2023 was the hottest month on record in Northern Ireland.

=== July ===
- 11 July – Police have said they are treating the placing of an effigy of Sinn Féin Vice President Michelle O'Neill on a bonfire in County Tyrone as a hate crime, and are liaising with community representatives.
- 31 July – A statue of black American anti-slavery campaigner Frederick Douglass is unveiled in Belfast city centre.

=== August ===
- 1 August – Met Office data for July 2023 indicates it to be Northern Ireland's wettest July on record, and the sixth wettest for the UK as a whole.
- 3 August – Media Nation 2023, a report published by the UK media watchdog Ofcom, indicates that Channel 4 comedy Derry Girls was the most watched television programme in Northern Ireland during 2022. Northern Ireland is the only part of the UK where a Channel 4 programme featured in the top ten most watched shows.
- 4 August – UTV presenter Pamela Ballantine reveals to the Belfast Telegraph that she was diagnosed with breast cancer in 2022 and has undergone successful chemotherapy, and urges women to have breast screening tests.
- 7 August – Dame Brenda King, the Attorney General for Northern Ireland, orders fresh inquests into the murders of Sean Anderson, Thomas Armstrong, Dwayne O'Donnell, Thomas Casey and Phelim McNally, five Catholics killed by the Ulster Volunteer Force, on account of "deficiencies" in the original investigations and inquests.
- 8 August – The Police Service of Northern Ireland issues an apology after a data breach led to the details of its officers being published online.
- 9 August – A second Police Service of Northern Ireland data breach is revealed after it emerges a spreadsheet containing the names of 200 officers was stolen from a car in July 2023.
- 10 August – Simon Byrne, the Chief Constable of the Police Service of Northern Ireland, says he is "deeply sorry" about two "industrial scale" data breaches, but will not resign over the controversy.
- 13 August – A memorial service is held in Omagh to mark the 25th anniversary of the 1998 Omagh bombing.
- 14 August – At a press conference, Police Chief Simon Byrne says that information accidentally disclosed by the Police Service of Northern Ireland is in the hands of dissident republicans after a document containing some of the information is posted on a wall near the Sinn Féin offices in west Belfast.
- 18 August – The Police Service of Northern Ireland confirm an officer's laptop and notebook fell from the roof of his car on the M2 motorway. Both are recovered, but it is confirmed the following day that pages from the notebook, which include the details of 42 members of police staff, are still missing.
- 19 August – A 50-year-old man is charged with possessing documents or records likely to be useful to terrorists following the Police Service of Northern Ireland data breach.
- 22 August – Thomas Hogg, a former Democratic Unionist Party mayor of Antrim and Newtownabbey Council, is stripped of his MBE following a 2021 conviction for sexual assault against a teenage boy.
- 23 August – Asda becomes the first supermarket in Northern Ireland to begin labelling its products with "Not for EU" labels, a requirement of the Windsor Framework which is scheduled to become mandatory from October 2023.
- 26 August – Police appeal for information about the whereabouts of convicted murderer Thomas McCabe after he failed to return to prison from day release on 23 August. It is the second time McCabe, who was sentenced to life imprisonment for murder in 1990, has failed to return to prison following release.
- 31 August – Chief Constable Simon Byrne says he will not resign following a six-hour emergency meeting with the Northern Ireland Policing Board in the light of a number of controversies involving the Police Service of Northern Ireland.

=== September ===
- 1 September – The Democratic Unionist Party tables a motion of no confidence in Chief Constable Simon Byrne with the Northern Ireland Policing Board following his refusal to resign at a meeting held the previous day.
- 4 September – Simon Byrne resigns as Chief Constable of the Police Service of Northern Ireland with immediate effect following a number of recent controversies.
- 6 September – The Police Federation of Northern Ireland unanimously passes a vote of no confidence in PSNI Deputy Chief Constable Mark Hamilton, Chief Operating Officer Pamela McCreedy and Assistant Chief Officer Clare Duffield.
- 21 September – Health and social care staff belonging to Unite, Unison and the Northern Ireland Public Service Alliance (Nipsa) begin a 48-hour strike. The industrial action involves some nurses, ambulance workers and hospital support staff.
- 22 September –
  - Members of the Royal College of Midwives stage a 24-hour strike in Northern Ireland over a long running dispute.
  - Ulster University removes references to "world leading" from advertising posters following a complaint to eve Advertising Standards Authority.
- 28 September – Tesco becomes the first supermarket to display "Not for EU" posters in its Northern Ireland stores.
- 29 September – Following the publication of a report the previous day into COVID-19 outbreaks at two Northern Ireland hospitals which resulted in a number of deaths, the campaign group Covid-19 Bereaved Families for Justice warns that failures identified in the report still exist.

=== October ===
- 2 October – The Met Office says that September 2023 was the joint warmest on record for Northern Ireland with an average temperature of 14.2 °C, matching September 2006 and September 2021.
- 4 October – BBC News reports that Jon Boutcher has been selected as interim Chief Constable of the Police Service of Northern Ireland, subject to approval.
- 9 October – About 17,500 women in Northern Ireland are to have their smear tests re-checked as part of a major review of cervical screening dating back to 2008 after flaws were identified in the screening process at the Southern Trust.
- 12 October – Jon Boutcher is formally sworn in as the interim Chief Constable of the Police Service of Northern Ireland.
- 16 October – The Department for Communities begins contacting 71,000 households in Northern Ireland claiming any of the six benefits that are to be replaced with Universal Credit in preparation to move them on to Universal Credit.
- 18 October – The Met Office issues a yellow weather alert for Northern Ireland for heavy and prolonged rain ahead of the arrival of Storm Babet.
- 23 October – Relatives of the nine people killed in the 1993 Shankill Road bombing unveil a memorial on the 30th anniversary of the attack.
- 24 October – A doctor from Derry, Northern Ireland, who used her position to spread misinformation about the COVID-19 vaccine, has her suspension extended by six months by the General Medical Council.
- 25 October – Around 11 trees at County Antrim's Dark Hedges, made famous by the fantasy series Game of Thrones, may have to be felled after a report found them to be in poor condition and a danger to safety.
- 29 October – The Bar Council of Northern Ireland announces a one-day barristers' strike on 17 November over what it describes as "wholly unreasonable delays" in barristers receiving legal aid payments. The industrial action will include around 200 barristers.

=== November ===
- 6 November – Around half of adult rail fares in Northern Ireland are increased as Translink raises its fares, with an average adult fare rising by 50p.
- 8 November – Jon Boutcher is appointed as Chief Constable of the Police Service of Northern Ireland.
- 13 November – Six trees at the Dark Hedges tourist spot are to be cut down after a recent report found all of them are in a poor state of health.
- 22 November – The GMB, Unite and SIPTU trade unions, who represent workers at Northern Ireland's Translink bus and rail services, announce a one-day strike for Friday 1 December.
- 23 November – The Unite union announces that school support staff in Northern Ireland will stage a strike over pay on 1 December.
- 28 November – Sir Robert Buckland is elected as chair of the House of Commons Northern Ireland Affairs Select Committee.
- 29 November – The first case of potentially collapsible reinforced autoclaved aerated concrete to be discovered in Northern Ireland is found at a South Belfast primary school.

=== December ===
- 1 December – Strikes take place across Northern Ireland's transport network, as well as in schools as support staff stage a one-day stoppage.
- 2 December – An off-duty British soldier, named as Major Kevin McCool of Northern Ireland, has been killed in an attack in Kenya, the Ministry of Defence confirms.
- 6 December –
  - The Public Prosecution Service announces that 16 people investigated as part of Operation Kenova will not face any charges. Those investigated include former members of the IRA and security forces personnel.
  - Three more strike days involving Translink bus and train staff are announced for 15, 16 and 22 December.
- 7 December –
  - PSNI chief constable Jon Boutcher confirms that a planned 7% pay rise for police officers will go ahead despite financial pressures on the force.
  - At Belfast Crown Court, former minister James Henry Clarke, 81, is given a two-year prison sentence suspended for three years, for historical sexual abuse committed against boys in two care homes where he worked.
- 11 December – The UK government is offering a £2.5bn financial package for the return of a Stormont Executive, which includes funds to settle public sector disputes and for public services.
- 12 December – The COVID-19 Inquiry hears that WhatsApp messages on devices sent by ministers at Stormont are unavailable because their government-issued electronic devices were reset to factory settings.
- 14 December – A former British soldier, known as Soldier F, is to stand trial for two murders and five attempted murders during the 1972 Bloody Sunday massacre.
- 15 December –
  - Police have seized cocaine worth an estimated £10m during an operation in south Armagh, believed to be the largest seizure of the drug in Northern Ireland.
  - A 48-hour public transport strike, the first of two scheduled in the days preceding Christmas, begins in Northern Ireland.
- 18 December – Approximately 50 health system warehouse workers belonging to the Nipsa union begin a five-day strike over pay and safe staffing levels.
- 19 December – The Royal College of Midwives announces a one-day strike for midwives and maternity support workers on 18 January 2024.
- 20 December – Tánaiste Micheál Martin announces Irish government plans to "initiate an inter-State case against the United Kingdom under the European Convention on Human Rights" over provisions in the Northern Ireland Troubles (Legacy and Reconciliation) Act 2023 which offers immunity from prosecution for certain Troubles-era related offences.
- 21 December –
  - Primark apologises after an employee at its Belfast store was told she could not wear a Christmas jumper bearing the Irish language greeting for Happy Christmas, Nollaig shona.
  - Rare nacreous clouds are seen over Northern Ireland and captured by photographers.
- 22 December – A 24-hour transport workers strike goes ahead in Northern Ireland.
- 25 December – Around 500 addresses in County Down have been left without power due to a supply failure.
- 28 December – Files released from the Public Records Office of Northern Ireland show there were concerns for the Northern Ireland economy following the September 11 terrorist attacks of 2001, when British Airways cancelled a regular flight between London and Belfast in the wake of 9/11, and with 30,000 fewer tourists expected to visit during 2002.

== Sports ==
- 2022–23 NIFL Premiership
- 2022–23 Irish Cup

== Deaths ==
- 1 February – Eddie Spence, 97, Gaelic footballer (Antrim).
- 19 February – Henry McDonald, 57, writer and journalist.
- 26 February – Ian Hunter, 75, artist and art curator.
- 3 March – Rita O'Hare, 80, Irish Republican and Sinn Féin strategist.
- 31 March – Harry Cassidy, 92, Gaelic footballer (Bellaghy, Derry).
- 6 April – Jim McKeever, 92, Gaelic footballer (Derry, Ballymaguigan, Newbridge).
- 8 April – Deborah Brown, 95, sculptor.
- 11 April – Freddie Scappaticci, 77, double agent.
- 18 April – Colm Murphy, 70, Irish Republican.
- 4 May – Robert Carswell, Baron Carswell, 88, jurist, lord chief justice (1997–2004).
- 15 May – Marty Lynch, 59, Gaelic and association footballer.
- 21 May – Ray Stevenson, 58, actor.
- 28 May - George Cassidy, 86, jazz musician and music teacher to Van Morrison.
- 30 July – Frank Rodgers, 82, Gaelic footballer (Beragh Red Knights, Tyrone).
- 13 August – Norman Drew, 91, golfer.
- 26 September – Maurice Leitch, 90, author.
- 1 October – Eve Bunting, 94, Northern Irish-born American author (Smoky Night, The Presence: A Ghost Story), pneumonia.
- 13 October – Hugh Russell, 63, boxer, Olympic bronze medallist (1980).
- 5 November – David Hilditch, 60, DUP politician and Member of the Northern Ireland Assembly (1998–2003).
- 1 December – Winston Churchill Rea, 70s, Northern Irish loyalist. (death announced on this date)
- 10 December – Syd Millar, 89, Northern Irish rugby union player (Ballymena, Ireland national team), coach (British & Irish Lions), and executive, chairman of the IRB (2003–2007). (death announced on this date)
- 28 December – Patrick Walsh, 92, Roman Catholic prelate, bishop of Down and Connor (1991–2008).
