= Breda Academy =

Location
- Newtownbreda Road; Belfast, County Antrim, BT8 6PY; Northern Ireland

Information
- Type: Controlled Secondary
- Motto: Learners Today, Leaders Tomorrow
- Established: September 2015; 10 years ago
- Status: Open
- Local authority: Education Authority
- Principal: TBA
- Staff: 90
- Gender: Co-Educational
- Age: 11 to 18
- Enrollment: 700 (approx.)
- Colour
- Website: www.breda.academy

Breda Academy is a controlled secondary school in Belfast, Northern Ireland, which opened in September 2015.

== History ==
Breda Academy opened in 2015 as an amalgamation between Newtownbreda High School and Knockbreda High School.

== Enrollment ==
The school currently has just under 700 students enrolled at the school, with 150 enrolled within the schools Sixth Form.

In September 2022, the school enrolled 130 new year 8 students.

== Academics ==
The school offers both GCSE and A Level courses for study.

The school states that, in 2022, 98% of year 12 students achieved 5 or more GCSEs at grades A*-C (62% including English and Maths) and 70% of year 14 students achieved 3 A Levels at grades A*-C.
