= 2021 in Northern Ireland =

- Centuries: 20th; 21st
- Decades: 2000s; 2010s; 2020s
- See also: 2021 in the United Kingdom; 2021 in Ireland; Other events of 2021; List of years in Northern Ireland

Events from the year 2021 in Northern Ireland.

== Incumbents ==
- First Minister of Northern Ireland
  - Arlene Foster (until 14 June)
  - Vacant (14–17 June)
  - Paul Givan (from 17 June)
- deputy First Minister of Northern Ireland – Michelle O'Neill
- Secretary of State for Northern Ireland – Brandon Lewis

== Events ==
=== January ===
- 1 January - First freight arrives in Northern Ireland after the Irish Sea Border comes into effect under the Provisions of the Northern Ireland Protocol.
- 5 January - Education Executive announces AQE/GL transfer tests will not go ahead, then AQE announces they will hold one exam in late February, postponed for a second time.
- 6 January – Education Minister Peter Weir announces that GCSE, AS Level and A Level exams scheduled for summer 2021 will be cancelled because of the COVID-19 pandemic.
- 9 January – Lorry drivers from Northern Ireland travelling directly to France from the Irish Republic have been told they will need a recent negative COVID test in order to do so. Drivers have been using a route from Rosslare to Cherbourg to avoid UK delays caused by COVID.
- 10 January – All of Northern Ireland's six health trusts have forecast that the number of patients in hospital with COVID could double by the third week of January.
- 17 January – Jennifer Welsh, Chief Executive of the Northern Health and Social Care Trust, says that hospitals are preparing for a peak in admissions from COVID during the coming week.
- 21 January - The lockdown restrictions for Northern Ireland are extended until 5 March.
- 22 January - Following the cancellation of transfer tests, it is reported that grammar schools in Northern Ireland will not use academic tests to admit pupils in 2021.
- 28 January - The Northern Ireland Executive agrees that most schools in Northern Ireland will not return until at least Monday 8 March.

=== February ===
- 1 February - Health Minister Robin Swann confirms that as of Sunday 31 January, 246,421 COVID vaccinations had been given in Northern Ireland.
- 2 February – GCSE, AS and A Level qualifications will be calculated by schools in 2021, it is confirmed.
- 8 February – People from Northern Ireland crossing the border into the Irish Republic without a reasonable excuse are being sent back by Gardai, and face a fine of €100 (£88).

=== March ===
- 3 March - The Loyalist Communities Council and other loyalist groups tell Prime Minister Boris Johnson that they are withdrawing support for the Good Friday Agreement in opposition to the Northern Ireland Protocol.
- 8 March - Pupils in Years P1 to P3 return to school. The plan is for them to return to remote learning on 22 March, but Education Minister Peter Weir announced plans to change this to allow for them to stay in the classroom, saying the present plans do not make "enormous sense”.
- 12 March - The UK Government agrees to deploy 100 military medical personnel to Northern Ireland to help with the accelerated rollout of the COVID-19 vaccine.
- 19 March - The head of the Loyalist Communities Council, David Campbell, says that the Good Friday Agreement is under threat under the current conditions of Brexit and Northern Ireland. Campbell warns that it could unleash a "political crisis" and says that the Northern Irish Protocol breaches the 1998 accord.
- 21 March - 2021 United Kingdom census. Figures released in 2022 show the proportion of the Northern Ireland population which is Roman Catholic (or raised Catholic) is 45.7% compared to 43.48% Protestant, the first time a Catholic majority has been recorded.
- 30 March - Loyalists begin rioting in parts of Derry and Belfast in response to the introduction of the Irish Sea Border and PPS decision not to prosecute Sinn Féin for attending the funeral of Bobby Storey. This is the beginning of the 2021 Northern Ireland riots.

=== April ===
- 2 April - Following a protest on Sandy Row, a riot erupts and Ulster Loyalists attack the PSNI with bottles, bricks, petrol bombs and fireworks. Eight people are arrested in total.
- 3 April - Riots break out in Loyalist areas of Newtonabbey, multiple vehicles are hijacked and set ablaze, and petrol bombs thrown at police.
- 4 April - Minor events continue during rioting in Newtonabbey, with further disturbances taking place on the North Road area of Carrickfergus. Projectiles including bricks, bottles and incendiary devices are used against police.
- 5 April -
  - PSNI officers are attacked after a call in regards to a suspicious object on Templemore Road in Derry, considered to be an “elaborate hoax”.
  - A bonfire is built in the middle of North Road in Carrickfergus. Projectiles including petrol bombs are thrown at police.
  - Nine police officers are injured across Newtonabbey and Carrickfergus.
  - Several unauthorized Loyalist parades take place in areas such as Portadown, Ballymena and Markethill. PSNI say the parades breach COVID-19 regulations and have not been authorized by the Parades Commission.
- 6 April - Rioters again gather in Derry and other areas, with vehicles being set alight in the Sperrin Park area of Nelson Drive.
- 7 April -
  - Rioters gather in Belfast at the junction of Lanark Way and the Shankhill Road. PSNI officers are once again attacked and a bus was hijacked and set alight.
  - A Belfast Telegraph photographer is attacked whilst covering the riots in Belfast.
- 8 April -
  - The Northern Ireland Assembly calls for an immediate end to the rioting, with MLAs calling on the violence to stop.
  - Crowds again gather in West Belfast, throwing bricks and projectiles at police on Springfield Road, police respond by using water cannons. A police dog and 19 officers are injured.
- 9 April -
  - Flags fly at half mast at Stormont following the death of Prince Philip.
  - Police are attacked in the Tiger's Bay area of North Belfast. A car is also set alight.
- 10 April - As the Department of Health announces that the milestone of a million COVID-19 vaccinations has been reached in Northern Ireland, Health Minister Robin Swann describes it as "a landmark".
- 11 April - The Loyalist paramilitary group, the Ulster Volunteer Force (UVF), reportedly orders the removal of Catholic families from a housing estate in Carrickfergus.
- 12 April -
  - School pupils across Northern Ireland return to the classrooms following the strict COVID-19 lockdown.
  - A burning vehicle is left on the railway line near Bellarena, Derry. A train on the Belfast to Derry route avoids a collision.
- 13 April - Health Minister Robin Swann tells the Northern Ireland Assembly it could take ten years to clear Northern Ireland's backlog of hospital waiting lists unless there is significant investment from the Executive.
- 15 April - Stormont gives the go-ahead for outdoor hospitality, gyms and non-essential retail to reopen on 30 April, and for indoor hospitality to reopen on 24 May.
- 19 April -A female PSNI officer discovers an explosive device behind her vehicle in Dungiven; an Army bomb squad makes the device safe. The New IRA are blamed for the attempted attack.
- 22 April - The New IRA issues a statement admitting to the bomb plot in Dungiven days prior.
- 23 April - Northern Ireland Fire and Rescue Service begins tackling a wildfire in the Mourne Mountains near Newcastle, County Down.
- 25 April - Loyalist Willie Young is shot in the chest outside his home in the Mount Vernon Park area of Belfast. He is able to walk to the ambulance.
- 28 April - Arlene Foster announces that she will resign as Democratic Unionist Party leader on 28 May, and as First Minister in June. This follows 29 DUP MLAs and 4 DUP MPs signing a letter of no confidence.
- 29 April - Following a strict COVID-19 lockdown, non-essential businesses reopen, including outdoor service at pubs and restaurants.

=== May ===
- 1 May - In a Centenary poll run by Kantar, it is revealed that 44% of people support a unity referendum, but the majority of people on both sides of the border would be opposed to paying higher tax to finance a united Ireland.
- 3 May - Northern Ireland celebrates its centenary, the 'NI100' term was used for marketing purposes.
- 5 May - The Housing Executive reports a 150% increase in the number of people seeking emergency accommodation during 2020.
- 8 May - Ulster Unionist Party leader Steve Aiken announces he is stepping down as party leader.
- 11 May -
  - According to a coroner's inquest report, ten people shot dead in the 1971 Ballymurphy massacre in Belfast were innocent civilians and their killings were unjustified. Nine of the people had been shot by the British Armed Forces.
  - Derry City and Strabane District Council confirms the Clipper Round the World Yacht Race will return to Derry in 2022.
- 13 May - The Executive announces further easing of COVID-19 restrictions planned to come into force from 24 May, including allowing non essential travel to Northern Ireland from other parts of the Common Travel Area, allowing spectators to attend sporting events, and allowing for the reopening of libraries and museums.
- 14 May - Edwin Poots is selected as the new leader of the Democratic Unionist Party.
- 18 May - The number of people in Northern Ireland to receive their first COVID vaccine passes one million, meaning roughly 69% of the population have been vaccinated with their first dose.
- 20 May - Stormont gives the go-ahead for indoor hospitality to reopen from Monday 24 May, when six people from two separate households will be permitted to meet up indoors. A traffic lights system for overseas travel will also begin on the same day.
- 24 May – Further COVID-19 lockdown restrictions are loosened with indoor hospitality being permitted to reopen across the country, while six people from two separate households can meet up indoors again.
- 28 May - Edwin Poots is ratified as the leader of the Democratic Unionist Party.

=== June ===
- 2 June - The Grand Orange Lodge of Ireland of the Loyal Orange Institution confirms the Twelfth of July parades will go ahead this year, after the 2020 parades were cancelled due to the COVID-19 pandemic.
- 3 June - Edwin Poots states Arlene Foster will remain First Minister in order to lead a June 11 British-Irish Council meeting.
- 14 June – Arlene Foster resigns as First Minister of Northern Ireland.
- 15 June - Stena Line announces a new weekend ferry route between Belfast and Holyhead, starting 25 June.
- 17 June
  - Edwin Poots resigns as Leader of the Democratic Unionist Party (D.U.P) After only 21 Days as leader but will remain in post until a replacement leader is elected by the Party
  - Paul Givan assumes the roll of First minister despite D.U.P members objecting.
- 22 June - Sir Jeffrey Donaldson is nominated as the new leader of the Democratic Unionist Party, being the only person to put his name forward for the post.
- 26 June - Sir Jeffrey Donaldson officially assumes the position as leader of the Democratic Unionist Party.

=== July ===
- 1 July - BBC Northern Ireland Radio presenter Stephen Nolan takes legal action against an online troll and is to receive a six figure payout for damages.
- 6 July - Deputy First Minister Michelle O'Neill has described as reckless Prime Minister Boris Johnson's plans to end all COVID restrictions for England on 19 July. She states Northern Ireland would not follow the same model.
- 9 July - Executive ministers take legal action against the PSNI due to their lack of actions concerning a controversial bonfire being constructed in Tiger's Bay, North Belfast.
- 10 July - A controversial bonfire in Portadown collapses after being ignited overnight.
- 12 July - Smaller, local parades take place across Northern Ireland by Loyalists celebrating The Twelfth.
- 13 July - At the House of Commons, SDLP leader Colum Eastwood uses parliamentary privilege to name Soldier F, the British soldier whose identity was hidden following a murder trial into his participation in Bloody Sunday in 1972.
- 21 July - Derry City and Strabane council are approved to provide £50,000 for a major event to mark the 50th anniversary of Bloody Sunday in January 2022.
- 26 July - Ministers agree to re-open theatres and concert venues from 27 July, at 6PM.
- 31 July - In Gaelic football Tyrone defeat Monaghan 0–16 to 0–15 to win the Anglo-Irish cup at Croke Park.

=== August ===
- 5 August - The Armagh weather observatory announces that Armagh recorded its driest July in 21 years.
- 6 August - Flooding in Belfast affects a number of businesses and homes near the city centre. The floods are described as being the "worst flooding in years."
- 15 August - Republican youths in the Bogside area of Derry, build and ignite a bonfire, similar to the Loyalists fires built a month prior. The fire is criticized due to it featuring Israeli flags and signs featuring murdered PSNI officers.
- 21 August - PSNI are investigating reports of firearms being used by masked Irish Republicans at a commemoration in Derry in remembrance of hunger striker Michael Devine.
- 28 August - The Royal Black Institution holds its Last Saturday parades for the first time since 2019, with 17,000 marchers and bandsmen taking part.
- 31 August - Deputy First Minister Michelle O'Neill confirms that she has been diagnosed with COVID-19.

=== September ===
- 7 September - The Irish Football Association is criticized due to ticket pricing ahead of the World Cup qualifier match against Switzerland at Windsor Park.
- 11 September - In Gaelic football, Tyrone defeats Mayo in the 2021 All-Ireland Senior Football Championship Final at Croke Park in Dublin. In doing so, Tyrone wins a fourth title and denies Mayo their first title since 1951.
- 13 September - Hundreds of young people gather for a street party in the Holylands area of Belfast, in what has been described as the worst night of disturbance in a decade.
- 17 September - Around 350 people gathered on the Newtownards Road in East Belfast in protest of the Northern Ireland Protocol.
- 21 September – Deputy First Minister Michelle O'Neill warns Northern Ireland's health service is "about to topple over" and faces a "difficult winter" if urgent action is not taken.

=== October ===
- 1 October - The Parades Commission announces it has banned a centenary parade from entering the Kilcoole area of Belfast due to it being a mixed area. The North Belfast Orange Lodge condemned the decision.
- 3 October - The Belfast City Marathon takes place, with Olympian Mick Clohisey and Armagh's Fionnuala Ross winning the men and women's titles.
- 7 October – The Northern Ireland Executive agrees to scrap the requirement for social distancing in bars and restaurants from 31 October, meaning nightclubs will be allowed to reopen from that date.
- 13 October - The European Union issues new proposes that would see an 80% reduction on customs checks on the Irish Sea, Sinn Féin and the SDLP welcome the proposal, whereas Unionsts reject it.
- 17 October - In Snooker, Mark Allen wins the 2021 Northern Ireland Open.
- 21 October - A church service is held in Armagh to mark the Northern Ireland centenary, neither Queen Elizabeth II or Irish President Michael D. Higgins accepted an invite.

=== November ===
- 1 November - A Translink bus is hijacked and burned in Newtownards by members of the Protestant Action Force, claiming it to be the start of a campaign against the Northern Ireland Protocol.
- 3 November - Anti-Northern Ireland Protocol rallies take place on Lanark Way in West Belfast with fireworks being thrown at police officers.
- 8 November - Translink bus drivers stage a spontaneous walk-out in response to the recent hijacking of a bus in Newtownards.
- 14 November - Remembrance Day events take place across Northern Ireland, including a controversial UVF march on the Shankill Road.
- 17 November – Northern Ireland's ministers vote to introduce mandatory COVID passports for Northern Ireland from December, which will need to be produced for entry into pubs, restaurants and nightclubs.
- 21 November – Justice Minister Naomi Long describes plans drawn up in a government document to give her department responsibility for raising the compliance level of wearing face coverings to at least 80% as "highly inappropriate".
- 26 November - Storm Arwen swept across Northern Ireland, with a man in County Antrim being killed by a falling tree.

=== December ===
- 4 December – The annual Lundy Parade is held in Derry, the first full event since 2019.
- 6 December - Stormont announces it will begin debating a ban on hunting with dogs in Northern Ireland.
- 7 December - Thousands of homes lose power as Storm Barra hits the British isles.
- 13 December – COVID Passes become enforceable for hospitality businesses in Northern Ireland, with a £10,000 fine for any venue that does not comply.
- 20 December - Due to the rise in COVID cases, Queen's University Belfast announces that it will return to remote learning in January.
- 26 December - COVID-19-related restrictions are reintroduced, which includes closing nightclubs and banning indoor seating at events, restricting socialisation to three households, and reintroducing the rule of six at bars, restaurants, and pubs that only offer table service.

== Deaths ==
=== January ===
5 January - James Greene (b 1931), actor.

=== February ===
3 February - James Fenton (b 1931), poet.

5 February - Ernie Tate (b 1934), anti-war activist.

=== March ===
4 March - Jimmy Spratt (b 1951), politician.

8 March - Danny McAlinden (b 1947), boxer.

11 March - Ken Wilkinson, Loyalist activist.

15 March - Jim Dornan (b 1948), obstetrician and gynecologist.

=== May ===
13 May - Seamus Deane (b 1940), poet.

=== June ===
11 June - Lucinda Riley (b 1966), author

20 June - Gordon Dunne (b 1959), politician

=== July ===
17 July - James McConnell (b 1937), pastor

=== August ===
9 August - Colm McKinstry (b 1949), Gaelic football manager.

29 August - Rodney Rice (b 1944), Journalist.

=== October ===
4 October - Terry Eades (b 1944), Footballer.

28 October - Davy Tweed (b 1959) Rugby player and politician.

=== November ===
30 November - Barney Carr (b 1923), Gaelic footballer.
