= 2019 in Northern Ireland =

- Centuries: 20th; 21st
- Decades: 1990s; 2000s; 2010s; 2020s
- See also: 2019 in the United Kingdom; 2019 in Ireland; Other events of 2019; List of years in Northern Ireland

Events from the year 2019 in Northern Ireland.

== Incumbents ==
- First minister of Northern Ireland – Vacant
- deputy first minister of Northern Ireland – Vacant
- Secretary of state for Northern Ireland – Karen Bradley (until 24 July), Julian Smith (from 24 July)

== Events ==
- 19 January – car bomb attack at a courthouse in Derry, for which the New IRA are the "main line of enquiry".
- 2 May – Elections in all 11 councils in Northern Ireland.
- 18 September – The Historical Enquiries Team finds the British Army responsible for the Killing of Thomas Mills, a 1972 death of a night watchman that had long been attributed to the IRA.
- 12 December – Northern Ireland's 18 seats in the British House of Commons are contested in the 2019 United Kingdom general election. The results are DUP 8 seats (down 1), Sinn Féin 7 seats (no change), SDLP 2 seats (up 2), and Alliance Party 1 one seat (up 1).

== Sport ==
- July – The Open Championship (golf) held at Royal Portrush Golf Club; winner: Shane Lowry.

== Deaths ==
- 21 January – Padraic Fiacc, poet, (born 1924)
- 10 February – Sam McCready, actor, theatre director and playwright, (born 1936)
- 18 April – Lyra McKee, journalist (born 1990)
