= John Kelly (Sinn Féin politician) =

Sinn Féin politician, born 1936

Member of the Northern Ireland Assembly for Mid Ulster
- In office 25 June 1998 – 26 November 2003
- Preceded by: New Creation
- Succeeded by: Geraldine Dougan

Personal details
- Born: John Kelly; 5 April 1936 Belfast, Northern Ireland
- Died: 6 September 2007 (aged 71) Maghera, County Londonderry
- Party: Sinn Féin
- Spouse: Philomena Kelly
- Children: Bronagh Kelly

John Kelly (5 April 1936 – 6 September 2007) was an Irish republican politician in Northern Ireland. He joined the Irish Republican Army in the 1950s, and was a founder member and a leader of the Provisional Irish Republican Army in the early 1970s.

== Personal life ==
John Kelly was born in Belfast, County Antrim, in 1936. Later in life he moved to Maghera, County Londonderry, where he lived until his death in 2007. He and his wife had a daughter. He was a dedicated member of local Gaelic Athletic Association club Watty Graham's Glen and a keen supporter of Gaelic games and the Irish language.

== IRA member ==
Kelly joined the IRA in the early 1950s when he was 18 and took part in the Border Campaign of 1956–62, but was arrested in December 1956 and was imprisoned until 1963. He was a member of the Northern Ireland Civil Rights Association in 1967–69 which led on to sectarian riots in Belfast. A leader of the newly formed Provisional IRA in 1969, he was involved in the formation of "citizens' defence groups" to protect nationalist areas of Belfast from loyalist rioters who were largely unhampered by the police.

=== Prison record ===
He was jailed on three occasions for IRA related activity spending a total of fifteen years in prison in Northern Ireland and the Republic of Ireland. His first term was for his activity in the 1956 IRA border campaign, He also served a six-month term in 1973 in the Republic of Ireland for being a member of the IRA.

Commenting later on the Troubles, he said: "Yes, it was a terrible period. But you can't turn the clock back. The Irish government did not create the Provisional IRA. What happened was as inevitable as the changing seasons."

=== Arms Trial ===
The citizens' defence groups sought help from the government in Dublin in 1969, then led by Jack Lynch. Several ministers responded and arranged a fund of £100,000 but the planned arms shipment failed. Kelly later said: "These discussions were all about guns. The whole thing was government-sponsored, government-backed and government-related." The planning included travel to Britain, Europe, and on to the US where he met the founders of Noraid. Kelly was one of the co-defendants in the subsequent Dublin "Arms Trial" with ministers Charles Haughey and Neil Blaney, accused of conspiring to import arms illegally into the Republic of Ireland. The trial eventually collapsed from a lack of evidence, as the relevant government files were kept secret, but the Irish government sacked several ministers as a result.

== Councillor and MLA 1997–2003 ==
Kelly went into electoral politics, serving on Magherafelt District Council from 1997. He was elected in the 1998 election to the Northern Ireland Assembly as a Sinn Féin member for Mid Ulster. Kelly was deselected before the 2003 election, and criticised the decision by the Sinn Féin leadership to support policing reforms. In January 2006 he co-wrote a letter with Brendan Hughes which cast doubt on the claims that dissident republicans had threatened Sinn Féin leaders and claimed that the real threats were being made by the Sinn Féin leadership against those who sought a debate on policing. He left Sinn Féin which he considered too controlled from the centre, opposing the leadership: "deceit and the philosophy of creative ambiguity", and retired from politics.

Kelly died from cancer on 6 September 2007 after a long illness. Many tributes have been paid to him including a minute's silence before the Derry Senior Football Championship quarter final between An Lúb and Dungiven on 8 September 2007, at the home of his local club, Watty Graham Park, Glen. A Na Piarsaigh Belfast GAC jersey was draped over his coffin before he was interred .

Northern Ireland Assembly
New assembly	MLA for Mid Ulster; 1998–2003	Succeeded by Geraldine Dougan
