= Geraldine Dougan =

Irish politician

Member of the Northern Ireland Assembly for Mid-Ulster
- In office 26 November 2003 – 7 March 2007
- Preceded by: John Kelly
- Succeeded by: Michelle O'Neill

Personal details
- Born: 1973 (age 52–53)
- Party: Independent
- Other political affiliations: Sinn Féin (until 2007)
- Children: 5

Geraldine Dougan is a former Irish politician. She was elected in 2003 as a Sinn Féin Member of the Northern Ireland Assembly (MLA) for Mid Ulster She later became an Independent.

== Political career ==
On 1 January 2007, she announced that she would not be seeking re-selection for the 2007 Assembly election. In a statement on 4 January 2007, she said: "I have decided not to put my name forward for re-selection due to both personal reasons and concerns I have over the direction Sinn Féin is taking on the policing issue ... It has been reported that I remain a member of Sinn Féin ... While this is true at present, if a special ard fheis mandates Sinn Féin to support policing and the judiciary while still under British control in any shape or form, membership of that party would be untenable for me as an Irish republican."

She announced that she had resigned from Sinn Féin and became an Independent MLA effective on 15 January 2007. She did not stand at the 2007 assembly election.

Northern Ireland Assembly
Preceded by John Kelly	MLA for Mid-Ulster; 2003–2007	Succeeded by Michelle O'Neill
