= 1997 Coalisland attack =

IRA attack in Northern Ireland

- Part of the Troubles and Operation Banner
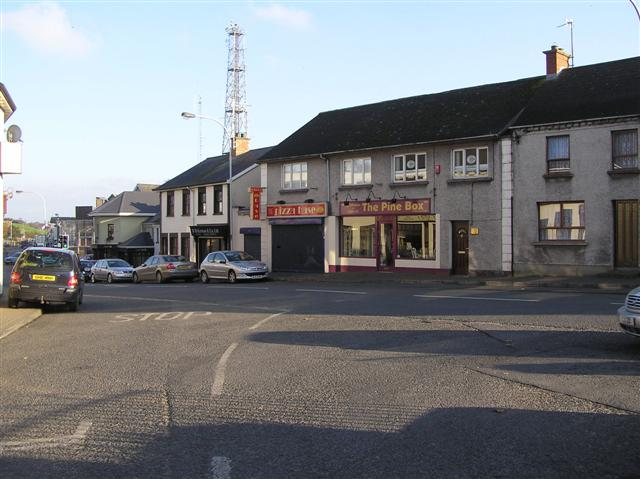
- Coalisland approaching from the east, with the former RUC base's radio masts in the background
Date	26 March 1997
Location	Coalisland, County Tyrone; Northern Ireland 54°32′23.20″N 6°42′07.28″W
Result	British Army/RUC base damaged Gareth Doris wounded and arrested

Belligerents
Provisional IRA; Coalisland residents	United Kingdom: British Army (SAS); RUC

Strength
2 IRA members	12 SAS soldiers

Casualties and losses
1 suspect wounded	None
- 2 civilians wounded by the RUC
- Location within Northern Ireland

On the evening of 26 March 1997, the Provisional Irish Republican Army (IRA) East Tyrone Brigade launched an improvised grenade attack on the fortified Royal Ulster Constabulary/British Army base in Coalisland, County Tyrone, Northern Ireland. The blast sparked an immediate reaction by an undercover Special Air Service unit, who shot and wounded Gareth Doris, an Irish republican and alleged IRA volunteer. The SAS unit was then surrounded by a crowd of protesters who prevented them approaching Doris or leaving. RUC officers arrived and fired plastic bullets at the crowd, allowing the special forces to leave the area.

== Previous incidents ==
The town of Coalisland in County Tyrone had a tradition of militant republicanism; five residents had been killed by British security forces before the first IRA ceasefire in 1994. In February 1992, four IRA volunteers were killed in a gun battle with the SAS during their escape after a machine-gun attack on the RUC/British Army barracks there. Three months later, an IRA bomb attack on a British Army patrol at Cappagh, in which a paratrooper lost his legs, triggered a series of clashes between local residents and British troops on 12 and 17 May. A number of civilians and soldiers were injured, a soldier's backpack radio destroyed and two British weapons stolen. The meleé was followed by a 500-strong protest in the town and bitter exchanges between Republic of Ireland and British officials. Further scuffles between civilians and soldiers were reported in the town on 6 March 1994.

== Incident at the RUC base ==
=== Bomb attack ===
At 9:40 pm on Wednesday 26 March 1997, a grenade was thrown at the joint British Army/RUC base at Coalisland, blowing a hole in the perimeter fence. The RUC reported that a 1 kg device hit the fence 10 feet (3.0 m) off the ground. Another source claimed that the device was a coffee-jar bomb filled with Semtex. The grenade was thrown or fired by two unidentified men. At the time of the attack there was an art exhibition at Coalisland Heritage Hall, also known as The Mill, from where the explosion and the gunshots that followed were clearly heard. The incident lasted one to two minutes.

=== Undercover operation ===
Just one minute after the IRA attack, bypassers heard high-velocity rounds buzzing around them. A number of men, apparently SAS soldiers, got out of civilian vehicles wearing baseball caps with "Army" stamped on the front. A source initially described them as members of the 14 Intelligence Company. The men were firing Browning pistols and Heckler & Koch sub- machine guns. Witnesses said there were eight to ten gunshots, while a republican source claimed that up to 18 rounds were fired. Nineteen-year-old Gareth Doris was shot in the stomach and fell to the ground. Doris was allegedly returning from the local church and was in the company of a priest when he was shot. A local priest, Seamus Rice, was driving out of the church car park when his car was hit by bullets, smashing the windscreen.

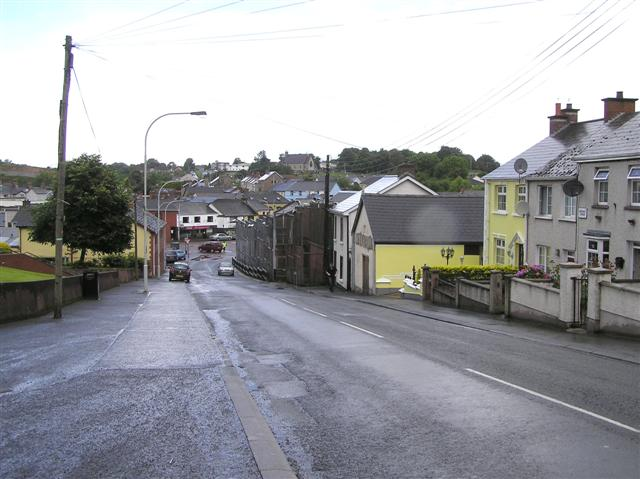
Platers Hill in Coalisland (2009), looking toward the town center and former RUC/Army base (middle)

Three minutes after the blast, hundreds of angry residents gathered at the scene and confronted the undercover soldiers. The soldiers fired live rounds at the ground and into the air to keep people back. The crowd kept drawing back and moving forward again until 9:50, when the RUC arrived and began firing plastic bullets at the protesters. Two women were wounded by plastic bullets and the undercover soldiers then fled in unmarked cars, setting off crackers or fireworks at the same time. Sinn Féin councillor Francie Molloy claimed that the protesters forced the SAS to withdraw, saving Doris's life in the process. Witnesses allegedly feared an undercover soldier brandishing a pistol would have killed the wounded Doris with a shot to his head.

Afterward, hundreds of residents were forced to leave their homes as security forces searched the area near the base. This kept tensions high, according to local republican activist Bernadette McAliskey. Two men were later questioned by the RUC about the attack.

== Aftermath ==
The attack—along with two large bombings the same day in Wilmslow, England—raised concerns that the IRA was trying to influence the upcoming UK general election. Martin McGuinness described the shooting as "murderous", while independent councillor Jim Canning said that more than a dozen soldiers "were threatening to shoot anybody who moved [...] while a young man lay shot on the ground". Republican sources claimed that this was another case of shoot-to-kill policy by the security forces; Ulster Unionist Party MP Ken Maginnis, however, praised the SAS for their actions.

Gareth Doris was admitted to South Tyrone Hospital in Dungannon, where he was arrested after undergoing surgery. He was later transferred to Musgrave Park military hospital in Belfast. Doris was later convicted for involvement in the bombing and sentenced to ten years in jail, before being released in 2000 under the terms of the Good Friday Agreement. Gareth was the cousin of Tony Doris, an IRA member killed in an SAS ambush in the nearby village of Coagh on 3 June 1991 and a cousin of Sinn Féin leader Michelle O'Neill. According to Sinn Féin councillor Brendan Doris, another cousin of Gareth, "He absolutely denies being involved in terrorist activity of any description". Amnesty International raised its concerns over the shooting and the fact that no warning was given beforehand.

DNA evidence collected in the area of the shooting led to the arrest of Coalisland native Paul Campbell by the PSNI in 2015, on the charges of being the other man with Doris during the attack. In February 2020 Campbell was convicted by a Diplock court in Belfast. Campbell denied the charges, but received a seven-and-a-half-year sentence. The prosecutor acknowledged that Campbell would have been released by that time under the provisions of the Good Friday Agreement, but argued that that was a decision for the parole commission, not the court.

On 5 July 1997, on the eve of the 1997 nationalist riots in Northern Ireland, the British Army/RUC base was the scene of another attack, when an IRA volunteer engaged an armoured RUC vehicle with gunfire beside the barracks. One female officer was wounded. The former RUC station at Coalisland was eventually shut in 2006 and sold for private development in 2010.

== See also ==
- Chronology of Provisional Irish Republican Army actions (1990–1999)
- Provisional IRA East Tyrone Brigade
- 1992 Coalisland riots
- Clonoe ambush
