= Houben centre bomb threat =

2022 bomb hoax in Belfast, Northern Ireland

The Houben centre bomb threat was a hoax bomb threat on 25 March 2022 in Belfast that caused the evacuation of a conference addressed by the Irish foreign Minister Simon Coveney, the disruption of a funeral in the adjacent church and the evacuation of houses in the area. It was condemned by politicians across the political spectrum in Northern Ireland.

== Events ==
On 25 March 2022, Minister for Foreign Affairs Simon Coveney was addressing the John and Pat Hume Foundation at the Houben Centre on the grounds of Holy Cross Church on the Crumlin Road. A van had been hijacked between 9 and 10 am in the Shankill area of the city. Two men had hijacked the van, one holding a gun to the driver's head and the other telling him "Listen, or you will be shot". The van was taken to Upper Charleville Street, where a suspected bomb was put in it. The gunmen took the driver's driving licence, threatened his family and warned him that a car would follow him to make sure he obeyed their orders. He was ordered to take the van to Holy Cross Church. He drove the van to the Houben Centre on Crumlin Road, then alerted police. The centre was evacuated and the suspect package was made safe by police, who determined it was a hoax.

== Aftermath ==
A funeral was halted at Holy Cross Church because of the threat. 25 homes had to be evacuated and residents of a nursing home were moved to another section of the building.

The driver of the hijacked van was taken to hospital because of shock. He was forced to leave his home after the hijacking.

The Ulster Volunteer Force is suspected of being behind the threat.

A forty-year-old man who owned a gym was arrested and charged with preparation of terrorist acts, hijacking and placing an article causing a bomb hoax by police, which he denied. Bail was refused in his case.

The two gunmen are still being sought.

== Reactions ==
The threats were widely condemned by people across the political spectrum, including Secretary of State for Northern Ireland Brandon Lewis, DUP leader Jeffrey Donaldson and Deputy First Minister of Northern Ireland Michelle O'Neill.

== Trial ==
In September 2026 Darren James Service from north Belfast pleaded guilty to charges of hijacking a Vauxhall Vivaro van and placing an item causing a bomb hoax at the Houben Centre on 25 March 2022. A senior Crown prosecutor said that plea was acceptable. Service was released on bail ahead of sentencing.
