= Year 13 =

Educational year group

Year 13 is an educational year group in schools in many countries including England and Wales, Northern Ireland and New Zealand. It is sometimes the thirteenth, fourteenth and final year of compulsory education, or alternatively a year of post-compulsory education.

== Australia ==
In certain Australian states, some schools will offer a 'Year 13' programme to students who wish to complete the usual one-year Year 12 programme over two years, or who were not successful in a sufficient number of subjects to attain the relevant Year 12 qualification on their first attempt. Year 13 students generally undertake standard Year 12 subjects alongside Year 12 students, and the majority of students will not undertake Year 13.

== New Zealand ==
In New Zealand, Year 13 is the second year of post-compulsory education. Students entering Year 13 are usually aged between 16.5 and 18. A student may stay in Year 13 until the end of the calendar year following their 19th birthday. Year 13 pupils are educated in secondary schools or in area schools.

Year 13 was previously known as the 7th form and students will be studying towards NCEA Level 3 and/or University Entrance.

== United Kingdom ==
=== England and Wales ===
In schools in England and Wales, Year 13 is the thirteenth year after Reception. It is normally the final year of Key Stage 5 in England and since 2015 it is compulsory to participate in some form of education or training in this year for students who finished Year 11 at an educational establishment in England. There is an exception to this if the individual is in full-time employment. Students who finished their secondary schooling at a Welsh establishment do not have to stay in education or training even if they are a resident of England.

Those aged 17 on 31 August will become part of Year 13 on the first working day after that date.

=== Northern Ireland ===
In Northern Ireland, Year 13 is the first year of post-compulsory education. Students in Year 13 are aged between 16 and 17. It usually forms part of a Sixth form or Sixth-form college.

=== Scotland ===
The term Year 13 is not used in Scotland; its equivalent is S6 (Secondary year 6).

Preceded by Year 12	Year 13; 17–18; 18–19	Succeeded by Year 14 or University
