= Killing of Chloe Mitchell =

2023 killing in Northern Ireland

Chloe Mitchell
- Born: 26 March 2002
- Died: c. 3 June 2023 (aged 21); Ballymena, County Antrim, Northern Ireland

On 3 June 2023, Chloe Louise Mitchell, a 21‑year‑old woman from Ballymena, Northern Ireland, disappeared in the town centre in the early hours of the morning, prompting a large‑scale search across the area. Her dismembered remains were found on 11 June, leading detectives to open a murder investigation.

Brandon John Rainey was charged with her murder and with attempting to prevent the lawful burial of a body. The trial began in November 2026.

== Background ==
Chloe Louise Mitchell was born on 26 March 2002, the youngest of six children of George and Georgina Mitchell. She lived in the Harryville area of Ballymena.

== Disappearance and discovery ==
Mitchell was last seen in Ballymena town centre in the early hours of 3 June 2023, when CCTV recorded her walking through the area. She was reported missing on 7 June, and police treated the case as a high-risk missing‑person investigation, carrying out searches across several parts of the town. During searches on 11 June, human remains were found in Ballymena, prompting detectives to open a murder investigation. On 26 June, it was confirmed that the remains were Mitchell's.

=== Vigils ===
A large crowd gathered in Ballymena on 14 June for a vigil held near the location where Mitchell had last been seen. Flowers and other tributes were placed at a temporary memorial in the park, and members of her family attended. One of her brothers addressed those present and expressed appreciation for the support offered by local residents, emergency services, and Community Rescue Service volunteers involved in the search. A separate vigil had taken place earlier at Belfast City Hall.

=== Funeral ===
A thanksgiving service for Mitchell took place on 29 June at her family home. A local minister led the gathering and described her as a much‑loved daughter and sister. He told those present that the community had come together to support the family "in their time of great need". A large number of people gathered in nearby King George's Park, where the service was relayed on a screen. A cortege left the family home after the service, led by a lone piper, and continued on to Ballee Cemetery for the burial.

=== Mural ===
A mural in Mitchell's memory was unveiled on Larne Street in Ballymena on the first anniversary of her death. The artwork, created and organised by local residents, is located close to the Mitchell family home. A large crowd attended the unveiling, including members of her family.

== Arrests and charges ==
Brandon John Rainey, aged 26, was arrested on 8 June 2023, and a 34‑year‑old man was arrested on 10 June. Following the discovery of suspected human remains on 11 June, both men were charged on 12 June; Rainey was charged with murder, and the other man with attempting to impede justice. During their appearance at Ballymena Magistrates' Court via video link, the court was told that Rainey had longstanding mental health difficulties, including a history of paranoid schizophrenia. The charge against the other man was later "withdrawn without prejudice". A further charge was subsequently brought against Rainey for attempting to prevent the lawful burial of a body.

== Trial ==
=== Opening statements ===
The trial began at Belfast Crown Court on 3 November 2026, when a jury of seven women and five men was sworn in. During the prosecution's opening statement the following day, the jury heard that Rainey and Mitchell had been in "an on-and-off relationship" and that the prosecution alleged he had killed her between 12:36 am and 5:18 am on 3 June 2023 before dismembering her body and placing her remains in wheelie bins. The prosecution said that, in the weeks before Mitchell's death, Rainey had purchased a number of knives and carried out online searches relating to Jack the Ripper.

The jury was told that Mitchell, who had experienced significant addiction problems, was last seen alive by two friends while with Rainey at his flat in James Street shortly before her death. It also heard that one of those friends later told police that Rainey had remarked that he would like to "chop someone up and melt them in the bath", before saying he was joking. According to the prosecution, after Mitchell went missing, Rainey told one of those friends that she had left his flat after an argument and gone to meet a man in Belfast.

The jury further heard that, after initially denying involvement in Mitchell's death during police interviews, Rainey allegedly gave several false accounts before telling a fellow prisoner while on remand that he had killed Mitchell and said that he knew how to dismember and dispose of her body because he had watched the television series Dexter. The court heard that Mitchell's remains were discovered in two bins in James Street on 11 June. Jurors were shown CCTV footage recorded at 5:18 am on 3 June showing a person making three trips while carrying a bulky object; the prosecution alleged that the figure was Rainey disposing of Mitchell's remains. The jury also heard that forensic examinations identified Mitchell's blood in several areas of Rainey's flat.

==== Post-mortem ====
State pathologist Dr James Lynas said that a post-mortem examination found that Mitchell died from blunt-force head injuries, possible gagging, and stab wounds to the chest. The examination also found around 55 stab wounds to her torso, some inflicted before death and others afterwards. Lynas said there was "little doubt that she had been the victim of a severe physical assault before her death".

=== Discovery of Mitchell's remains and forensic evidence ===
During evidence on 9 November, a police officer gave further details about the discovery of Mitchell's remains. He said that while making inquiries in James Street, a resident apologised for the smell coming from her bin, which he described as "putrid". After examining the resident's bin, the officer said that his suspicions, together with CCTV footage he had seen earlier, caused him to become concerned that the bin contained human remains. He then retraced the movements of a figure shown in the footage and located a second bin. A statement read to the court from the resident said she had noticed an unusual smell coming from her bin "but didn't think anything of it", and on checking inside, saw bin liners tied similarly to her own. She had poured bleach into it in an attempt to deal with the smell.

The court also heard a statement from a witness who had attended a barbecue with Rainey in the days before Mitchell's disappearance. The witness said they had overheard Rainey ask his mother whether she would still love him if he "dismembered 50 people and hid their parts". Jurors were also shown photographs of the interior of Rainey's flat taken after Mitchell's disappearance. An expert witness in biology and forensic science told the court that blood was identified in the living room, bedroom and bathroom of Rainey's flat, as well as on an outside electric meter box and doorframe, and that it matched Mitchell's DNA. Several knives were also found, along with an area of burnt debris outside. Mitchell could not be excluded as a possible contributor to a mixed DNA profile obtained from a hammer, while blood found on two knives did not match her DNA. The defence told the court that the expert's ability to assess how the samples came to be in their locations, or when the blood or DNA was deposited, was limited.

=== Jury discharged ===
On 10 November, Mr Justice Fowler discharged the jury and relisted the trial for 25 November, when a new jury is due to be sworn in. He did not give reasons for the decision, saying they would be provided after the conclusion of the trial. Fowler said that "matters" had been brought to his attention and that he had subsequently made inquiries, meaning the trial could not continue at that time.

== See also ==
- Murder of Natalie McNally
- Murder of Ashling Murphy
