= Killing of Thomas Mills =

1972 killing of a factory watchman

Thomas Mills
- Born: 1916; Ireland
- Died: 18 July 1972 (aged 55–56); Belfast, Northern Ireland
- Cause of death: Gunshot wound
- Occupation: Factory night watchman
- Spouse: Isabella Mills
- Children: 3

Thomas Mills (1916 – 18 July 1972), was a Protestant factory night watchman who was shot and killed by the British Army in July 1972. The British Army claimed he was killed by an IRA sniper but in 2019 that claim was proven false.

== Killing ==
On 18 July at Finlay's Packaging Factory in Ballygomartin and Moyard, at around 20:30, one of the factory's two night watchmen, Thomas Mills, let Rachel Sampson and her daughter Esther on the factory site so they could clean some of the offices.

At around 21:20, Rachel called out from the offices to tell Mills that were going to leave soon. Mills began to walk towards the offices, and while he was crossing a road way, a soldier of the King's Regiment known as M4 shot at him from a sangar on the roof of the Vere Foster School. Although the shot didn't directly hit him, the round ricocheted off the ground and caused shrapnel from the bullet and the tarmac to hit his right hand, another watchman, Norman Agnew, heard the shot and saw Mills look at his right hand and then drop. Another six shots were fired, one of which fatally struck him in the left arm, most likely severing his brachial artery or his radial or ulnar arteries.

== Aftermath ==
The British army first claimed Mills was killed by an IRA gunman in Moyard. Later M4 and M1 claimed that Mills fired a pistol first and that was when M4 opened fire on him.

47 years later in 2019 Mills' family revealed that the Historical Enquiries Team had confirmed that the army killed Mills not the IRA.

=== Paper Trail investigation ===
In 2021 Ciarán MacAirt of Paper Trail (Legacy Archive Research) uncovered the diary of a commander of the 39th Brigade written in July 1972. The diary further proved that Mills wasn't killed by the IRA but by the British army.

==== 2022 Inquest ====
In May 2022 an inquest was held, led by Joseph McCrisken, the inquest's findings showed that M4 and M1's accounts were inaccurate or even possibly fabricated. The inquest confirmed that Mills was unarmed and posed no threat, and that M4's use of force was a breach of the "Yellow Card" rules. The ex-soldier deemed responsible for Mills' killing fails to appear at the inquest.
