= Year 14 =

Educational year group in Northern Ireland

Year 14 is an educational year group in Northern Ireland. It is the second and final year of post-compulsory Sixth form education.

Commonly in England and Wales, students will re-apply to their sixth form after completing year 13 to study a fifteenth year of education if they are unable to obtain a university place or need to complete their A Levels. They are then referred to as being in Year 14.

Preceded by Year 13	Year 14; 17–18 (Northern Ireland)	Succeeded by Higher education or University
