= Michelle O'Neill =

First Minister of Northern Ireland since 2024

Michelle O'Neill MLA
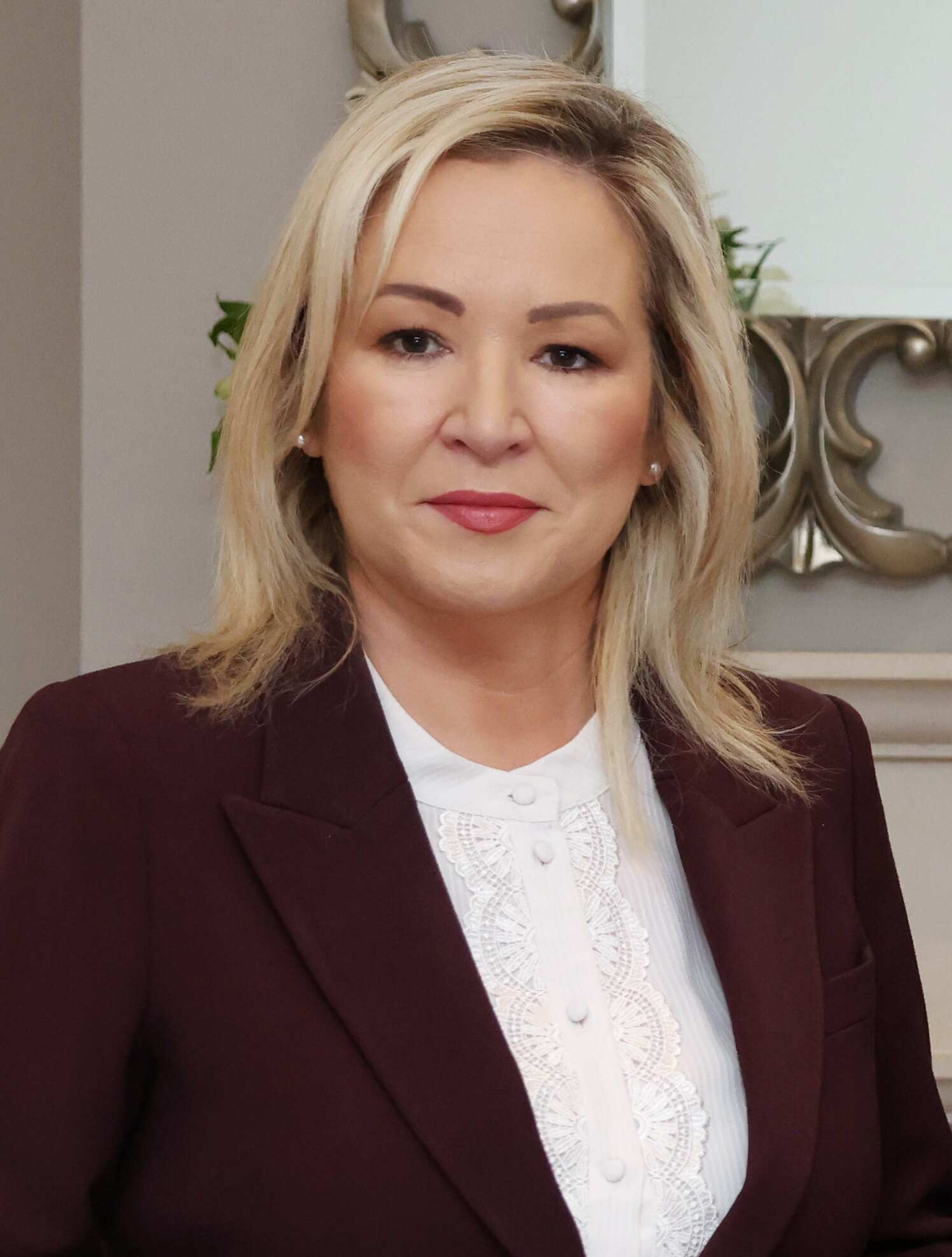
- O'Neill in 2026

First Minister of Northern Ireland
- Incumbent
- Assumed office 3 February 2024 Serving with Emma Little-Pengelly
- Preceded by: Paul Givan (2022)

Deputy First Minister of Northern Ireland
- In office 11 January 2020 – 4 February 2022 (Note: O'Neill left the role of dFM when Arlene Foster resigned as FM on 14 June 2021. She was reappointed dFM alongside FM Paul Givan on 17 June 2021.) Serving with Arlene Foster; Paul Givan
- Preceded by: Martin McGuinness (2017)
- Succeeded by: Emma Little-Pengelly (2024)

Vice President of Sinn Féin
- Incumbent
- Assumed office 10 February 2018
- President: Mary Lou McDonald
- Preceded by: Mary Lou McDonald
Cabinet offices and other roles 2005–2017
Minister of Health
In office 25 May 2016 – 2 March 2017
First Minister	Arlene Foster
Preceded by	Simon Hamilton
Succeeded by	Robin Swann
Minister for Agriculture and Rural Development
In office 5 May 2011 – 6 May 2016
First Minister	Peter Robinson; Arlene Foster
Preceded by	Michelle Gildernew
Succeeded by	Michelle McIlveen
Member of the Legislative Assembly for Mid Ulster
Incumbent
Assumed office 7 March 2007
Preceded by	Geraldine Dougan
Mayor of Dungannon and South Tyrone
In office June 2010 – June 2011
Preceded by	Francie Molloy
Succeeded by	Kenneth Reid
Member of Dungannon and South Tyrone Borough Council for Torrent
In office 5 May 2005 – 5 May 2011
Preceded by	Jim Canning
Succeeded by	Pádraig Quinn

Personal details
- Born: Michelle Doris; 10 January 1977 (age 49) Fermoy, County Cork, Ireland
- Party: Sinn Féin
- Spouse: Paddy O'Neill (m. 1995; sep. 2014)
- Children: 2
- Website: Official website
- ^aO'Neill left the role of dFM when Arlene Foster resigned as FM on 14 June 2021. She was reappointed dFM alongside FM Paul Givan on 17 June 2021.

Michelle O'Neill (née Doris; born 10 January 1977) is an Irish politician who has been First Minister of Northern Ireland since February 2024 and Vice President of Sinn Féin since 2018. She has also been an MLA for Mid Ulster in the Northern Ireland Assembly since 2007. O'Neill was previously deputy First Minister of Northern Ireland from 2020 to 2022. She served on the Dungannon and South Tyrone Borough Council from 2005 to 2011.

In 2007, she was elected to represent Mid Ulster in the Northern Ireland Assembly. She served as the first female Mayor of Dungannon and South Tyrone from 2010 to 2011. She has been serving as Vice President of Sinn Féin since 2018. In 2011, she was appointed to the Northern Ireland Executive by deputy First Minister Martin McGuinness as Minister for Agriculture and Rural Development. In 2016, she was promoted to Minister of Health. In January 2020, she became deputy First Minister of Northern Ireland after the New Decade, New Approach agreement restored the power-sharing executive.

O'Neill automatically relinquished her office following Paul Givan's resignation as first minister on 3 February 2022. Sinn Féin became the largest party after the 2022 Assembly election, putting O'Neill in line for the position of First Minister of Northern Ireland; however she did not take up the position until two years later because the Democratic Unionist Party (DUP) refused to nominate a deputy First Minister, citing its opposition to the Northern Ireland Protocol. On 3 February 2024, O'Neill was appointed First Minister of Northern Ireland. This marked the first time that an Irish nationalist had held the title of First Minister in Northern Ireland. (Note: Several Irish nationalists have held the title of deputy First Minister, which, despite the wording, holds the same powers as the First Minister.)

== Early life ==
O'Neill was born in Fermoy, a town in County Cork, Republic of Ireland. She comes from an Irish republican family in Clonoe, County Tyrone, Northern Ireland. Her father Brendan Doris was a Provisional IRA prisoner and Sinn Féin councillor. Her uncle Paul Doris is a former national president of the Irish Northern Aid Committee (NORAID). A cousin, Tony Doris, was one of three IRA members killed in an ambush by the Special Air Service in 1991. Another cousin, alleged IRA volunteer Gareth Malachy Doris, was shot and wounded during the 1997 Coalisland attack.

O'Neill attended St. Patrick's Girls' Academy, a Catholic grammar school in Dungannon, Tyrone. She subsequently began to train as an accounting technician, before pursuing a political career.

== Political career ==
=== Early career ===
O'Neill became involved in republican politics in her teens, assisting her father with constituency work in his role as a Dungannon councillor. She joined Sinn Féin after the Good Friday Agreement in 1998, at the age of 21, and started working as an advisor to Francie Molloy in the Northern Ireland Assembly. She kept this role until 2005, when she was elected to represent the Torrent electoral area on Dungannon and South Tyrone Borough Council, taking the seat that had been vacated by her father. O'Neill was elected as an MLA for Mid Ulster in the 2007 Assembly election, succeeding her Sinn Féin colleague Geraldine Dougan.

Whilst a backbencher in the Assembly, she sat on Stormont's education and health committees. In 2010, she became Mayor of Dungannon and South Tyrone. O'Neill was the first woman to hold the position of Mayor, as well as one of the youngest people. She held the council position until 2011.

=== Ministerial roles ===
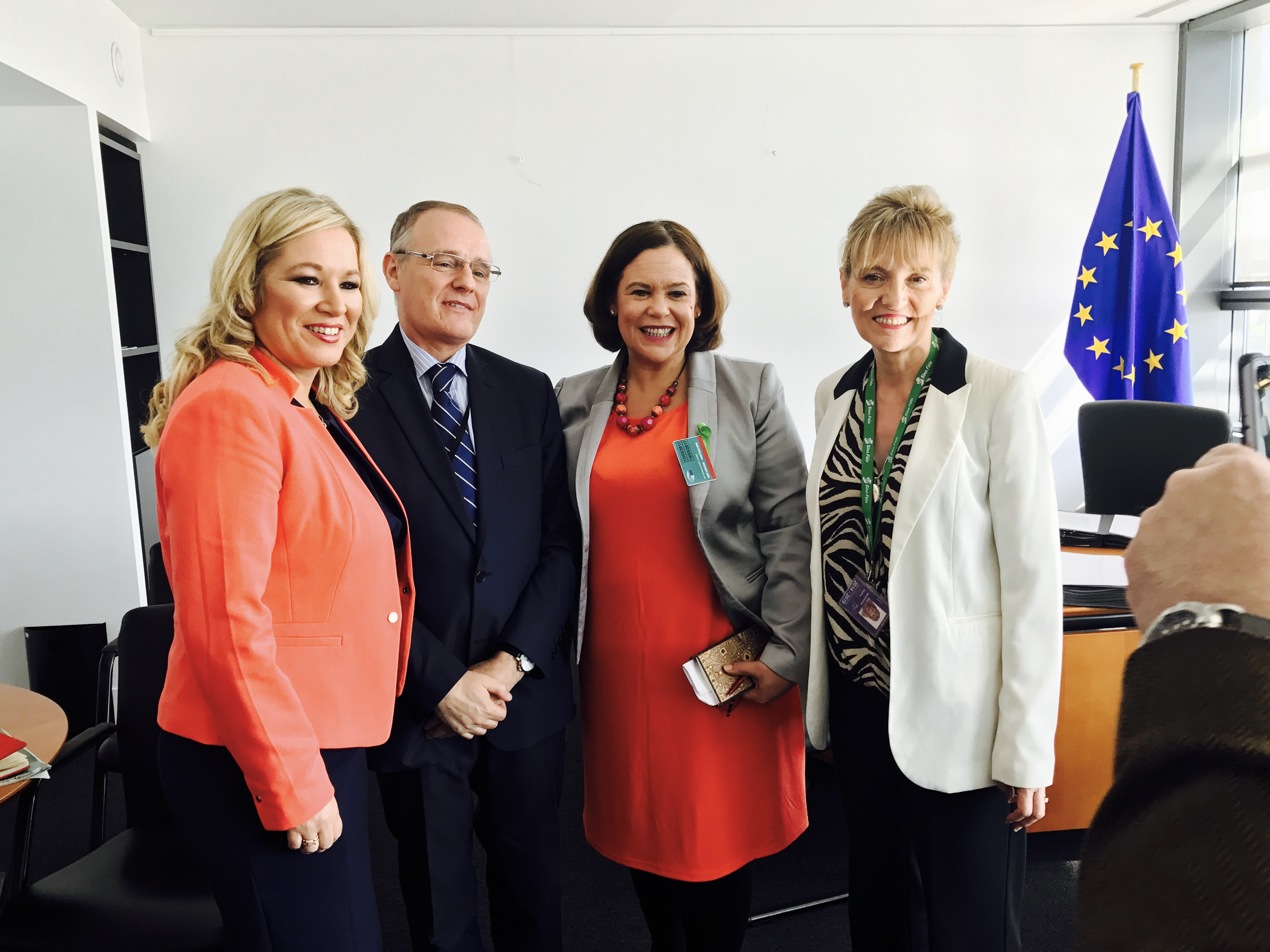
O'Neill (far left) at the European Parliament, 2017

O'Neill succeeded Michelle Gildernew as Minister for Agriculture and Rural Development in the Northern Ireland Executive after the 2011 Assembly election. One of her key decisions in the role was the relocation of the Department of Agriculture and Rural Development's headquarters from Belfast to a former British Army barracks in Ballykelly, County Londonderry in a bid to decentralise civil service jobs. The decision overruled an internal report on the matter, which recommended Strabane as a more appropriate location.

In December 2013, the High Court quashed a decision by O'Neill to reallocate 7% of Common Agricultural Policy funds to rural development projects that had been favoured by environmentalists. The court ruled that she was in breach of the Ministerial Code, having not sought the necessary permissions for the transfer from the Executive.

O'Neill replaced the DUP's Simon Hamilton as Minister of Health following the 2016 election. After eight days in office, she announced she would be scrapping the lifetime ban on gay and bisexual men donating blood in Northern Ireland. On 25 October 2016, O'Neill unveiled a document titled Health and Wellbeing 2026: Delivering Together, a ten-year plan which is based on the findings of the Bengoa Report and aims to modernise the health and social care system.

=== Vice President of Sinn Féin ===
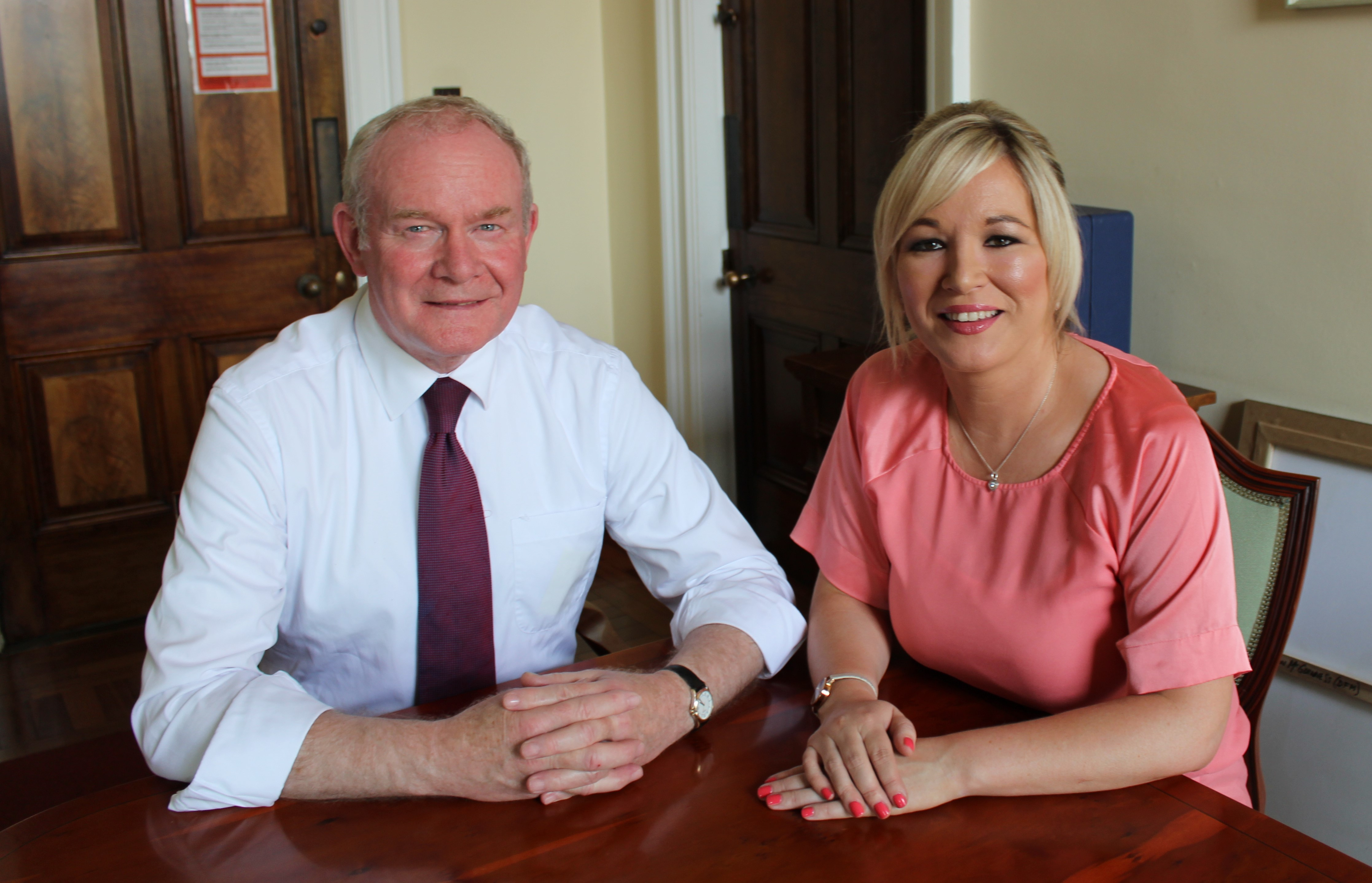
O'Neill with deputy First Minister Martin McGuinness in 2014

In January 2017, when Martin McGuinness resigned as deputy First Minister in protest at the Renewable Heat Incentive scandal, and said that he would not stand in the resulting snap election, O'Neill was chosen as Sinn Féin's new "party leader in the North". (Note: O'Neill has been variously described as Sinn Féin's leader in Northern Ireland, or leader in the Northern Ireland Assembly; Sinn Féin stated her title was "party leader in the North".) The fact that she was favoured for the leadership ahead of former IRA member Conor Murphy marked a notable break in the leadership's direct association with the organisation.

In the 2017 Assembly election that followed McGuinness's resignation, O'Neill was returned to the Assembly, topping the poll in Mid Ulster and with a 20.6% share of first-preference votes. In March 2017, she called for a referendum on the reunification of Ireland "as soon as possible" in response to Brexit. O'Neill led the Sinn Féin side in the inter-party negotiations that followed the election, aiming to restore a power-sharing coalition in Northern Ireland, but said at the end of March that the talks had failed and Sinn Féin would not nominate her for the position of deputy First Minister.

In February 2018, O'Neill became vice president of Sinn Féin, succeeding Mary Lou McDonald, who became president following the retirement of Gerry Adams. In November 2019 she faced a leadership challenge from John O'Dowd, winning with 67% of the vote.

=== Deputy First Minister of Northern Ireland ===
In January 2020, O'Neill was appointed deputy First Minister of Northern Ireland. She automatically lost her position on 14 June 2021 when Arlene Foster resigned as First Minister, and regained it three days later when she and Paul Givan were nominated as deputy First Minister and First Minister respectively on 17 June 2021. In February 2022, O'Neill once again lost her position as deputy First Minister with the resignation of Paul Givan as First Minister.

== First Minister of Northern Ireland ==
=== Designate (2022–2024) ===
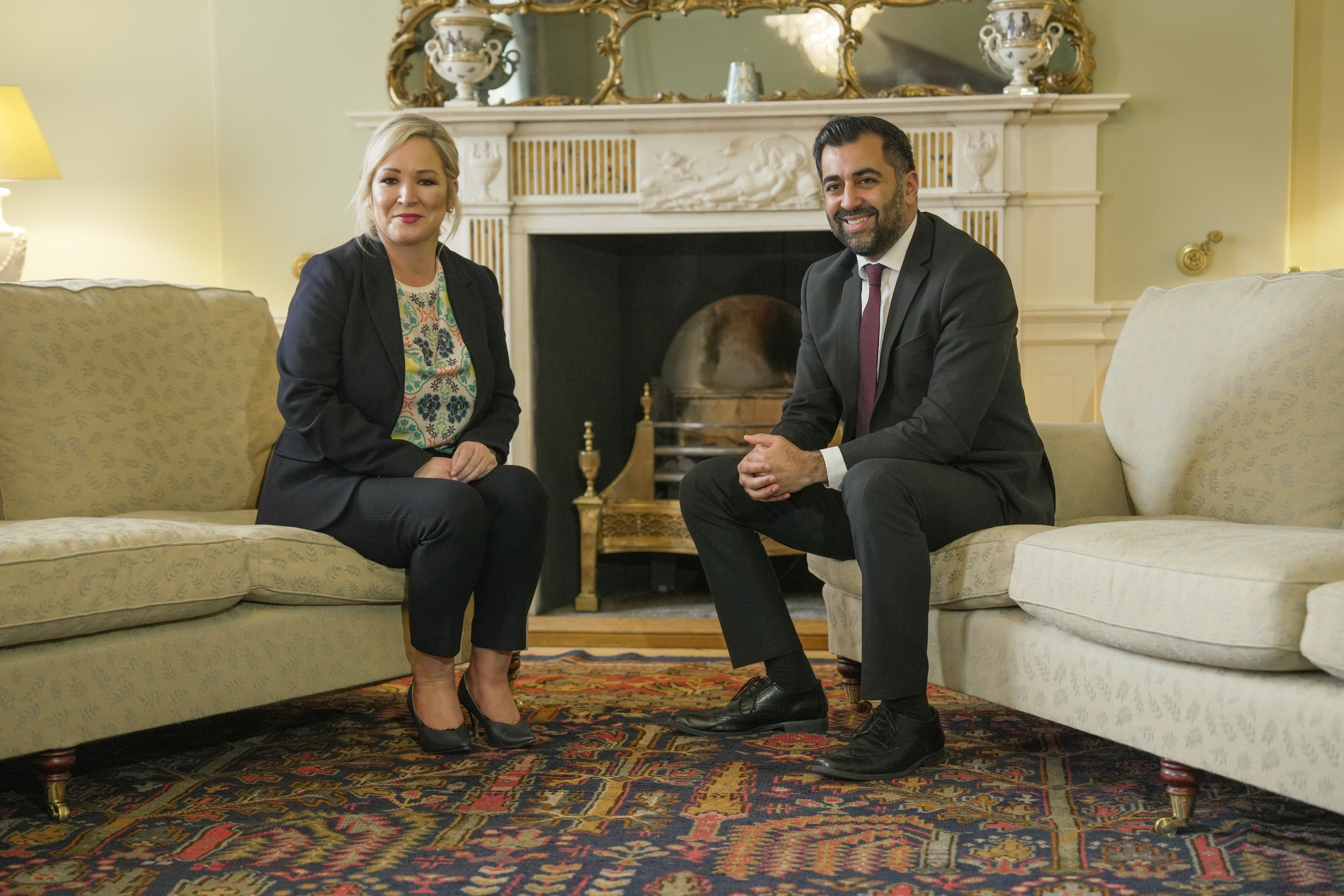
O'Neill, as First Minister designate, meets with First Minister of Scotland Humza Yousaf, November 2023.

Following the 2022 Assembly election, Sinn Féin won the largest number of seats with 27 seats, becoming the largest political party in the Northern Ireland Assembly. Their unionist counterparts, the Democratic Unionist Party (DUP) came second with 25 seats. As a result of being the largest party, this put O'Neill in line to become the First Minister of Northern Ireland and the DUP leader to become the deputy First Minister of Northern Ireland. However, O'Neill did not take up the position until February 2024 because, as part of its opposition to the Northern Ireland Protocol, the DUP refused to nominate a deputy First minister and there was therefore no functioning executive of Northern Ireland.

In August 2022, O'Neill was asked in a BBC interview whether it was right during The Troubles for the Provisional IRA "to engage in violent resistance to British rule". O'Neill was criticised for her response, including by then DUP leader Jeffrey Donaldson, when she said: "I think at the time there was no alternative, but now thankfully we have an alternative to conflict, and that is the Good Friday Agreement – that is why it's so precious to us all." She added in February 2024, "I think the alternative was the Good Friday Agreement, it was peace, and I'm so glad that we arrived at that position".

In September 2022, O'Neill broke with Republican tradition to attend the funeral of Queen Elizabeth II of the United Kingdom.

In May 2023, O'Neill attended the coronation of King Charles III, saying, "Well obviously I wanted to be here. We live in changing times and it was the respectful thing to do, to show respect and to be here for all those people at home, who I had said I would be a first minister for all. Attendance here is about honouring that and fulfilling my promise."

Under her leadership, Sinn Féin led most NI opinion polls for the 2024 United Kingdom general election.

=== Tenure (2024–present) ===
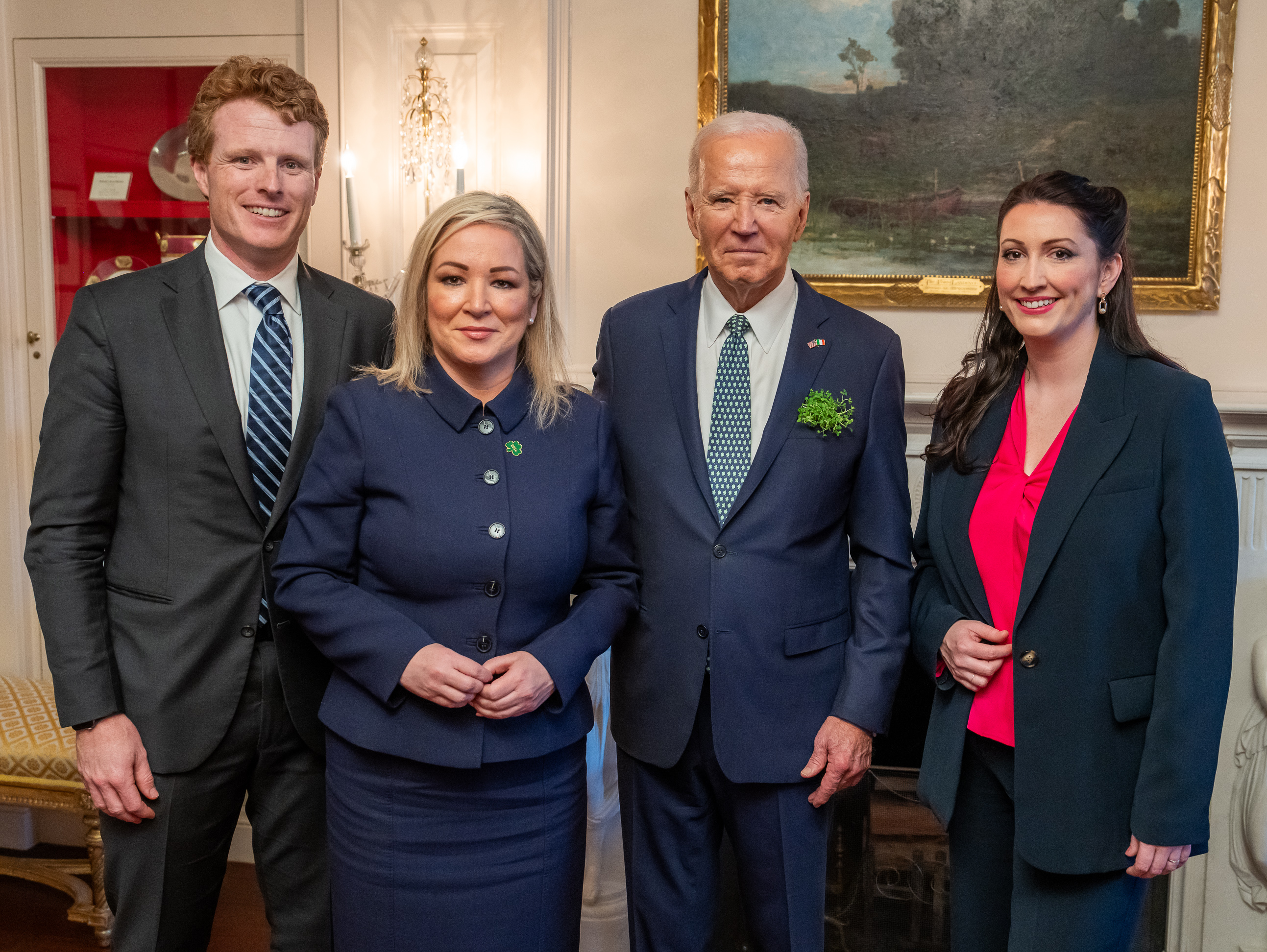
O'Neill (second from left) with US President Joe Biden, March 2024

On 30 January 2024, the Democratic Unionist Party announced their willingness to return to power-sharing. This paved the way for O'Neill, as nationalist leader to be sworn in as First Minister of Northern Ireland. O'Neill assumed office on 3 February 2024, becoming the first ever Irish nationalist, republican or Catholic to hold that position. In her Stormont acceptance speech, she again broke with republican tradition by using the term 'Northern Ireland'. She pledged in her speech to represent all and to show respect to the royal family. On 5 February, O'Neill held meetings with Rishi Sunak, Chris Heaton-Harris, Leo Varadkar and ministers of the Northern Ireland Executive. High on the agenda is the request for additional financial support for the Northern Ireland government in excess of the £3.3 billion package already pledged from the HM Treasury.

In November 2024, O'Neill became the first senior Sinn Féin figure to take part in an official Remembrance Sunday ceremony, laying a laurel wreath at the Belfast Cenotaph at City Hall. A banner was subsequently hung outside her office brandishing O'Neill a "traitor"; police investigated the incident as "hate-motivated".

In September 2026, O'Neill and Mary Lou McDonald joined a protest organised by the Garvaghy Road Residents' Coalition in Portadown. The protesters blocked the route of the Portadown District of the Orange Order, which had been granted permission by the High Court to march down the Garvaghy Road for the first time in 28 years. The district later said in a statement that it had made a formal complaint to the PSNI Chief Constable about O'Neill and McDonald, adding that faith in the law "continues to erode". The following month, the DUP blocked O'Neill from attending a National Economic Council meeting with Prime Minister Andy Burnham. It also said that Deputy First Minister Emma Little-Pengelly would not attend joint engagements with her and that O'Neill would not be permitted to undertake solo engagements.

==== Programme for government ====
As First Minister, O'Neill and deputy First Minister Emma Little-Pengelly published the Northern Ireland Executive's Programme for Government 2024–2027. It highlighted a number of immediate areas requiring priority, including developing a globally competitive and sustainable economy in Northern Ireland, the expansion of Early Learning and Childcare provision, reducing in healthcare waiting times, Additional Support Needs, increasing the available stock of social housing across Northern Ireland and public services reform.

==== Economy ====
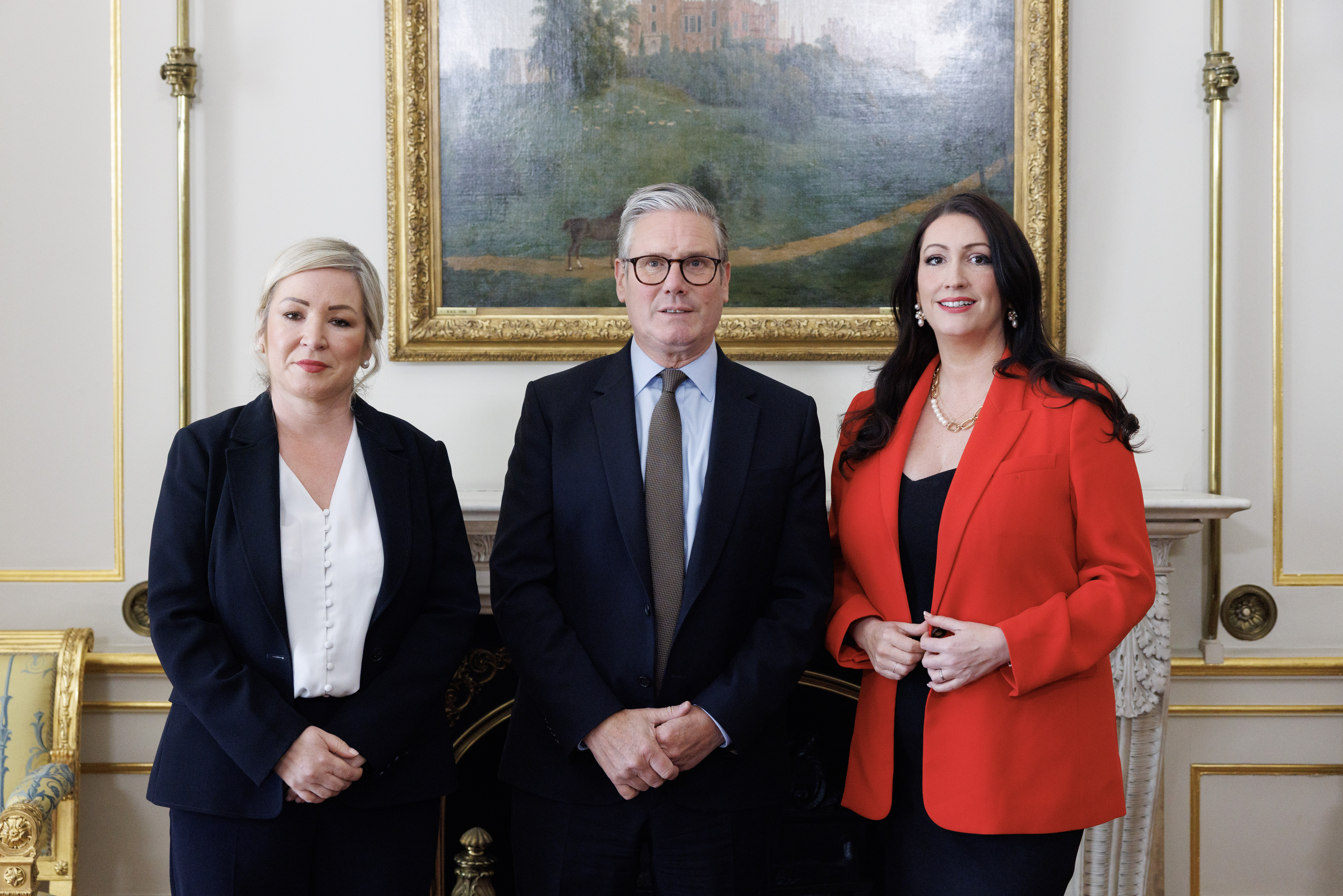
O'Neill (left) and Emma Little-Pengelly (right) with British Prime Minister Keir Starmer, 2024

The Northern Ireland Executive has pledged to support the delivery of the 80% renewable electricity by 2030 target by publishing a final design of a Renewable Electricity Support Scheme. The executive also confirmed that work would begin on the drafting of a new Employment Bill, and that Minister for the Economy within the executive and the trade board of Northern Ireland will conduct international visits to promote investment in Northern Ireland. O'Neill also confirmed that, subject to approval by the Northern Ireland Executive, work would begin in order to introduce a new Employment Rights act and a Good Work Charter to ensure better quality jobs and promote a healthy work-life balance across Northern Ireland.

==== Education ====
As First Minister, O'Neill has pledged for greater strength in the field of Research and Development by "enhancing engagement between universities and business" by pledging additional funding through the Higher Education Innovation Fund. The 2024 executive Programme for Government acknowledged that the "current education system is struggling to keep pace with the changing pupil profile" and acknowledged that the "model of support for children and young people needs significant transformation which requires additional investment". By 2027, the Northern Ireland Executive aims to have a "comprehensive executive agreed Special Educational Needs Reform Agenda and Delivery Plan in place" in order to ensure "improved outcomes for children, their families and the education workforce who support them".

== Libel action against John Carson ==
In May 2023, O'Neill pursued a libel action against former DUP councillor John Carson for defamation; this followed a comment he had made on social media in April 2021 and for which he later apologised. In November 2023, the High Court ruled, "no award of damages is payable" as her reputation remained intact. The court recognised the comment was "abusive, highly offensive and misogynistic" but concluded it fell short of being defamatory. Both parties were made responsible for their own legal costs amounting to over £12,000 for each litigant. Judge Bell concluded that it was a minor case, that should never have reached the High Court. Carson was suspended by his party for three months, when the local government commissioner for standards, found 'Mr Carson had breached the code of conduct for councillors' and they imposed a similar sanction.

== Personal life ==
O'Neill became pregnant at the age of 16 and gave birth to her daughter at the same age. She has said she was prayed over at school when she became pregnant. She married Paddy O'Neill when she was 18 and they have two children together. She separated from her husband in 2014. O'Neill became a grandmother in 2023.

== Electoral history ==
Northern Ireland Assembly elections

Year	Constituency	Party	First-preference votes	%	Result
2022	Mid Ulster	Sinn Féin	10,845	21.0	Elected
2017	Mid Ulster	Sinn Féin	10,258	20.6	Elected
2016	Mid Ulster	Sinn Féin	6,147	15.1	Elected
2011	Mid Ulster	Sinn Féin	5,178	11.9	Elected
2007	Mid Ulster	Sinn Féin	6,432	14.5	Elected

== Notes ==
Northern Ireland Assembly
Preceded by Geraldine Dougan	Member of the Legislative Assembly for Mid Ulster; 2007–present	Incumbent
Political offices
Preceded by Michelle Gildernew	Minister for Agriculture and Rural Development; 2011–2016	Succeeded by Michelle McIlveen as Minister of Agriculture, Environment and Rural Affairs
Preceded by Simon Hamilton as Minister of Health, Social Services and Public Safety	Minister of Health; 2016–2017	Vacant Office suspended Title next held by Robin Swann
Preceded by Mary Lou McDonald	Vice President of Sinn Féin; 2018–present	Incumbent
Preceded by Martin McGuinness	Deputy First Minister of Northern Ireland; 2020–2022	Vacant Title next held by Emma Little-Pengelly
Vacant Title last held by Paul Givan	First Minister of Northern Ireland; 2024–present	Incumbent
