= Northern Ireland peace process =

1990s events that ended most of the violence of the Troubles

Politicians at Waterfront Hall, Belfast discuss the peace process in 1998. From left to right: First Minister David Trimble, UK Prime Minister Tony Blair, US President Bill Clinton, Deputy First Minister Seamus Mallon and Lord Mayor of Belfast David Alderdice.

The Northern Ireland peace process includes the events leading up to the 1994 Provisional Irish Republican Army (IRA) ceasefire, the end of most of the violence of the Troubles, the Good Friday Agreement of 1998, and subsequent political developments.

== Timeline ==
=== Towards a ceasefire ===
In 1994, talks between the leaders of the two main Irish nationalist parties in Northern Ireland, John Hume of the Social Democratic and Labour Party (SDLP), and Gerry Adams of Sinn Féin (SF), continued. These talks led to a series of joint statements on how the violence might be brought to an end. The talks had been going on since the late 1980s and had secured the backing of the Irish government through an intermediary, the priest Alec Reid.

In November it was revealed that the British government had also been in talks with the Provisional IRA, although they had long denied it.

On Wednesday 15 December 1993, the Downing Street Declaration was issued by John Major, Prime Minister of the United Kingdom, and Albert Reynolds, Taoiseach, on behalf of the British and Irish governments. This included statements that:

- The British government had no "selfish strategic or economic" interest in Northern Ireland. This statement would lead, eventually, to the repeal of the Government of Ireland Act 1920.
- The British government would uphold the right of the people of Northern Ireland to decide between the Union with Great Britain or a united Ireland.
- The people of the island of Ireland, North and South, had the exclusive right to solve the issues between North and South by mutual consent.
- The Irish government would try to address unionist fears of a united Ireland by amending the Irish Constitution according to the principle of consent. This would lead, eventually, to the modification of the Articles 2 and 3.
- A united Ireland could only be brought about by peaceful means.
- Peace must involve a permanent end to the use of, or support for, paramilitary violence.

Ian Paisley of the Democratic Unionist Party (DUP) opposed the Declaration, James Molyneaux of the Ulster Unionist Party (UUP) argued that it was not a "sell-out" of unionists, and Gerry Adams of Sinn Féin requested dialogue with the governments and clarification of the Declaration.

=== Towards negotiations ===
On 6 April 1994, the Provisional IRA announced a three-day "temporary cessation of hostilities" to run from Wednesday 6 April – Friday 8 April 1994.

Five months later, on Wednesday 31 August 1994, the Provisional IRA announced a "cessation of military operations" from midnight. Albert Reynolds, the Irish Taoiseach, said that he accepted the IRA statement as implying a permanent ceasefire. Many unionists were skeptical. UUP leader James Molyneaux, in a rare slip, declared "This (the ceasefire) is the worst thing that has ever happened to us."

In the following period, there were disputes about the permanence of the ceasefire, whether parties linked to paramilitaries should be included in talks, and the rate of "normalisation" in Northern Ireland. Loyalist bombings and shootings, and punishment beatings from both sides, continued.

This is an abbreviated list of events of significance in the lead-up to all-party negotiations:

- 13 October 1994: The Combined Loyalist Military Command, representing the Ulster Volunteer Force, Ulster Defence Association and Red Hand Commandos announce a loyalist paramilitary ceasefire.
- Friday 15 December 1994: Albert Reynolds resigned as Taoiseach of the Republic of Ireland following the collapse of his Fianna Fáil/Labour coalition. He was succeeded by John Bruton, heading a "Rainbow Coalition" of Fine Gael, Labour and Democratic Left.
- Wednesday 22 February 1995: Framework Documents published:
  - A New Framework For Agreement, which dealt with north–south institutions, and
  - A Framework for Accountable Government in Northern Ireland, which proposed a single-chamber 90-member Assembly, to be elected by proportional representation and which was put directly to the electorate in 1997 by Conservative Party candidates standing in Northern Ireland at the general election.
    The proposals were not welcomed by unionists and the DUP described it as a "one-way street to Dublin" and a "joint government programme for Irish unity".
- Sunday 13 August 1995: Gerry Adams, Sinn Féin President, addressed a demonstration at Belfast City Hall. A member of the crowd called out to Adams to, "bring back the IRA". In reply Adams said: "They haven't gone away, you know".
- Friday 8 September 1995: David Trimble was elected leader of the UUP, replacing James Molyneaux.
- Friday 24 November 1995: a referendum in the Republic of Ireland to change the constitution to allow divorce was narrowly approved, with 50.2% in favour. Divorce had long been available north of the border. The ban in the Republic was sometimes cited by (mainly Protestant) unionists as evidence of excessive influence by the Catholic Church in the Republic which would (in the event of a United Ireland) represent a threat to the religious liberty of non-Catholics.
- Tuesday 28 November 1995: a joint communiqué by the British and Irish Governments outlined a "'twin-track' process to make progress in parallel on the decommissioning issue and on all-party negotiations". Preparatory talks were to lead to all-party negotiations beginning by the end of February 1996. US Senator George Mitchell was to lead an international body to provide an independent assessment of the decommissioning issue.
- Thursday 30 November 1995: Bill Clinton, then President of the United States, visited Northern Ireland, and spoke in favour of the "peace process" to a huge rally at Belfast's City Hall. He called terrorists "yesterday's men".
- Wednesday 20 December 1995: blaming the Provisional IRA for recent killings of drug dealers, the Irish government decided not to give permanent release to a further ten republican prisoners.
- Wednesday 24 January 1996: Dated 22 January, the report of the International Body on arms decommissioning (also known as the Mitchell Report) set out the six "Mitchell Principles" under which parties could enter into all-party talks, and suggested a number of confidence-building measures, including an "elective process". The main conclusion was that decommissioning of paramilitary arms should take place during (rather than before or after) all-party talks, in a "twin-track" process. The report was welcomed by the Irish government and the main opposition parties in Britain and the Republic, as well as the Social Democratic and Labour Party and the Alliance Party. It was accepted as a way forward by Sinn Féin and the Ulster Democratic Party (UDP), who both had paramilitary links. The moderate unionist party, the UUP, expressed reservations, and the more hardline DUP rejected it outright.
- Monday 29 January 1996: "Twin-track" talks began with the SDLP, the Progressive Unionist Party, and the UDP. The UUP declined the invitation.
- Friday 9 February 1996: one hour after a statement ending their ceasefire, the Provisional IRA detonated a large lorry bomb near South Quay DLR station in the London Docklands, killing two people, injuring 40, and causing £150 million worth of damage. The IRA ceasefire had lasted 17 months and 9 days. The IRA statement said that the ceasefire was ended because "the British government acted in bad faith with Mr Major and the unionist leaders squandering this unprecedented opportunity to resolve the conflict" by refusing to allow Sinn Féin into the talks until the IRA decommissioned its arms. Albert Reynolds, while not supporting the bombing, concurred with the IRA analysis. As Major's Government had lost its majority in Parliament and was depending on unionist votes to stay in power, it was widely accused of pro-unionist bias as a result. On the other hand, on the day of the bombing, Major had been preparing to meet with Sinn Féin representatives at Downing Street for the first time.

=== Towards another ceasefire ===
- Friday 16 February 1996: There was a large peace rally at City Hall, Belfast, and a number of smaller rallies at venues across Northern Ireland.
- Wednesday 28 February 1996: After a summit in London, the British and Irish prime ministers set a date (10 June 1996) for the start of all-party talks, and stated that participants would have to agree to abide by the six Mitchell Principles and that there would be preparatory 'proximity talks'.
- Monday 4 March 1996: Proximity talks were launched at Stormont. The Ulster Unionist Party and the Democratic Unionist Party refused to join, and Sinn Féin were again refused entry, ostensibly because of IRA violence.
- Thursday 21 March 1996: Elections to determine who would take part in all-party negotiations were announced. The elections would be to a Forum of 110 delegates, with 90 elected directly and 20 'top-up' seats from the ten parties polling the most votes.
- Thursday 18 April 1996: The Northern Ireland (Entry to Negotiations) Act was passed at Westminster. 30 parties and individuals were to take part in the election.
- Monday 20 May 1996: Gerry Adams, President of Sinn Féin, said that SF was prepared to accept the six Mitchell Principles, if the other parties agreed to them.
- Thursday 30 May 1996: In the Forum Elections, with a 65% turnout, the UUP won 30 seats, the SDLP 21, the DUP 24, Sinn Féin 17, the Alliance Party 7, the UK Unionist Party 3, the Progressive Unionist Party 2, the Ulster Democratic Party 2, the Northern Ireland Women's Coalition 2, and Labour 2 seats.
- Tuesday 4 June 1996: The Northern Ireland Office invited nine political parties to attend initial talks at Stormont. Again, Sinn Féin were not invited to the talks. Mary Robinson, then President of the Republic of Ireland, began the first official state visit to Britain by an Irish head of state.
- Friday 7 June 1996: IRA members killed Jerry McCabe, a Detective in the Garda Síochána (the Irish police service), during a post office robbery in Adare, County Limerick, in the Republic.
- Monday 10 June 1996: All-party negotiations (the 'Stormont talks') began in Stormont. Sinn Féin were again refused entry.
- Friday 14 June 1996: The Northern Ireland Forum met for the first time in Belfast. Sinn Féin declined to take part due to their policy of not taking seats in either the Westminster parliament or a regional "partitionist" Northern Ireland parliament (latter policy changed in 1998).
- Saturday 15 June 1996: The IRA exploded a bomb in Manchester, which destroyed a large part of the city centre and injured 212 people. Niall Donovan (28), a Catholic man, was stabbed to death near Dungannon, County Tyrone by the loyalist Ulster Volunteer Force (UVF).
- Thursday 20 June 1996: An IRA bomb factory was found by Gardaí in the Republic. In response the Irish government ended all contacts with Sinn Féin.
- Sunday 7 July 1996: As part of the ongoing Drumcree conflict, the Royal Ulster Constabulary (RUC) prevented a march by Portadown Orangemen from returning from Drumcree Church via the mainly nationalist Garvaghy Road. This decision was followed by widespread protest in the unionist community, and by rioting in unionist areas.
- Thursday 11 July 1996: Hugh Annesley, then Chief Constable of the RUC, reversed his decision and ordered his officers to allow the Orange march to pass along the Garvaghy Road in Portadown. No music was played as the parade passed the disputed area. This was followed by nationalist protests, and riots in republican areas.
- Saturday 13 July 1996: A republican car-bomb attack on a hotel in Enniskillen injured 17. The Continuity Irish Republican Army later claimed responsibility. The SDLP announced that it would withdraw from the Northern Ireland Forum.
- Monday 15 July 1996: A committee to review parades in Northern Ireland (the Independent Review of Parades and Marches) was announced.
- Thursday 30 January 1997: The Report of the Independent Review of Parades and Marches (The North Report) recommended setting up an independent commission to review contentious parades. Most nationalists welcomed the review but unionists attacked it as an erosion of the right to freedom of assembly. A period of "further consultation" was announced.
- Wednesday 5 March 1997: Stormont Talks adjourned until 3 June, to allow the parties to contest the forthcoming general election.
- Monday 7 April 1997: The Belfast Telegraph published the first of three articles over three days with results of an opinion survey it conducted in collaboration with Queens University. Survey questions were developed in cooperation with the 10 leading parties in Northern Ireland. Ninety-three per cent of Protestants and 97 per cent of Catholics said they "support the principle of a negotiated settlement for the political future of Northern Ireland," but only 25 per cent of Protestants and 28 per cent of Catholics believed the "Talks" would lead to a settlement.
- Sunday 27 April 1997: In Portadown Robert Hamill, a Catholic, was severely beaten in a sectarian attack by a gang of loyalists. Hamill later died from his injuries.
- Thursday 1 May 1997: A general election was held across the UK. The Labour Party won a majority and formed a government for the first time since 1979. In Northern Ireland, Sinn Féin had increased its share of the vote to 16%, becoming the third largest party in the region, and winning two seats: Gerry Adams and Martin McGuinness were their new MPs. The Ulster Unionist Party won 10 seats, the Social Democratic and Labour Party 3, the Democratic Unionist Party 2, and the UK Unionist Party 1.
- Monday 12 May 1997: Sean Brown, a 61 year old father of six from Bellaghy, County Londonderry, was abducted and murdered on May 12, 1997. An instructor at the Ballymena Training Centre, Mr Brown played an active role in the GAA.
- Friday 16 May 1997: Tony Blair, the new British Prime Minister, endorsed the Framework Documents, the Mitchell Report on decommissioning, and the criteria for inclusion in all-party talks. He stated that he valued Northern Ireland's place in the United Kingdom, and suggested that the Republic of Ireland should amend Articles 2 and 3 of its constitution, and indicated that officials would meet Sinn Féin to clarify certain issues.
- Wednesday 21 May 1997: In local government Elections the UUP remained the largest unionist party, and the SDLP the largest nationalist party, though they lost control of Belfast and Derry city councils respectively.
- Sunday 1 June 1997: Gregory Taylor, an off-duty RUC constable, died following a beating he received from a loyalist mob. It was later disclosed that Taylor had used his mobile phone to try to summon help from the local police station but no car was available to come to his aid.
- Tuesday 3 June 1997: The talks resumed at Stormont. The Loyalist Volunteer Force (LVF) and the Continuity Irish Republican Army (CIRA) were both proscribed.
- Friday 6 June 1997: There was a general election in the Republic of Ireland. The ruling coalition government of Fine Gael, Labour and Democratic Left was defeated by a coalition of Fianna Fáil, Progressive Democrats, and independent members. Sinn Féin won its first seat in the Dáil Éireann, since it had ended its policy of abstentionism in 1986.
- 16 June 1997 Two members of the RUC, Roland John Graham and David Johnston, are murdered in Lurgan.
- Wednesday 25 June 1997: The British and Irish governments gave the IRA 5 weeks to call an unequivocal ceasefire. 6 weeks later Sinn Féin would be allowed into the talks (due to resume on 15 September).
- Sunday 6 July 1997: The Orange Order parade at Drumcree was again permitted to go ahead, after a large operation by the RUC and British Army. This was followed by violent protests in nationalist areas.
- Saturday 12 July 1997: After an earlier decision by the Orange Order to reroute seven of their marches, the Twelfth parades across Northern Ireland passed off peacefully.
- Wednesday 16 July 1997: The DUP and the UKUP left the Stormont talks in protest at what they claimed was a lack of clarification by the British government on decommissioning.
- Friday 18 July 1997: John Hume and Gerry Adams issued a joint statement. Gerry Adams and Martin McGuinness called on the IRA to renew its ceasefire.
- Saturday 19 July 1997: The IRA announced the renewal of its 1994 ceasefire as of 12.00pm on 20 July 1997.

=== Towards agreement ===
- Tuesday 26 August 1997: The British and Irish governments jointly signed an agreement to set up an Independent International Commission on Decommissioning (IICD). U2 held a concert at Botanic Gardens, in Belfast, with an audience of around 40,000.
- Friday 29 August 1997: The Secretary of State for Northern Ireland, Marjorie Mowlam, accepted the IRA ceasefire as genuine and invited Sinn Féin into the multi-party talks at Stormont.
- Tuesday 9 September 1997: Representatives of Sinn Féin entered Stormont to sign a pledge that the party would abide by the Mitchell Principles.
- Thursday 11 September 1997: The IRA said that they "would have problems with sections of the Mitchell Principles", but that what Sinn Féin decided to do "was a matter for them".
- Thursday 11 September 1997: The Belfast Telegraph published the first of two articles over two days with results of a survey it conducted with Queens College. Survey questions were developed in cooperation with the leading parties in Northern Ireland. Ninety-two per cent of respondents (86 per cent of Protestants and 98 per cent of Catholics) said they wanted the party they support to stay in the Stormont talks.
- Monday 15 September 1997: Multi-Party Talks resumed. The Ulster Unionist Party, the Progressive Unionist Party, and the Ulster Democratic Party instead attended a special meeting at the UUP headquarters, and re-entered the talks on Wednesday.
- Wednesday 24 September 1997: Procedures were agreed at the Multi-party Talks, decommissioning of paramilitary weapons was sidestepped, and the Independent International Commission on Decommissioning was formally launched.
- Tuesday 7 October 1997: Substantive talks began at Stormont.
- Friday 17 October 1997: The Parades Commission was announced. Its membership and powers attracted criticism from unionists.
- Thursday 6 November 1997: Around 12 members of Sinn Féin resigned in protest at the acceptance of the Mitchell Principles.
- Sunday 9 November 1997: During a radio interview on the tenth anniversary of the Enniskillen bomb which killed 11 people on 8 November 1987, Gerry Adams said he was "deeply sorry about what happened".
- Saturday 27 December 1997: Inside the Maze Prison, members of the Irish National Liberation Army shot and killed Billy Wright, the Loyalist Volunteer Force leader.
- Saturday 10 January 1998: The Belfast Telegraph published the first of four stories over four days with results of an opinion survey it had conducted with Queens University. Questions were developed in cooperation with the major parties in Northern Ireland. Seventy per cent of Protestants said the most important step to ensure lasting peace would be to disband paramilitary groups; 78 per cent of Catholics said the most important step towards a lasting peace would be a bill of right guaranteeing equality for all.
- Friday 23 January 1998: The Ulster Freedom Fighters (UFF), a cover name for the Ulster Defence Association (UDA), reinstated their ceasefire. This was taken as an admission that they had been responsible for the murders of several Catholics.
- Monday 26 January 1998: The talks moved to Lancaster House in London. The UDP were barred from the talks, following UFF/UDA involvement in three more murders. The governments stated that the UDP could re-enter the talks if the UFF maintained its renewed ceasefire.
- Thursday 29 January 1998: Tony Blair, the British Prime Minister, announced a new inquiry into "Bloody Sunday" in Derry on 30 January 1972. This inquiry became known as the Saville Inquiry. The previous inquiry was widely regarded as a whitewash.
- Friday 20 February 1998: The British and Irish governments announced a 17-day exclusion of Sinn Féin from the talks because of IRA involvement in two killings in Belfast on 9 and 10 February 1998. Sinn Féin organised street protests over their exclusion.
- Monday 23 March 1998: Sinn Féin agreed to rejoin the talks, following the expiry of their exclusion a fortnight before, on 9 March.
- Tuesday 31 March 1998: The Belfast Telegraph published the first of four article over four days reporting results of a survey they conducted with Queens University. Survey questions were developed in cooperation with the leading parties in Northern Ireland. Seventy-seven per cent of respondents (74 per cent of Protestants and 81 per cent of Catholics) said they would vote 'yes' for an agreement supported by a majority of the political parties taking part in the talks.
- Wednesday 25 March 1998: The chairman of the talks, Senator George Mitchell, set a two-week deadline for an agreement.
- Friday 3 April 1998: The Bloody Sunday Inquiry, chaired by Lord Saville, an English Law Lord, opened.
- Thursday 9 April 1998: Talks continued past the midnight deadline. Jeffrey Donaldson, who had been a member of the Ulster Unionist Party talks team walked out, causing speculation about a split in the party.
- Good Friday, 10 April 1998: At 5.30pm (over 17 hours after the deadline) George Mitchell stated: "I am pleased to announce that the two governments and the political parties in Northern Ireland have reached agreement". It emerged later that President Clinton of the USA had made a number of telephone calls to party leaders to encourage them to reach this agreement.
- Saturday 15 August 1998: Omagh bombing by the Real IRA resulted in 29 deaths and hundreds of injuries. It was the worst single incident in Northern Ireland during the conflict.

The agreement, known as the Good Friday Agreement, included a devolved, inclusive government, prisoner release, troop reductions, targets for paramilitary decommissioning, provisions for polls on Irish reunification, and civil rights measures and "parity of esteem" for the two communities in Northern Ireland.

=== The referendum campaign ===
The agreement was to be approved by a referendum in Northern Ireland, and a separate referendum was to be held in the Republic to approve the necessary change to Articles 2 and 3 of the Constitution. The people of the Republic overwhelmingly endorsed the agreement, but the campaign in Northern Ireland was more controversial, and the result less predictable. The referendums were held on the same day, 22 May 1998.

The pro-agreement campaign framed the question as progress versus stalemate. The agreement was promoted to the nationalist community as delivering civil rights, inclusive government, recognition of their Irishness, and a peaceful route to Irish reunification. To the unionist community, it was presented as bringing an end to the troubles, a guaranteed end to paramilitaries and their weapons, and a guarantee of the Union for the foreseeable future. There was a massive government-funded campaign for the "Yes" vote, with large posters posted across Northern Ireland. One such poster featured five handwritten "pledges" by Prime Minister Tony Blair in an attempt to obtain the unionist "Yes" vote – this is despite the fact that none of the wording from these "pledges" was actually contained within the agreement that was being put to the electorate. These "pledges" were:

- No change to the status of Northern Ireland without the express consent of the people
- The power to take decisions to be returned from London to Northern Ireland, with accountable north–south co-operation
- Fairness and equality for all
- Those who use or threaten violence to be excluded from the government of Northern Ireland
- Prisoners to be kept in prison unless violence is given up for good

On the republican side, the "No" campaign seemed to concentrate on the purity of the republican ideal of complete and absolute independence from Britain. In this view, any compromise, however temporary, on the goal of Irish unity (or the right to pursue the armed struggle) was depicted as a betrayal of those who had fought and died for Ireland. Decommissioning of weapons and an end to paramilitary activity was portrayed as surrender to the British. The principle of consent was represented as a unionist veto, as it meant political progress would be almost impossible without unionist participation. It was pointed out that the agreement accepted partition. The state and its institutions would remain hostile to the republican community, claimed the critics. Despite these misgivings, the vast majority of republicans voted yes, with only some tiny unrepresentative parties (such as Republican Sinn Féin) on the nationalist side advocating a No vote.

On the unionist side, the "No" campaign was much stronger and stressed what were represented as concessions to republicanism and terrorism, particularly the release of convicted paramilitaries from prison (often those who had killed friends and relatives of unionist politicians and were serving "life" sentences), the presence of "terrorists" (by which they meant Sinn Féin) in government, the lack of guarantees on decommissioning, the perceived one-way nature of the process in moving towards a united Ireland, the lack of trust in all those who would be implementing the agreement, the erosion of British identity, the destruction of the Royal Ulster Constabulary, the vague language of the agreement, and the rushed nature in which the agreement was written.

It was widely expected that the nationalist community would endorse the agreement. As the vote approached, unionist opinion appeared divided into those who supported the agreement, those who opposed the agreement on principle, and those who welcomed agreement, but still had major misgivings about aspects like prisoner release and the role of paramilitaries and parties associated with them (particularly Sinn Féin). The fear among the Agreement's supporters was that there would not be a majority (or only a slim majority) of the unionist community in favour of the agreement, and that its credibility would be thereby undermined.

=== The votes ===
In the Republic of Ireland, the results of the vote to change the constitution in line with the agreement were:

Nineteenth Amendment of the Constitution of Ireland referendum
Choice	Votes	%
For	1,442,583	94.39
Against	85,748	5.61
Total	1,528,331	100.00
Valid votes	1,528,331	98.90
Invalid/blank votes	17,064	1.10
Total votes	1,545,395	100.00
Registered voters/turnout	2,747,088	56.26

In Northern Ireland, the results of the vote on the agreement were:

Northern Ireland Good Friday Agreement referendum, 1998
Choice	Votes	%
For	676,966	71.11
Against	274,979	28.89
Total	951,945	100.00
Valid votes	951,945	99.82
Invalid/blank votes	1,738	0.18
Total votes	953,683	100.00
Registered voters/turnout		81.1

There is no official breakdown of how the nationalist and unionist communities voted, but CAIN, the Conflict Archive on the Internet, estimated that the overwhelming majority (up to 97%) of members of the largely Catholic nationalist community in Northern Ireland voted 'Yes'. Their estimate of the largely Protestant unionist community's support for the agreement was between 51 and 53 per cent.

Complicating matters for the calculation was the turnout, with a substantial increase over elections in many traditionally unionist areas, whilst the turnout was close to that for elections in staunch nationalist areas. Approximately 147,000 more people voted in the referendum than in the subsequent Assembly elections, though it is estimated that there was also some deliberate abstentions by hardline republican voters.

The referendum was calculated centrally so it is not clear what the geographic spread of voting was, but an exit poll found that out of all eighteen constituencies, only Ian Paisley's North Antrim stronghold voted against the Agreement.

The pro-agreement result was greeted at the time with relief by supporters of the agreement. However, the scale of sceptical and anti-agreement sentiment in the unionist community, their continued misgivings over aspects of the agreement, and differing expectations from the Agreement on the part of the two communities were to cause difficulties in the following years.

=== Tensions and dissident threats ===
Although the peace process initially progressed mostly trouble-free, tensions escalated in 2001 with increasing sectarian conflicts, rioting, political disagreements and the decommissioning process. Real IRA bombs at the BBC and a commercial district in London threatened to derail the peace process. The Holy Cross dispute in north Belfast starting in June 2001 would become a major episode of sectarian conflict. Widespread rioting occurred in July, and that same month the loyalist Ulster Freedom Fighters (UFF) pulled out of the Good Friday Agreement whilst the Progressive Unionist Party (PUP) withdrew from the "current phase" of the peace process. On 26 July two hardline Ulster Unionist Party (UUP) MPs, David Burnside and Jeffrey Donaldson, both called for their party's withdrawal of supporting the new power-sharing Stormont assembly.

Much of the disturbances are thought to have been caused by the alienation of loyalists in the years following the Good Friday Agreement, who increasingly feared that the Agreement was largely in the Catholics' favour and that Irish unity was inevitable. Northern Ireland Secretary John Reid told unionists in a speech that they are "wrong" to think so, and that the Agreement would be a failure if Protestants no longer felt at home. The number of loyalist paramilitary shootings increased from 33 at the time of the Agreement to a peak of 124 in 2001/02.

On 9 September 2001 a gang of 15 Provisional IRA members kidnapped, tortured and shot two youths. Major loyalist rioting and violence broke out amid the Holy Cross dispute on 27 September. The next day, journalist Martin O'Hagan was killed by Loyalist Volunteer Force (LVF) members. On 13 October 2001, Reid declared the ceasefires of two loyalist paramilitary groups, Ulster Defence Association (UDA) and the LVF, to be over due to their violent shooting and rioting incidents. Sinn Féin leader Gerry Adams urged the Provisional IRA to disarm amid Stormont's near-collapse. In December 2001, two army watchtowers were attacked in South Armagh by republicans that caused many injuries. Throughout 2002 rioting and sectarian clashes continued, the most tense incident being the clashes in Short Strand.

On 6 May 2002 Progressive Unionist Party politician David Ervine said that continuing violence, doubts among loyalists and uncertainty about the IRA has left the peace process in a "substantial and serious crisis". On 14 October 2002, the Northern Ireland Assembly was suspended and direct rule from Westminster imposed.

=== Implementation ===
- The Northern Ireland Assembly made a good start. However, it was suspended several times mainly because of unionist anger at the IRA's refusal to decommission their weapons "transparently". Elections carried on nonetheless and voting polarised towards the more radical parties – the DUP and Sinn Féin. In 2004, negotiations were held to attempt to re-establish the Assembly and the Executive. These negotiations failed but the governments believed they were very close to a deal and published their proposed deal as the Comprehensive Agreement.
- Although the Royal Ulster Constabulary was renamed as the Police Service of Northern Ireland on 4 November 2001, Sinn Féin, the second-largest party, did not declare its acceptance of the Police Service of Northern Ireland until 28 January 2007 as part of the St Andrews Agreement. A 2005 survey indicates that 83% of the Northern Ireland population have "some", "a lot", or "total" confidence in the police's ability to provide a day-to-day policing service.
- No IRA weapons were decommissioned until October 2001, and the final consignment to be "put beyond use" was announced on 26 September 2005. There has also been allegations of IRA involvement in espionage at the Stormont Assembly (which prompted the UUP to collapse the Assembly), in training the Revolutionary Armed Forces of Colombia (FARC) guerillas, in several high-profile murders, and allegations of major robberies such as that of approximately £1 million of goods from a wholesaler and in excess of £26 million in the Northern Bank robbery.

=== Endgame ===
In January 2005, Robert McCartney was murdered after a pub brawl by IRA members. After a high-profile campaign by his sisters and fiancée, the IRA admitted its members were responsible and offered to meet them. The McCartney sisters turned down their offer, but the episode badly damaged the standing of the IRA in Belfast.

In April 2005, Gerry Adams called for the IRA to lay down its weapons. It agreed on 28 July 2005 calling for its volunteers to use "exclusively peaceful means". It would not disband, but simply use peaceful means to achieve its aims.

- Apart from some worn pistols from the Loyalist Volunteer Force, no other loyalist paramilitary group has decommissioned any of their weapons, and all have been involved in several murders, including major feuds, both internal and with other loyalist groups. Most Unionists maintain that the loyalist refusal is less of a stumbling block to the restoration of the assembly because, unlike the Provisional Irish Republican Army, parties with formal links to loyalist paramilitary groups do not have significant elected representation within the Assembly, despite their high levels of support. Throughout their existence, loyalist paramilitaries have been described by some (including Taoiseach Albert Reynolds) as "reactionary", i.e., that they respond to the attacks of republican groups, and some commentators claim that if there were no violent republican activity, loyalist violence would cease to exist. Others contend that these claims of solely "reactionary" loyalist attacks are hard to square with the emergence of militant loyalism in the civil rights era (i.e., when the IRA was dormant), and their preference for attacks on Catholics with no paramilitary connections, rather than attacking the more dangerous members of republican organisations. In the event that full transparent decommissioning by republican paramilitaries is completed, then it is widely expected by political commentators that loyalist paramilitary organisations would be put under heavy pressure to follow suit.
- While killings and bombings have been almost eliminated, "lower level" violence and crime, including "punishment" beatings, extortion and drug dealing continue, particularly in loyalist areas. Paramilitary organisations are still perceived to have considerable control in some areas, particularly the less affluent. Details of the perceived current level of activity by paramilitary organisations were published in a 2005 report by the Independent Monitoring Commission.

On 28 July 2005, the IRA announced the end of its armed campaign, and committed to the complete decommissioning of all its weapons, which was to be witnessed by both Catholic and Protestant clergymen. The statement was first read by veteran IRA militant Séanna Walsh in a video released to the public and contained the following text:

The leadership of Óglaigh na hÉireann has formally ordered an end to the armed campaign. This will take effect from 4pm this afternoon.
All IRA units have been ordered to dump arms. All Volunteers have been instructed to assist the development of purely political and democratic programmes through exclusively peaceful means. Volunteers must not engage in any other activities whatsoever.
The IRA leadership has also authorised our representative to engage with the IICD to complete the process to verifiably put its arms beyond use in a way which will further enhance public confidence and to conclude this as quickly as possible.
We have invited two independent witnesses, from the Protestant and Catholic churches, to testify to this.
The Army Council took these decisions following an unprecedented internal discussion and consultation process with IRA units and Volunteers.
We appreciate the honest and forthright way in which the consultation process was carried out and the depth and content of the submissions. We are proud of the comradely way in which this truly historic discussion was conducted.
The outcome of our consultations show very strong support among IRA Volunteers for the Sinn Féin peace strategy.
There is also widespread concern about the failure of the two governments and the unionists to fully engage in the peace process. This has created real difficulties.
The overwhelming majority of people in Ireland fully support this process.
They and friends of Irish unity throughout the world want to see the full implementation of the Good Friday Agreement.
Notwithstanding these difficulties our decisions have been taken to advance our republican and democratic objectives, including our goal of a united Ireland. We believe there is now an alternative way to achieve this and to end British rule in our country.
It is the responsibility of all Volunteers to show leadership, determination and courage. We are very mindful of the sacrifices of our patriot dead, those who went to jail, Volunteers, their families and the wider republican base. We reiterate our view that the armed struggle was entirely legitimate.
We are conscious that many people suffered in the conflict. There is a compelling imperative on all sides to build a just and lasting peace.
The issue of the defence of nationalist and republican communities has been raised with us. There is a responsibility on society to ensure that there is no re-occurrence of the pogroms of 1969 and the early 1970s.
There is also a universal responsibility to tackle sectarianism in all its forms.
The IRA is fully committed to the goals of Irish unity and independence and to building the Republic outlined in the 1916 Proclamation.
We call for maximum unity and effort by Irish republicans everywhere.
We are confident that by working together Irish republicans can achieve our objectives.
Every Volunteer is aware of the import of the decisions we have taken and all Óglaigh are compelled to fully comply with these orders.
There is now an unprecedented opportunity to utilise the considerable energy and goodwill which there is for the peace process. This comprehensive series of unparalleled initiatives is our contribution to this and to the continued endeavours to bring about independence and unity for the people of Ireland.

The IICD confirmed in its final report of September 2005 that the IRA had decommissioned all of its weapons.

Ian Paisley, George W. Bush and Martin McGuinness in December 2007

The definitive end of The Troubles and thus of the Peace Process came in 2007. Following the St Andrews Agreement of October 2006, and March 2007 elections, the Democratic Unionist Party and Sinn Féin formed a government in May 2007. In July 2007, the British Army formally ended Operation Banner, their mission in Northern Ireland which began 38 years earlier, in 1969.

On 8 December 2007, while visiting President Bush in the White House with the Northern Ireland First Minister Ian Paisley, Martin McGuinness, the Deputy First Minister, said to the press "Up until the 26 March this year, Ian Paisley and I never had a conversation about anything – not even about the weather – and now we have worked very closely together over the last seven months and there's been no angry words between us. ... This shows we are set for a new course."

=== Consultative Group on the Past ===
The Consultative Group on the Past was an independent group established to consult across the community in Northern Ireland on the best way to deal with the legacy of the Troubles.

The Group stated its terms of reference as:

To consult across the community on how Northern Ireland society can best approach the legacy of the events of the past 40 years; and to make recommendations, as appropriate, on any steps that might be taken to support Northern Ireland society in building a shared future that is not overshadowed by the events of the past.

— Consultative Group on the Past About Us, 28 January 2000

The Group was co-chaired by the Most Rev. Dr. Robin Eames (Lord Eames), the former Church of Ireland Archbishop of Armagh, and Denis Bradley, and published its report in January 2009.

Whilst the group met MI5 and the UVF, the Provisional IRA refused to meet with the group.

The Group published its recommendations on 28 January 2009 in a 190-page report, containing more than 30 recommendations, expected to cost in total £300m. The report recommended setting up a 5-year Legacy Commission, a Reconciliation Forum to aid the existing commission for victims and survivors, and a new historical case review body. The report concluded the Legacy Commission should make proposals on how "a line might be drawn", but omitted proposals for an amnesty. Additionally, it was proposed that no new Public Inquiries be held, and an annual Day of Reflection and Reconciliation and a shared memorial to the conflict. A controversial proposal to pay the relatives of all victims killed in the Troubles, including the families of paramilitary members, £12,000, as a "recognition payment", caused disruption to the report's launch by protesters. This estimated cost of this part of the proposal was £40m.

== See also ==
- Reconciliation theology in Northern Ireland
- Republic of Ireland
- Timeline of the Troubles
