= 2001 Belfast riots =

2001 Belfast riots may refer to:

- Holy Cross dispute
- July 2001 Belfast riots
- November 2001 Belfast riots
