= North/South Consultative Forum =

The North/South Consultative Forum is a planned civic forum on the island of Ireland envisioned as part of the Good Friday Agreement. The Forum is envisioned as an independent consultative forum appointed by the Government of Ireland and the Northern Ireland Executive "comprising the social partners and other members with expertise in social, cultural, economic and other issues" and being representative of civil society.

The Government of Ireland is in favour of the creation of the forum and, as part of the 2006 St. Andrews Agreement, the Northern Ireland Executive agreed to support its establishment. The establishment of the forum has been raised at every plenary meeting of the North/South Ministerial Council since 2007. Its creation, however, is delayed in part due to outstanding report to be prepared by the Northern Ireland Executive on the Civic Forum for Northern Ireland.

Ahead of the creation of the North/South Consultative Forum, the Government of Ireland convened three "North/South Consultative Conferences" in Farmleigh House in Dublin between October 2009 and January 2011. Participants were drawn from across civil society sectors in the Republic of Ireland and Northern Ireland.

At the 15 June 2012 plenary meeting of the North/South Ministerial Council (NSMC), the Council "noted the background and recent developments on the North South Consultative Forum and agreed to resolve this issue at the next NSMC Plenary." The date of the next meeting was set for 2 November 2012. At the November 2012 meeting the Council "noted the current position on a North South Consultative Forum and to agree[d] to review this issue at a future NSMC Plenary." A decision was further delayed at the July 2013 plenary. As of 2015, the issue is simply noted in joint communiqué as, "Ministers noted the current position on a North South Consultative Forum."

As of 2020, the Forum had still not been created.

== See also ==
- North/South Inter-Parliamentary Association
- British–Irish Parliamentary Assembly
- British–Irish Council
