= North/South Inter-Parliamentary Association =

- Formation: July 2012; 14 years ago
- Legal status: Joint committee
- Purpose: Interparliamentary relations
- Region served: Island of Ireland
- Official language: English, Irish

The North/South Inter-Parliamentary Association is an inter-parliamentary forum created between the national parliament of the Republic of Ireland (the Oireachtas) and the devolved Northern Ireland Assembly.

== Members ==
The forum is co-chaired by the Ceann Comhairle (speaker) of Dáil Éireann (lower house) in the Republic of Ireland and the Speaker of the Northern Ireland Assembly.

The association has 48 members, drawn equally from members of the Northern Ireland Assembly and the Oireachtas and meets twice annually on a rotational basis. An executive committee of 12 members, six each from the Oireacthas and the Northern Ireland Assembly, sets the agenda for each meeting.

== History ==
The association was envisioned as part of Strand 2 of the 1998 Good Friday Agreement, which dealt with the relationship between Northern Ireland, which is part of the United Kingdom, and the Republic of Ireland, which is an independent state. The two parts of Ireland were partitioned in 1920. Under the 1998 Agreement, the two jurisdictions agreed to "consider" an inter-parliamentary forum (and an independent civic forum) alongside the North/South Ministerial Council that was established under the agreement. In 2006, as part of the St Andrews Agreement, the Northern Ireland Executive agreed "[it] would encourage the parties in the [Northern Ireland] Assembly to establish" the forum.

The formation of the association was marked by a gathering of parliamentarians at Parliament Buildings, Belfast, Northern Ireland in July 2012. The first plenary meeting of the association took place on 12 October 2012 in the Seanad chambers of Leinster House, Dublin, Republic of Ireland. The inaugural meeting dealt with the topics of child protection and the Ulster Canal. The second plenary session took place on 26 April 2013 in Belfast.

== See also ==
- British–Irish Parliamentary Assembly
- North/South Ministerial Council
- North/South Consultative Forum
