= Nineteenth Amendment of the Constitution of Ireland =

Permitted the State to sign the Good Friday Agreement

Nineteenth Amendment of the Constitution
- 22 May 1998
- To permit the state to be bound by the British–Irish Agreement

Results
Choice	Votes	%
Yes	1,442,583	94.39%
No	85,748	5.61%
Valid votes	1,528,331	98.90%
Invalid or blank votes	17,064	1.10%
Total votes	1,545,395	100.00%
Registered voters/turnout	2,747,088	56.26%

The Nineteenth Amendment of the Constitution is an amendment of the Constitution of Ireland which permitted the state to be bound by the British–Irish Agreement (the bilateral portion of the Good Friday Agreement) and enabled the establishment of shared political institutions between Ireland and Northern Ireland. It also provided a mechanism for a further amendment to the Constitution upon a declaration by the government on the implementation of the Agreement, most notably by changing Articles 2 and 3 from the previous claim over the whole island of Ireland to an aspiration towards creating a united Ireland by peaceful means, "with the consent of a majority of the people, democratically expressed, in both jurisdictions in the island".

The amendment was effected by the Nineteenth Amendment of the Constitution Act 1998 (previously bill no. 24 of 1998) which was approved by referendum on 22 May 1998 and signed into law on 3 June of the same year. The referendum was held on the same day as a Northern Ireland referendum on the Good Friday Agreement and a second referendum in the Republic of Ireland to ratify the Treaty of Amsterdam. The Government declaration envisaged by the Nineteenth Amendment was made on 2 December 1999, bringing the changes to Articles 2 and 3 and certain other parts of the constitution into effect.

== Background ==
The Good Friday Agreement in 1998 was a culmination of the Northern Ireland peace process. The agreement acknowledged nationalism and unionism as "equally legitimate, political aspirations". It comprised two agreements: the Multi-Party Agreement, between the parties of Northern Ireland; and the British-Irish Agreement, between the government of Ireland and the government of the United Kingdom of Great Britain and Northern Ireland. The Constitution needed to be amended to allow the Irish state to be bound by its provisions.

The government of Ireland also agreed to amend Articles 2 and 3; however, these changes would only take effect if the government were satisfied that it could make a declaration that the Agreement had taken effect. These changes would remove the claim of the state to the whole island of Ireland, while also providing a mechanism for a poll on a united Ireland. The government of the United Kingdom agreed changes to legislation, which were to be provided in the Northern Ireland Act 1998, for a border poll on the status of Northern Ireland.

== Changes to the text ==
=== Initial changes after referendum (1998) ===
The Nineteenth Amendment added the text below as Article 29.7 to the constitution. Subsection 3° provides the detail of the amendments to be made to the text and are detailed further below. The text of subsections 3°, 4° and 5°, shown here in italics, are omitted from the published text of the Constitution.

1° The State may consent to be bound by the British-Irish Agreement done at Belfast on the 10th day of April, 1998, hereinafter called the Agreement.

2° Any institution established by or under the Agreement may exercise the powers and functions thereby conferred on it in respect of all or any part of the island of Ireland notwithstanding any other provision of this Constitution conferring a like power or function on any person or any organ of State appointed under or created or established by or under this Constitution. Any power or function conferred on such an institution in relation to the settlement or resolution of disputes or controversies may be in addition to or in substitution for any like power or function conferred by this Constitution on any such person or organ of State as aforesaid.

3° If the Government declare that the State has become obliged, pursuant to the Agreement, to give effect to the amendment of this Constitution referred to therein, then, notwithstanding Article 46 hereof, this Constitution shall be amended as follows:

[See further below for these changes]

4° If a declaration under this section is made, this subsection and subsection 3, other than the amendment of this Constitution effected thereby, and subsection 5, of this section shall be omitted from every official text of this Constitution published thereafter, but notwithstanding such omission this section shall continue to have the force of law.

5° If such a declaration is not made within twelve months of this section being added to this Constitution or such longer period as may be provided for by law, this section shall cease to have effect and shall be omitted from every official text of this Constitution published thereafter.

=== Subsequent changes effected upon Government declaration (1999) ===
Upon the declaration of the government on 2 December 1999, and under the terms of 29.7.3°, the following changes were made to the text:

Deletion of the entirety of Articles 2 and 3:

Article 2

The national territory consists of the whole island of Ireland, its islands and the territorial seas.

Article 3

Pending the re-integration of the national territory, and without prejudice to the right of the Parliament and Government established by this Constitution to exercise jurisdiction over the whole of that territory, the laws enacted by that Parliament shall have the like area and extent of application as the laws of Saorstát Éireann and the like extra-territorial effect.

and substitution of the Articles with the following:

Article 2

It is the entitlement and birthright of every person born in the island of Ireland, which includes its islands and seas, to be part of the Irish nation. That is also the entitlement of all persons otherwise qualified in accordance with law to be citizens of Ireland. Furthermore, the Irish nation cherishes its special affinity with people of Irish ancestry living abroad who share its cultural identity and heritage.

Article 3

1. It is the firm will of the Irish nation, in harmony and friendship, to unite all the people who share the territory of the island of Ireland, in all the diversity of their identities and traditions, recognising that a united Ireland shall be brought about only by peaceful means with the consent of a majority of the people, democratically expressed, in both jurisdictions in the island. Until then, the laws enacted by the Parliament established by this Constitution shall have the like area and extent of application as the laws enacted by the Parliament that existed immediately before the coming into operation of this Constitution.
2. Institutions with executive powers and functions that are shared between those jurisdictions may be established by their respective responsible authorities for stated purposes and may exercise powers and functions in respect of all or any part of the island.

Insertion of the following as Article 29.8 (see extraterritorial jurisdiction in Irish law):

The State may exercise extra-territorial jurisdiction in accordance with the generally recognised principles of international law.

== Bill ==
A lay litigant named Denis Riordan launched a High Court challenge to the bill the week before the referendum. He claimed the bill was invalid because it purported to allow a mechanism to amend the Constitution by government declaration rather than by referendum. The court rejected the challenge on the grounds that the initial amendment would be by referendum and that by separation of powers the courts could not interfere in the legislative process.

== Referendum result ==
Nineteenth Amendment of the Constitution of Ireland referendum
Choice	Votes	%
For	1,442,583	94.39
Against	85,748	5.61
Total	1,528,331	100.00
Valid votes	1,528,331	98.90
Invalid/blank votes	17,064	1.10
Total votes	1,545,395	100.00
Registered voters/turnout	2,747,088	56.26

Results by constituency
Constituency	Electorate	Turnout (%)	Votes		Proportion of votes	
Constituency	Electorate	Turnout (%)	Yes	No	Yes	No
Carlow–Kilkenny	86,584	56.2%	45,362	2,531	94.8%	5.2%
Cavan–Monaghan	83,141	60.8%	46,612	3,194	93.6%	6.4%
Clare	71,060	51.6%	34,089	2,023	94.4%	5.6%
Cork East	63,881	55.3%	33,582	1,275	96.4%	3.6%
Cork North-Central	72,802	53.4%	35,703	2,773	92.8%	7.2%
Cork North-West	47,402	59.1%	25,878	1,689	93.9%	6.1%
Cork South-Central	85,752	58.2%	46,596	3,001	94.0%	6.0%
Cork South-West	47,988	57.5%	25,591	1,604	94.2%	5.8%
Donegal North-East	52,188	56.0%	26,923	2,012	93.1%	6.9%
Donegal South-West	51,097	54.7%	25,919	1,693	93.9%	6.1%
Dublin Central	63,483	52.9%	31,232	1,998	94.0%	6.0%
Dublin North	65,312	60.7%	37,756	1,689	95.8%	4.2%
Dublin North-Central	65,737	65.1%	40,196	2,322	94.6%	5.4%
Dublin North-East	59,398	61.4%	34,347	1,985	94.6%	5.4%
Dublin North-West	59,332	59.3%	32,731	2,171	93.8%	6.2%
Dublin South	90,536	63.4%	54,727	2,431	95.8%	4.2%
Dublin South-Central	66,994	59.4%	36,945	2,515	93.7%	6.3%
Dublin South-East	62,663	59.7%	35,375	1,760	95.3%	4.7%
Dublin South-West	76,748	52.3%	37,475	2,382	94.1%	5.9%
Dublin West	68,773	56.2%	36,378	2,043	94.7%	5.3%
Dún Laoghaire	86,311	62.2%	51,161	2,244	95.8%	4.2%
Galway East	61,703	52.8%	30,577	1,465	95.5%	4.5%
Galway West	79,180	48.9%	36,302	2,014	94.8%	5.2%
Kerry North	51,641	50.8%	24,048	1,869	92.8%	7.2%
Kerry South	47,677	53.5%	23,540	1,550	93.9%	6.1%
Kildare North	54,104	54.4%	27,925	1,333	95.5%	4.5%
Kildare South	47,904	51.3%	22,958	1,359	94.5%	5.5%
Laois–Offaly	84,530	55.1%	43,176	2,773	94.0%	6.0%
Limerick East	77,884	54.3%	39,458	2,432	94.2%	5.8%
Limerick West	48,454	52.6%	23,634	1,422	94.4%	5.6%
Longford–Roscommon	63,968	56.2%	33,297	2,004	94.4%	5.6%
Louth	72,116	60.5%	40,664	2,607	94.0%	6.0%
Mayo	86,785	52.2%	42,264	2,248	95.0%	5.0%
Meath	92,053	54.2%	46,859	2,507	95.0%	5.0%
Sligo–Leitrim	64,538	57.1%	34,237	2,030	94.5%	5.5%
Tipperary North	53,368	57.4%	28,322	1,833	94.0%	6.0%
Tipperary South	51,439	58.0%	27,636	1,696	94.3%	5.7%
Waterford	69,793	54.2%	35,282	2,140	94.3%	5.7%
Westmeath	48,289	54.7%	24,488	1,529	94.2%	5.8%
Wexford	84,228	52.6%	40,810	2,938	93.3%	6.7%
Wicklow	80,252	57.0%	42,528	2,664	94.2%	5.8%
Total	2,747,088	56.2%	1,442,583	85,748	94.4%	5.6%

== After the referendum ==
The referendum returning officer certified the result in the High Court, which notified the Oireachtas, and the Nineteenth Amendment of the Constitution Act 1998 was signed into law by the President on 3 June 1998. This ipso facto effected the insertion of Article 29.7 of the Constitution and started the clock for the 12-month window (Article 29.7.5°) within which the British-Irish Agreement would be ratified. The British-Irish Agreement Act 1999 served in Irish law to ratify the treaty and establish the associated cross-border institutions. The act was signed into law on 22 March 1999 but would not be commenced by the Taoiseach until the same date as the corresponding British law (the Northern Ireland Act 1998). Both were dependent on participation of the parties in Northern Ireland.

Political disagreements within Northern Ireland meant that establishment would not take place by the deadline of 2 June 1999, so the Oireachtas rushed through a 12-month extension ("such longer period as may be provided for by law" in Article 29.7.5°). A minor amendment to the British-Irish Agreement was signed on 18 June and the British-Irish Agreement Act 1999 was accordingly amended on 25 June. The institutions were established on 2 December 1999, when the Irish government commenced the British-Irish Agreement Act 1999 as amended, and the UK government simultaneously commenced the Northern Ireland Act 1998. The Irish government accordingly made the declaration specified by Article 29.7.3°, triggering the replacement of Articles 2 and 3 of the Constitution, the insertion of Article 29.8, and the omission of the transitory subsections 3°–5° of Article 29.7.

== Later developments ==
The provision in the amended Article 2 quoted above that "It is the entitlement and birthright of every person born in the island of Ireland, which includes its islands and seas, to be part of the Irish nation" was affected by the Twenty-seventh Amendment of the Constitution of Ireland, passed in 2004. That amendment did not alter the text of Article 2 but instead inserted a new section in Article 9 which limited the constitutional right to citizenship by birth to individuals with at least one Irish-citizen parent.

== See also ==
- 1998 Northern Ireland Good Friday Agreement referendum
- Politics of the Republic of Ireland
- History of the Republic of Ireland
- History of Ireland
- Partition of Ireland
- Constitutional amendment
- 1998 Irish constitutional referendums
