= Civic Forum (disambiguation) =

Civic Forum may refer to:

- Civic Forum, a defunct political movement in Czechoslovakia
- Civic Forum (Central African Republic), a defunct political party in the Central African Republic
- Civic Forum for Northern Ireland, a consultative forum in Northern Ireland
- Guinean Civic Forum–Social Democracy, a political party in Guinea-Bissau
