= St Andrews Agreement =

October 2006 Northern Ireland political agreement

The St Andrews Agreement (Irish: Comhaontú Chill Rímhinn; Ulster Scots: St Andra's 'Greement, St Andrew's Greeance or St Andrae's Greeance) is an agreement between the British and Irish governments and Northern Ireland's political parties in relation to the devolution of power in the region. The agreement resulted from multi-party talks held in St Andrews in Fife, Scotland, from 11 to 13 October 2006, between the two governments and all the major parties in Northern Ireland, including the two largest, the Democratic Unionist Party (DUP) and Sinn Féin. It resulted in the restoration of the Northern Ireland Assembly, the formation (on 8 May 2007) of a new Northern Ireland Executive and a decision by Sinn Féin to support the Police Service of Northern Ireland, courts and rule of law.

== The agreement ==
Key elements of the agreement included the full acceptance of the Police Service of Northern Ireland (PSNI) by Sinn Féin, restoration of the Northern Ireland Assembly and a commitment by the Democratic Unionist Party (DUP) to power-sharing with Irish republicans in the Northern Ireland Executive. The government's plan envisaged the devolution of policing and justice powers within two years from the restoration of the Northern Ireland Executive. The parties were given until 10 November 2006 to respond to the draft agreement. The first and deputy first minister would be appointed on 24 November 2006. There was a target date of 26 March 2007 for a new executive to be up and running, after an election on 7 March 2007.

The Northern Ireland (St Andrews Agreement) Act 2006, which implemented the agreement, received Royal Assent on 22 November 2006. It was modified by the Northern Ireland (St Andrews Agreement) Act 2007.

== Reaction ==
Northern Ireland Secretary Peter Hain called the agreement an "astonishing breakthrough" on BBC Radio 5 Live. Taoiseach Bertie Ahern said that if the deadlines set by the two governments were not met, "the plan falters and there will be a move to plan B with no more discussions". Democratic Unionist Party leader Ian Paisley said: "Unionists can have confidence that its interests are being advanced and democracy is finally winning the day." He also said: "Delivering on the pivotal issue of policing and the rule of law starts now." Sinn Féin leader Gerry Adams said that the plans needed to be consulted on, but restoring the political institutions was an "enormous prize". Ulster Unionist Party leader Reg Empey described the agreement as the "Belfast Agreement for slow learners". Social Democratic and Labour Party leader Mark Durkan said welcome progress had been made towards restoring the power sharing institutions. Alliance Party leader David Ford said the outcome was a mix "of challenges and opportunities".

== 10 November deadline ==
The Joint Statement of 13 October stated that the governments had "asked parties, having consulted their members, to confirm their acceptance by 10 November". A Sinn Féin statement said that on 6 November "the Sinn Féin Ard Chomhairle mandated the party leadership to follow the course set out at St Andrews and to continue with the ongoing negotiations to resolve the outstanding issues" and that they "firmly believed that all of the outstanding difficulties can be resolved". The DUP statement said that "as Sinn Féin is not yet ready to take the decisive step forward on policing, the DUP will not be required to commit to any aspect of power sharing in advance of such certainty". Although neither statement constituted "acceptance" of the agreement, both governments maintained that there was sufficient endorsement from all parties to continue the process.

== 24 November deadline ==
The Joint Statement stated that "the Assembly will meet to nominate the First and Deputy First Minister on 24 November". In the days preceding the Assembly meeting the two governments said that it would be sufficient for the parties to "indicate" who their nominations for First and Deputy First Minister would be. When the Assembly met on 24 November, Ian Paisley said that "circumstances have not been reached that there can be a nomination or a designation this day", adding that "if and when commitments are delivered, the DUP would enter government". Gerry Adams nominated Martin McGuinness for the post of Deputy First Minister. Following the unexpected adjournment of the Assembly Paisley, in a statement, said: "Everyone already knows that in those circumstances after they are delivered I would accept the first minister's nomination." Both governments maintained that this was sufficient indication for the process to continue.

== 7 March deadline ==
The Northern Ireland (St Andrews Agreement) Act 2006 stated that following an election to the Assembly on 7 March 2007, ministerial offices to be held by Northern Ireland Ministers would be filled under the d'Hondt system on 26 March 2007. If the ministerial offices could not be filled on that date, the Act required the Secretary of State for Northern Ireland to make an order dissolving the Assembly, and the St Andrews Agreement would fall.

On 28 January 2007 a special Sinn Féin Ard Fheis approved a motion calling for devolution of policing and justice to the Assembly, support for the police services, the Garda Síochána and the PSNI and criminal justice system, the appointment of party representatives to the Policing Board and District Policing Partnership Boards, Sinn Féin Ministers taking the ministerial Pledge of Office, and actively encouraging everyone in the community to co-operate fully with the police services in tackling crime. At the same time, it mandated the Ard Chomhairle (National Executive) to implement the motion "only when the power-sharing institutions are established and when the Ard Chomhairle is satisfied that the policing and justice powers will be transferred. Or if this does not happen within the St Andrews time frame, only when acceptable new partnership arrangements to implement the Good Friday Agreement are in place."

The DUP gave a cautious welcome to the move, but without making any overt commitment on the devolution of policing and justice by May 2008. On 30 January, the Prime Minister and the Taoiseach confirmed that Assembly elections would go ahead as planned on 7 March.

In the Assembly elections, the DUP and Sinn Féin both gained seats, thus consolidating their position as the two largest parties in the Assembly. Peter Hain signed the order to restore the institutions on 25 March, warning that if the parties failed to reach agreement by midnight the following day, the Assembly would be closed down. Members of the DUP and Sinn Féin, led by Ian Paisley and Gerry Adams, met face-to face for the first time on 26 March, and agreed to form an executive on 8 May, with the DUP giving a firm commitment to enter government with Sinn Féin on that date. The agreement was welcomed by Tony Blair and Bertie Ahern. On 27 March, emergency legislation was introduced into the British Parliament to facilitate the six-week delay. The Northern Ireland (St Andrews Agreement No 2) Bill was passed without a vote in both the Commons and the Lords and received Royal Assent, as the Northern Ireland (St Andrews Agreement) Act 2007, the same evening.

== Implementation ==
Implementation of the St. Andrews Agreement
Measure	Implementation
Power sharing and the political institutions	The agreement contained a commitment to powersharing and the related political institutions, which was affirmed in the speeches given by the First Minister and the Deputy First Minister in May 2007.
Policing and the rule of law	The agreement included full support for the Police Service of Northern Ireland by Sinn Féin.
Human Rights, Equality, Victims and other issues	The agreement contained a programme of work relating to human rights, equality, victims and other related issues. This included a commitment to a "single equality bill" (Northern Ireland is not included in the territorial extent of the Equality Act 2010) and an Irish Language Act.
Financial package for the newly restored Executive	The agreement contained a commitment to a financial package for Northern Ireland. Financial commitments relating to Northern Ireland, beyond what the Barnett formula sets out were broken in 2010.
A statutory ministerial Code	The 2006 act amended the Northern Ireland Act 1998 to include a statutory ministerial code. This makes the Northern Ireland Executive the first, and as of 2021 only, government in the United Kingdom to have a statutory ministerial code.
Assembly referrals for Executive review	The 2006 act amended the Northern Ireland Act 1998 to allow that if 30 or more MLAs are unhappy with a ministerial decision, they can refer it back to the executive for review.
Amendments to the Pledge of Office	The 2006 act amended the Pledge of Office to include an endorsement of the police and courts.
Appointment of Ministers in the Executive	The 2006 act amended the Northern Ireland Act 1998 to require that the First Minister will normally come from the largest party within the largest designation. Unlike the text of the agreement, the act requires that the largest party chooses the First Minister no matter the size of their designation.
Functions of Office of First Minister and Deputy First Minister	The agreement contained a commitment to review if functions could be transferred from the Office of the First Minister and the Deputy First Minister to other departments, but this was not substantively acted upon.
Committee of the Centre	The 2006 act put the Committee of the Centre, which oversaw the Office of the First Minister and deputy First Minister, on a statutory basis.
Reviews	The 2006 act put established the Assembly and Executive Review Committee.
Repeal of the Northern Ireland Act 2000	The Northern Ireland Act 2000 was repealed by the 2006 act.
Community designation	The 2006 act amended the Northern Ireland Act 1998 to require that MLAs can only change their community designation if they change their political party affiliation.
Executive role in preparation for NSMC and BIC meetings	The 2006 act requires that the Executive Committee and Assembly are aware of the date and agenda of meetings of the North-South Ministerial Council and the British-Irish Council.
Attendance at NSMC and BIC	The 2006 act allows for ministers and junior ministers in the Executive to be able to attend the NSMC and BIC if an issue within the portfolio is within their portfolio.
Review	The Northern Ireland Executive and Irish Government, through of the NSMC, would appoint a "review group" to conduct a review of the efficiency of the implementation bodies.
Assembly/Oireachtas scrutiny of implementation bodies	The agreement included a commitment to require the leaders of North/South implementation bodies to attend briefings of Assembly committees and for the committees of the Oireachtas to have similar duties.
North-South Parliamentary Forum	The first meeting of the North/South Parliamentary Forum happened in the Slieve Donard Hotel, Newcastle, County Down.
Independent Consultative Forum	Main article: North/South Consultative Forum The agreement included a commitment to establish an independent North/South Consultative Forum including representatives from the different sections of society, including: business, the trade union movement, agriculture, and; the community and voluntary sector
Secretariat of British-Irish Council	The secretariat of the British Irish Council was agreed to be based in Edinburgh in 2010.
East-West Inter-parliamentary Framework	The agreement contained a commitment to "encourage" the British Parliament and the Oireachtas to approve an East-West inter-parliamentary framework.

== The final stage ==
Ian Paisley, George W. Bush and Martin McGuinness in December 2007

In the weeks following the agreement between Paisley and Adams, the four parties – the DUP, Sinn Féin, the UUP and the SDLP – indicated their choice of ministries in the Executive and nominated members to fill them. The Assembly met on 8 May 2007 and elected Ian Paisley and Martin McGuinness as First Minister and deputy First Minister. It also ratified the ten ministers as nominated by their parties. On 12 May the Sinn Féin Ard Chomhairle agreed to take up three places on the Policing Board, and nominated three MLAs to take them.

On 8 December 2007, while visiting President George W. Bush in the White House with the Northern Ireland First Minister Ian Paisley, Martin McGuinness, the deputy First Minister, said to the press: "Up until the 26 March this year, Ian Paisley and I never had a conversation about anything — not even about the weather — and now we have worked very closely together over the last seven months and there's been no angry words between us. ... This shows we are set for a new course."

== See also ==
- Northern Ireland peace process
- Belfast Agreement (Good Friday Agreement)
- The Journey - a 2016 dramatisation about the agreement process.
