= 1998 Irish constitutional referendums =

Two referendums were held together in the Republic of Ireland on 22 May 1998, each on a proposed amendment of the Irish constitution. Both measures were approved. A referendum in Northern Ireland was also held on the same day. The total number of people who voted (both countries) was 2,499,078.

== Eighteenth amendment ==
The Eighteenth Amendment introduced two new articles into the constitution which allowed the government to ratify the Amsterdam Treaty.

Eighteenth Amendment of the Constitution of Ireland referendum
Choice	Votes	%
For	932,632	61.74
Against	578,070	38.26
Total	1,510,702	100.00
Valid votes	1,510,702	97.85
Invalid/blank votes	33,228	2.15
Total votes	1,543,930	100.00
Registered voters/turnout	2,747,088	56.20

== Nineteenth amendment ==
The Nineteenth Amendment to the constitution allowed the government to ratify the Good Friday Agreement signed in Belfast on 10 April 1998, which included changing articles 2 and 3 of the Irish constitution which effectively claimed Irish sovereignty over Northern Ireland. The agreement was also endorsed in the simultaneous referendum in Northern Ireland. Articles 2 and 3 were subsequently changed in December 1999, and the territorial claim was replaced with an aspiration for a united Ireland to be achieved "by peaceful means with the consent of a majority of the people, democratically expressed, in both jurisdictions in the island".

Nineteenth Amendment of the Constitution of Ireland referendum
Choice	Votes	%
For	1,442,583	94.39
Against	85,748	5.61
Total	1,528,331	100.00
Valid votes	1,528,331	98.90
Invalid/blank votes	17,064	1.10
Total votes	1,545,395	100.00
Registered voters/turnout	2,747,088	56.26

== See also ==
- Constitutional amendment
- Politics of the Republic of Ireland
- History of the Republic of Ireland
- Politics of Northern Ireland
- History of Northern Ireland
