= Northern Ireland Civic Forum =

Consultative body in Northern Ireland

- Formation: 9 October 2000
- Dissolved: 4 October 2002
- Headquarters: Belfast
- Origins: Good Friday Agreement
- Region served: Northern Ireland
- Chair: Chris Gibson

The Northern Ireland Civic Forum was a consultative body in Northern Ireland created in 2000 under the Good Friday Agreement and consisting of members of various civil bodies. It had no legislative or governmental powers. It last met in 2002. In July 2025, the first and deputy first ministers proposed re-establishing the Civic Forum in a much smaller form.

== History ==
The Civic Forum was set up in October 2000. It was initially chaired by Chris Gibson. Other members included Gary McMichael.

The body was suspended along with the Northern Ireland Assembly in 2002. In June 2007, the Office of the First Minister and Deputy First Minister stated, "At this stage we are simply ascertaining how many of the current members are available and will decide then whether to recall them based on their responses."

In 2011, in response to questions in the Northern Ireland Assembly, the First Minister said:

Following the restoration of devolved powers in May 2007, the then First Minister and deputy First Minister considered the position of the Civic Forum in the re-established devolved arrangements and decided to commission a review of the effectiveness and appropriateness of its structure, operation and membership. The review was also to make recommendations on the most appropriate mechanism for engaging with civic society

....There was no widespread desire for a return to a structure of the size and expense of the Civic Forum as it had previously operated. Accordingly, there have been no meetings of the Civic Forum during this Assembly mandate, which has also resulted in considerable savings to the public purse.

...At the same time, I do not, in any way, want to leave the impression that we want to reduce the connection with our community. We want to continue having consultation. For instance, because of the economic downturn, the deputy First Minister and I brought together a group of stakeholders from across the community. We did that without those people getting or seeking any expenses, which indicates that people are willing to give their views without having elaborate and expensive structures.

In April 2013, the Assembly voted to recall the Civic Forum. A study of participants found that most welcomed this, although many argued that the forum should become smaller and have a clearer agenda. However, in November 2015, the Democratic Unionist Party and Sinn Féin agreed that, instead of reconvening the forum, they would establish a six member civil advisory panel. In July 2025, the first and deputy first ministers proposed re-establishing the Civic Forum in a much smaller form.

== Composition ==
Members were appointed from the following sectors:

- Agriculture and fisheries (3)
- Arts and sport (4)
- Business (7)
- Churches (5)
- Community relations (2)
- Culture (4)
- Education (2)
- Trade unionism (7)
- Victims of terrorism (2)
- Voluntary and community sectors (18)

In addition, there are three nominees of the First Minister of Northern Ireland and three of the Deputy First Minister.

== See also ==
- North/South Consultative Forum
