= Mitchell Principles =

Part of the Northern Irish peace process

The Mitchell Principles were six ground rules agreed by the Irish and British governments and the political parties in Northern Ireland regarding participation in talks on the future of the region. They were named for United States senator George Mitchell, who was heavily involved in the Northern Ireland peace process as the United States special envoy for Northern Ireland. All involved in negotiations had to affirm their commitment:

- To democratic and exclusively peaceful means of resolving political issues;
- To the total disarmament of all paramilitary organisations;
- To agree that such disarmament must be verifiable to the satisfaction of an independent commission;
- To renounce for themselves, and to oppose any effort by others, to use force, or threaten to use force, to influence the course or the outcome of all-party negotiations;
- To agree to abide by the terms of any agreement reached in all-party negotiations and to resort to democratic and exclusively peaceful methods in trying to alter any aspect of that outcome with which they may disagree; and,
- To urge that "punishment" killings and beatings stop and to take effective steps to prevent such actions.

Sinn Féin's acceptance of the principles was strongly criticised by more hardline republicans and led to resignations within the party as well as to formation of the 32 County Sovereignty Movement.
