= July 2001 Belfast riots =

Civil disorder in Belfast, Northern Ireland

- Date: 12 July 2001
- Location: Ardoyne, north Belfast, Northern Ireland

Casualties and losses
	113 RUC officers injured

On 12 July 2001, major rioting and civil disorder broke out in Ardoyne, north Belfast, Northern Ireland. In some of the worst rioting in years, 113 police officers were injured in clashes which followed a July 12 parade. Police were attacked when trying clear the path for about 100 Orangemen returning from the parade to go along a main road passing the Catholic Ardoyne area.

In the seven-hour riot which involved about 250 nationalist youth, two blast bombs and 263 petrol bombs were exploded, while a dozen vehicles were hijacked and 48 plastic bullets were shot by the police. Riot police also used water cannons. There were also incidents in east Belfast, Derry and Ballycastle, but the clashes in Ardoyne were by far the most serious.

It came just weeks after loyalist rioting in the area during the Holy Cross dispute.

== Aftermath ==
The Royal Ulster Constabulary (RUC) said that the Provisional Irish Republican Army orchestrated the riots - a claim denied by Sinn Féin, who believe the RUC's heavy response escalated tensions. The incident also intensified a row over the use of plastic bullets. 48 of them were fired by the RUC in Ardoyne, and Sinn Féin claimed 50 of them hit civilians, 10 of which were badly injured. Chief Constable Ronnie Flanagan strongly rejected calls from the Northern Ireland Human Rights Commission (NIHRC) to halt its use in riots. Nationalist politicians see the ban on plastic bullets as a vital reform to make Catholics trust the police force more. Gerry Kelly from Sinn Féin said: that the RUC "started the riot in Ardoyne. They are a sectarian force, using a very lethal weapon predominantly against nationalists and they should not be allowed to do so."

A few days later another riot involved petrol bombs and acid being thrown by loyalists at police in north and west Belfast. Loyalists claimed shots were fired at them from the Catholic Short Strand. A buffer zone was created by riot police in North Queen Street. Well-known Ulster Defence Association (UDA) members were spotted. From September 2001 the area would see fresh violence during the Holy Cross dispute and on the 23rd, with rioting also occurring in October and November.

== See also ==
- 1997 Northern Ireland riots
- Drumcree conflict
- 2001 South Armagh attacks
- 2002 Short Strand clashes
