= 2001 South Armagh attacks =

Riots in Northern Ireland

- Date: 9 December 2001
- Location: County Armagh, Northern Ireland

Parties
Police Service of Northern Ireland; British Army	Ógra Shinn Féin members and sympathisers

Casualties and losses
24 injuries	Unknown number of injuries

The 2001 South Armagh attacks were attacks on two watchtowers and a police station in South Armagh, Northern Ireland.

== History ==
On 9 December 2001, a group of 100 Irish republicans attacked two watchtowers and a police station in South Armagh, Northern Ireland. The mob first attacked the Creevekeeran watchtower with petrol bombs, iron bars and bottles. The crowd then attacked nearby Drummackavall watchtower in a similar assault before moving to the Crossmaglen police station, where they breached the entrance and fired missiles and petrol bombs at security forces. Twenty-one Police Service of Northern Ireland (PSNI) officers, three British Army soldiers and three police dogs were injured.

The riots followed a protest by members of Sinn Féin's youth wing dissatisfied with the slow process of demilitarisation promised by the British government, a key demand of Sinn Féin in the Northern Ireland peace process.

== Aftermath ==
The injured forces were airlifted to hospitals, one of whom suffered severe face burns. Four people from Belfast were arrested that night. The attack was condemned by assembly members including John Fee, but Sinn Féin's Conor Murphy claimed the mob had no weapons and were met with a "violent reaction" at Crossmaglen police station, where officers fired plastic bullets that injured some of them. Murphy also condemned the police's "bully boy" tactics.

A PSNI spokesman said the attack was a "well-orchestrated protest that was never intended to be peaceful". In a separate incident that day rioters attacked a car in north Belfast that injured an eight-year-old girl.

== See also ==
- Holy Cross dispute
- November 2001 Belfast riots
