= Labour – Federation of Labour Groups =

Collection of political organisations in Northern Ireland

Labour – Federation of Labour Groups is the formally registered name of a collection of political organisations in Northern Ireland who aspire to become part of the British Labour Party.

== Background ==
The British Labour Party did not organise or allow membership in Northern Ireland from the early 1920s until 2003 (although one of the earliest Labour Party conferences was held in Belfast in 1907). For many years this gap was filled by the Northern Ireland Labour Party which had links to the British party and, from 1949 was explicitly in favour of the Union between Northern Ireland and Great Britain. At the same time the Liberal Party and the Conservative Party had branches in Northern Ireland, the latter being the Ulster Unionists.

The Troubles led to a major realignment in the politics of Northern Ireland, with the Ulster Unionists breaking away from the Conservatives, and both Northern Ireland Labour and Liberals declined to virtual electoral insignificance. Many in both Northern Ireland and Great Britain began to campaign for the major British political parties to allow membership, organise and run for election in Northern Ireland, in the hope of bringing a further realignment that would move political discourse away from total domination by The Border Question.

In the case of the British Labour Party this campaign had long run up against the party's former policy that Northern Ireland should be given over to the Republic of Ireland and Labour's relations with the nationalist Social Democratic and Labour Party (SDLP). Labour maintained a ban on residents of Northern Ireland joining the party, despite allowing residents of anywhere else in the world the right to join. Despite this a number of activists formed local groups such as the South Belfast Constituency Labour Party or the Foyle Labour Group. These groups contested elections in the province as "Labour".

Legislation now requires political parties to formally register in order to use a party description on ballot papers. The local groups are formally registered as "Labour – Federation of Labour Groups".

In 2003 the trade unionist Andy McGivern initiated legal proceedings against the Labour Party, contending that the ban on membership breached the 1998 Human Rights Act. The Labour National Executive took legal advice and came to the conclusion that the courts would impose a change on the party; to pre-empt this the 2003 Labour Party Conference passed the appropriate rules changes to allow party membership.

However the Labour Party continued to refuse to organise in Northern Ireland, and so the local Labour groups continued their pressure. With the prospect of further legal action challenging the legality of the national party's decision, the Labour Party established an officially recognised branch in Northern Ireland in 2009.
