= Comprehensive Agreement =

The 'Comprehensive Agreement' is the name given to a proposed agreement between the Democratic Unionist Party (DUP) and Sinn Féin in Northern Ireland, which collapsed in failure in 2004. While those talks did fail, it was expected that the same principles, modifying and building on the Belfast Agreement would form the basis for a future deal in Northern Ireland.
