= November 2001 Belfast riots =

Civil disorder in Belfast, Northern Ireland

Large civil disorder broke out in north Belfast, Northern Ireland on Sunday 11 November 2001. The trouble started when republicans clashed with loyalists during a Remembrance Day service. Up to 400 Protestants and Catholics were involved in rioting in the afternoon on North Queen Street.

A 16-year-old Protestant teenager, Glen Hugh Branagh from Duncairn Gardens, was killed when a pipe bomb in his hand exploded prematurely. The Police Service of Northern Ireland (PSNI) believe that the bomb was intended at the riot police. Loyalists claimed it was thrown by republicans and he was merely throwing it away, a claim denied by Sinn Féin's Gerry Adams and the PSNI. A teenager and a man caught in the blast were also wounded. It later turned out that Branagh was a member of the Ulster Young Militants, the youth wing of the loyalist Ulster Defence Association (UDA) paramilitary group. The UDA's ceasefire was considered "over" in October following other violent riots or shootings orchestrated by its members.

24 PSNI officers and two British Army soldiers were injured and eight PSNI vehicles burnt. An 11-year-old boy was treated in hospital for a leg injury blamed on a plastic baton round from the police. The police called the riots the "worst in years".

In the evening disturbances, a 14-year-old Catholic girl was wounded when hit in the stomach by a plastic bullet, of which nine were fired by police. Catholics claimed two other youngsters were also hit. There were several shootings until the early hours of the morning, including a shooting at four youths from a car in Antrim Road and a shotgun incident in Eliza Street in central Belfast, though nobody was injured.

Rioting happened again on 16 and 17 November around Whitewell and Limestone Road between rival nationalists and loyalists. A number of civilians were injured and many petrol bombs and missiles were thrown, including in people's homes.

== See also ==
- Holy Cross dispute
- July 2001 Belfast riots
- 2001 South Armagh attacks
- 2002 Short Strand clashes
