= Good Friday Agreement =

1998 agreements between the UK and Ireland

Multi-Party Agreement
- Type: Multilateral agreement
- Signed: 10 April 1998
- Location: Belfast, Northern Ireland
- Effective: 2 December 1999
- Parties: Government of Ireland; Government of the United Kingdom; Parties in Northern Ireland
- Language: English

British–Irish Agreement
- Type: Bilateral international agreement
- Signed: 10 April 1998
- Location: Belfast, Northern Ireland
- Effective: 2 December 1999
- Original signatories: Tony Blair; Bertie Ahern; Mo Mowlam; David Andrews
- Parties: Republic of Ireland; United Kingdom
- Ratifiers: Government of Ireland; Government of the United Kingdom
- Language: English

The Good Friday Agreement or Belfast Agreement (Irish: Comhaontú Aoine an Chéasta or Comhaontú Bhéal Feirste; Ulster Scots: Guid Friday Greeance or Bilfawst Greeance) is a pair of agreements signed on 10 April (Good Friday) 1998 that ended most of the violence of the Troubles, an ethnic and national conflict in Northern Ireland since the late 1960s. It was a major development in the Northern Ireland peace process of the 1990s. It is made up of the Multi-Party Agreement between most of Northern Ireland's political parties, and the British–Irish Agreement between the British and Irish governments. Northern Ireland's present devolved system of government is based on the Agreement.

Issues relating to sovereignty, governance, discrimination, military and paramilitary groups, justice and policing were central to the Agreement. It restored self-government to Northern Ireland on the basis of "power sharing" and it included acceptance of the principle of consent, commitment to civil and political rights, cultural parity of esteem, police reform, paramilitary disarmament and early release of paramilitary prisoners, followed by demilitarisation. The Agreement also created a number of institutions between Northern Ireland and Ireland ("North–South"), and between Ireland and the United Kingdom ("East–West").

The Agreement was approved by voters across the island of Ireland in two referendums held on 22 May 1998. In Northern Ireland, voters were asked in the 1998 Northern Ireland Good Friday Agreement referendum whether they supported the multi-party Agreement. In the Republic of Ireland, voters were asked whether they would allow the state to sign the Agreement and allow necessary constitutional changes (Nineteenth Amendment of the Constitution of Ireland) to facilitate it. The people of both jurisdictions needed to approve the Agreement to give effect to it.

The British–Irish Agreement came into force on 2 December 1999. The Democratic Unionist Party (DUP) was the only major political group in Northern Ireland to oppose the Good Friday Agreement.

== History and process ==
When the Irish Free State was established in 1922 (under the Anglo-Irish Treaty of December 1921), six of the island's northern counties remained part of the United Kingdom. For Northern Ireland, the decades that followed were marked by tensions and controversies, sometimes spilling over into violence, between unionists who favoured remaining with Britain and nationalists who favoured unification with the Irish Free State (later the Republic of Ireland). Starting in the late 1960s, this conflict became more intense and more violent. In the ensuing period of over 30 years, over 3,500 deaths were attributed to these hostilities, which came to be known as the Troubles.

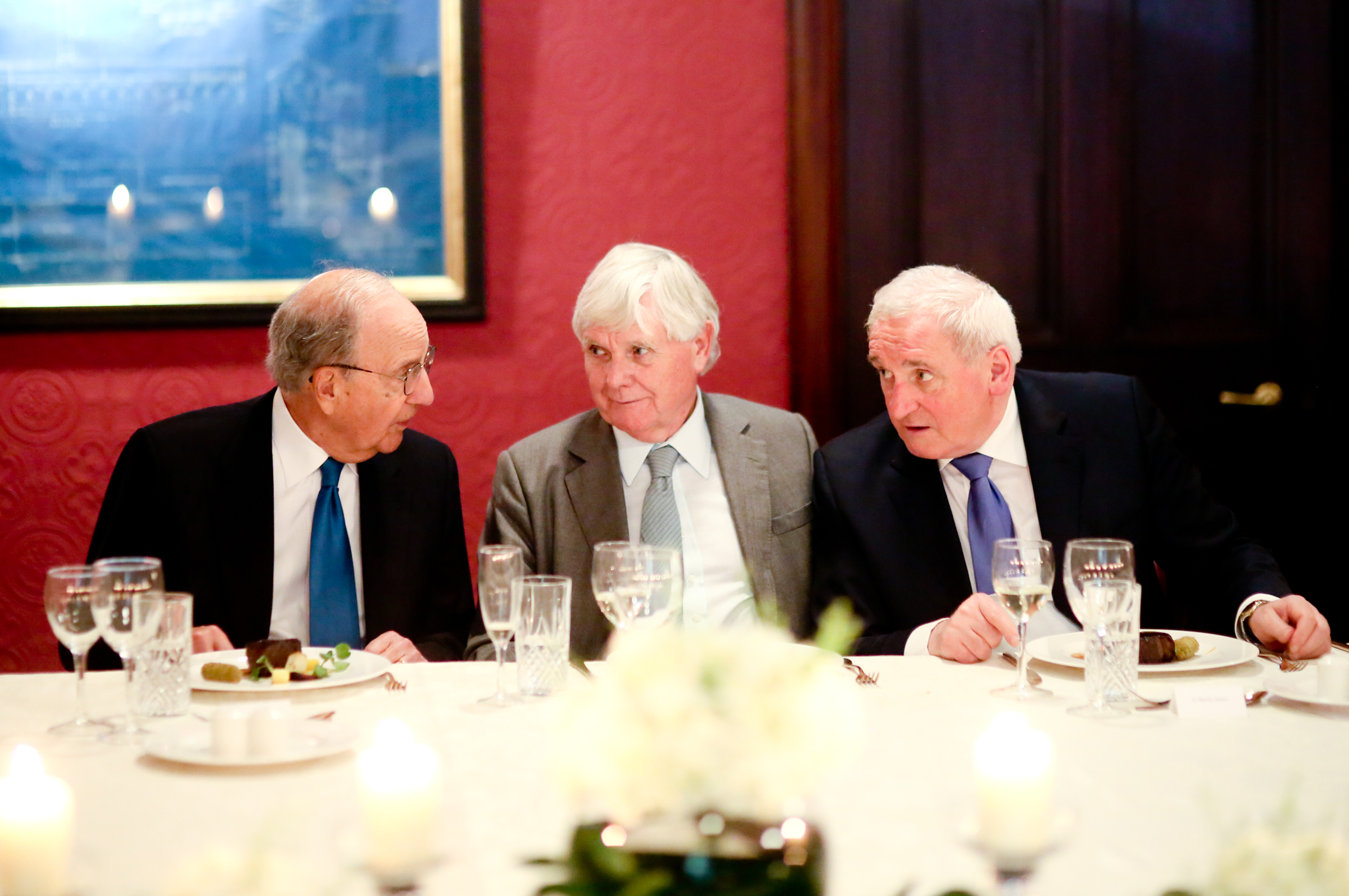
George J. Mitchell (left) and Bertie Ahern (right) in 2018

Serious political efforts to end the conflict began in the late 1980s and continued through the 1990s. Ceasefires were declared and later broken. The Agreement came after many years of complex talks, proposals, and compromises. Many people made major contributions. Tony Blair and Bertie Ahern were leaders of the UK and the Republic of Ireland at the time, respectively and Mo Mowlam was the Secretary of State for Northern Ireland. The talks were chaired by United States special envoy George J. Mitchell.

== Structure ==
The Agreement is made up of two corresponding documents, both agreed in Belfast on Good Friday, 10 April 1998:

1. a multi-party agreement by most of Northern Ireland's political parties (the Multi-Party Agreement);
2. an international agreement between the British and Irish governments (the British–Irish Agreement).

The Agreement set out a complex series of provisions relating to a number of areas, including:

- The status and system of government of Northern Ireland within the United Kingdom. (Strand 1)
- The relationship between Northern Ireland and the Republic of Ireland. (Strand 2)
- The relationship between the Republic of Ireland and the United Kingdom. (Strand 3)

== Parties ==
The Agreement was made between the British and Irish governments and eight political parties or groupings from Northern Ireland. Three were representative of unionism: the Ulster Unionist Party, which had led unionism in Ulster since the beginning of the 20th century, and two smaller parties associated with Loyalist paramilitaries, the Progressive Unionist Party (linked with the Ulster Volunteer Force (UVF)), and Ulster Democratic Party (the political wing of the Ulster Defence Association (UDA)). Two were broadly labelled nationalist: the Social Democratic and Labour Party, and Sinn Féin, the republican party associated with the Provisional Irish Republican Army. Independent of these rival traditions were two other Assembly parties, the cross-community Alliance Party and the Northern Ireland Women's Coalition. There was also the grouping Labour Coalition. US senator George J. Mitchell was sent by US president Bill Clinton to chair the talks.

The Agreement comprises two elements:

- a treaty between the two states, signed by the leaders of the two governments; and
- a more substantial agreement between the eight political parties and the two governments.

The former text has just four articles; it is that short text that is the legal agreement, but it incorporates in its schedules the latter agreement. Technically, this scheduled agreement can be distinguished as the Multi-Party Agreement, as opposed to the Belfast Agreement itself.

The vague wording of some of the provisions, described as "constructive ambiguity", helped ensure acceptance of the Agreement and served to postpone debate on some of the more contentious issues. Most notably these included paramilitary decommissioning, police reform and the normalisation of Northern Ireland.

== Status of Northern Ireland ==
The Agreement acknowledged:

- that the majority of the people of Northern Ireland wished to remain a part of the United Kingdom;
- that a substantial section of the people of Northern Ireland, and the majority of the people of the island of Ireland, wished to bring about a united Ireland.

Both of these views were acknowledged as being legitimate. For the first time, the Irish government accepted in a binding international agreement that Northern Ireland was part of the United Kingdom. The Irish Constitution was also amended to implicitly recognise Northern Ireland as part of the United Kingdom's sovereign territory, conditional upon the consent for a united Ireland from majorities of the people in both jurisdictions on the island. On the other hand, the language of the Agreement reflects a switch in the United Kingdom's statutory emphasis from one for the union to one for a united Ireland. The Agreement thus left the issue of future sovereignty over Northern Ireland open-ended.

The Agreement reached was that Northern Ireland was part of the United Kingdom, and would remain so until a majority of the people both of Northern Ireland and of the Republic of Ireland wished otherwise. Should that happen, then the British and Irish governments are under "a binding obligation" to implement that choice.

Irrespective of Northern Ireland's constitutional status within the United Kingdom, or part of a united Ireland, the right of "the people of Northern Ireland" to "identify themselves and be accepted as Irish or British, or both" (as well as their right to hold British or Irish citizenship or both) was recognised. By the words "people of Northern Ireland" the Agreement meant "all persons born in Northern Ireland and having, at the time of their birth, at least one parent who is a British citizen, an Irish citizen or is otherwise entitled to reside in Northern Ireland without any restriction on their period of residence."

The two governments also agreed, irrespective of the position of Northern Ireland:

the power of the sovereign government with jurisdiction there shall be exercised with rigorous impartiality on behalf of all the people in the diversity of their identities and traditions and shall be founded on the principles of full respect for, and equality of, civil, political, economic, social and cultural rights, of freedom from discrimination for all citizens, and of parity of esteem and of just and equal treatment for the identity, ethos and aspirations of both communities.

As part of the Agreement, the British parliament repealed the Government of Ireland Act 1920 (which had established Northern Ireland, partitioned Ireland and asserted a territorial claim over all of Ireland) and the people of the Republic of Ireland amended Articles 2 and 3 of the Constitution of Ireland, which had asserted a territorial claim over Northern Ireland.

== New institutions ==
The Agreement sets out a framework for the creation and number of institutions across three "strands".

=== Strand 1 ===
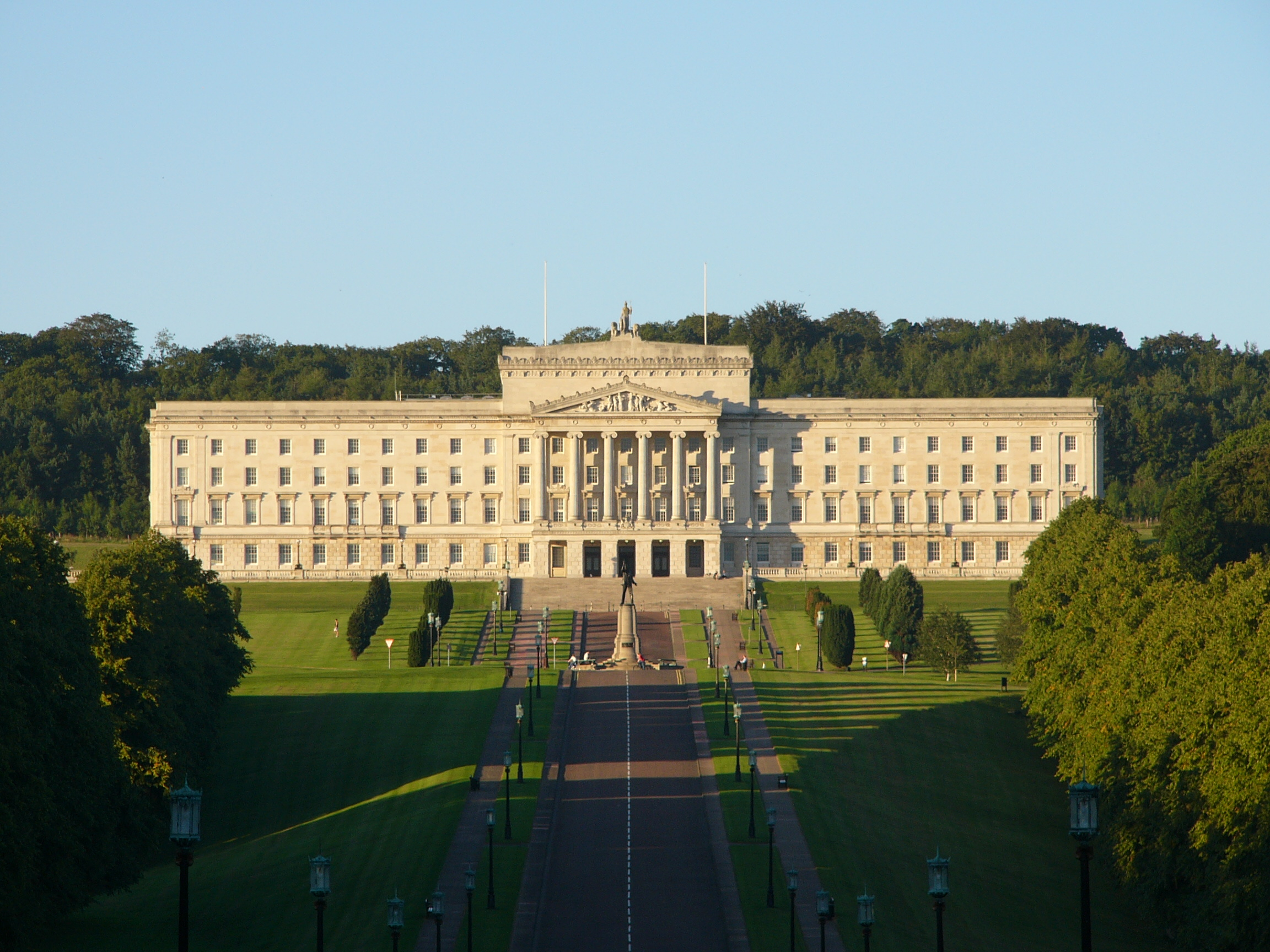
Parliament Buildings at Stormont, in Belfast, seat of the Northern Ireland Assembly

Strand 1 dealt with the democratic institutions of Northern Ireland and established two major institutions:

- Northern Ireland Assembly
- Northern Ireland Executive

The Northern Ireland Assembly is a devolved legislature for Northern Ireland with mandatory cross-community voting on certain major decisions. The Northern Ireland Executive is a power-sharing executive with ministerial portfolios to be allocated between parties by the D'Hondt method. Operation of the Assembly has been suspended several times since its creation, sometimes for years.

=== Strand 2 ===
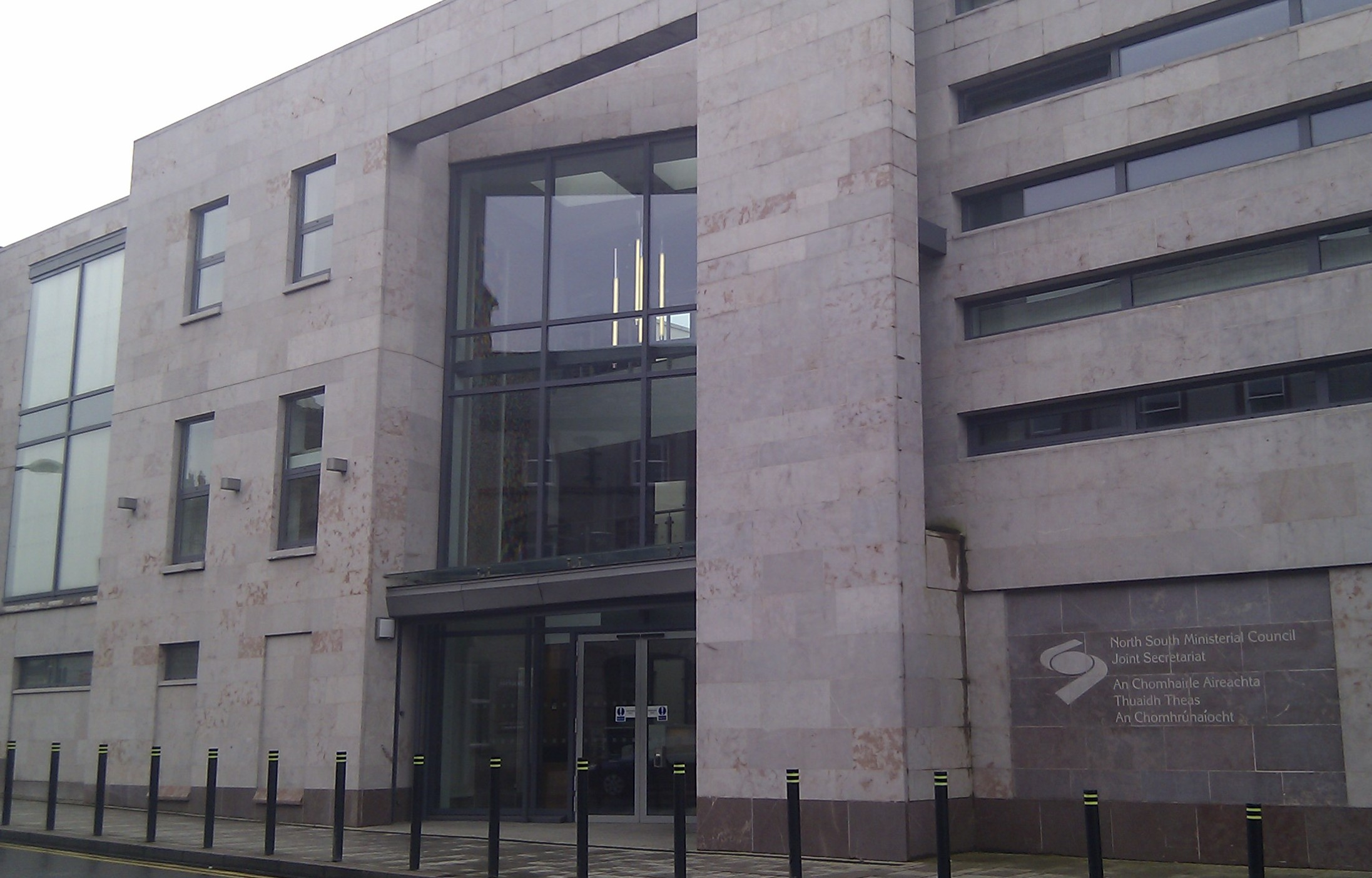
The offices of the North/South Ministerial Council on Upper English Street, Armagh, Northern Ireland

Strand 2 dealt with "north–south" issues and institutions to be created between Northern Ireland and the Republic of Ireland. These are:

- North/South Ministerial Council
- North/South Inter-Parliamentary Association
- North/South Consultative Forum

The North/South Ministerial Council is made up of ministers from the Northern Ireland Executive and the Government of Ireland. It was established "to develop consultation, co-operation and action" in twelve areas of mutual interest. These include six areas where the Northern Ireland Executive and the Government of Ireland form common policies but implement these separately in each jurisdiction, and six areas where they develop common policies that are implemented through shared all-Ireland institutions.

The various "institutional and constitutional arrangements" set out in the Agreement are also stated to be "interlocking and interdependent".

As part of the Agreement, the newly created Northern Ireland Assembly and the national parliament of Ireland (the Oireachtas) agreed to consider creating a joint parliamentary forum made up of equal numbers from both institutions. In October 2012, this forum was created as the North/South Inter-Parliamentary Association.

The Northern Ireland political parties who endorsed the Agreement were also asked to consider the establishment of an independent consultative forum representative of civil society with members with expertise in social, cultural, economic and other issues and appointed by the two administrations. An outline structure for the North/South Consultative Forum was agreed in 2002 and in 2006 the Northern Ireland Executive agreed it would support its establishment. As of 2020, the Forum had still not been created.

=== Strand 3 ===
Strand 3 dealt with "east–west" issues and institutions to be created between Ireland and Great Britain (as well as the Crown dependencies). These are:

- British–Irish Intergovernmental Conference
- British–Irish Council
- An expanded British–Irish Interparliamentary Body

The British–Irish Intergovernmental Conference was agreed to replace the Anglo-Irish Intergovernmental Council and the Intergovernmental Conference created under the 1985 Anglo-Irish Agreement.

The conference takes the form of regular and frequent meetings between the British and Irish ministers to promote co-operation at all levels between both governments. On matters not devolved to Northern Ireland, the Government of Ireland may put forward views and proposals. All decisions of the conference will be by agreement between both governments and the two governments agreed to make determined efforts to resolve disagreements between them.

The British–Irish Council is made up of ministerial representatives from the British and Irish governments, the UK's devolved administrations (Northern Ireland, Scotland, and Wales), as well as from the Crown dependencies, the Isle of Man, Jersey, and Guernsey. The purpose of the council is to promote co-operations and pose a forum for the creation of common policies.

Under the Agreement, it was proposed that the already-existing British–Irish Interparliamentary Body would be built upon. Prior to the Agreement, the body was composed of parliamentarians from the British and Irish parliaments only. In 2001, as suggested by the Agreement, it was expanded to incorporate parliamentarians from all of the members of the British–Irish Council.

These institutional arrangements created across these three strands are set out in the Agreement as being "interlocking and interdependent". In particular, the functioning of the Northern Ireland Assembly and the North/South Ministerial Council are stated to be "so closely inter-related that the success of each depends on that of the other" and participation in the North/South Ministerial Council is "one of the essential responsibilities attaching to relevant posts in [Northern Ireland and the Republic of Ireland]".

In the opinion of analyst Brendan O'Leary, the institutions established by the deal "made Northern Ireland bi-national" and reinforced "imaginative elements of co-sovereignty".

== Decommissioning and normalisation ==
Against the background of political violence during the Troubles, the Agreement committed the participants to "exclusively democratic and peaceful means of resolving differences on political issues". This took two aspects:

- decommissioning of weapons held by paramilitary groups;
- the normalisation of security arrangements in Northern Ireland.

The participants to the Agreement comprised two sovereign states (the United Kingdom and the Republic of Ireland) with armed and police forces involved in the Troubles. Two political parties, Sinn Féin and the PUP, were linked to paramilitary organisations: the IRA and the UVF respectively. The UDP, which was linked to the UDA, had withdrawn from the talks three months previously.

The multi-party agreement committed the parties to "use any influence they may have" to bring about the decommissioning of all paramilitary arms within two years of the referendums approving the Agreement. The process of normalisation committed the British government to the reduction in the number and role of its armed forces in Northern Ireland "to levels compatible with a normal peaceful society". This included the removal of security installations and the removal of special emergency powers in Northern Ireland. The Irish government committed to a "wide-ranging review" of its Offences against the State legislation.

The Agreement called for the establishment of an independent commission to review policing arrangements in Northern Ireland "including [the] means of encouraging widespread community support" for those arrangements. The British government also committed to a "wide-ranging review" of the criminal justice system in Northern Ireland.

A date of May 2000 was set for total disarming of all paramilitary groups. This was not achieved, leading the assembly to be suspended on a number of occasions as a consequence of unionist objections. A series of rounds of decommissioning by the IRA took place (in October 2001, April 2002 and October 2003) and in July 2005 the IRA announced the formal end of its campaign. Loyalist decommissioning did not follow immediately. In June 2009, the UVF announced it had completed decommissioning and the UDA said it had started to decommission its arsenal. On 6 January 2010, the UDA announced that it had put its weapons "verifiably beyond use". The decommissioning was completed five weeks before a government amnesty deadline beyond which any weapons found could have been used as evidence for a prosecution.

== Prisoner release ==
Both the British and Irish governments committed to the early release of the approximately 400 prisoners serving sentences in connection with the activities of paramilitary groups, provided that those groups continued to maintain "a complete and unequivocal ceasefire". Cases were reviewed individually by the Sentence Review Commission. Prisoners from the Continuity Irish Republican Army, the Loyalist Volunteer Force, the Irish National Liberation Army and the Real Irish Republican Army were not eligible for release as those groups had not agreed to an unequivocal ceasefire. There was no amnesty for crimes which had not been prosecuted.

The Northern Ireland (Sentences) Act 1998 (c. 35) received royal assent on 28 July 1998. 167 prisoners were released by October 1998. By December 1999, 308 prisoners had been released. The final group of prisoners was released by 28 July 2000, giving a total of 428 prisoners released.

== Equality and human rights ==
The Agreement affirmed a commitment to "the mutual respect, the civil rights and the religious liberties of everyone in the community". The multi-party agreement recognised "the importance of respect, understanding and tolerance in relation to linguistic diversity", especially in relation to the Irish language, Ulster Scots, and the languages of Northern Ireland's other ethnic minorities, "all of which are part of the cultural wealth of the island of Ireland".

The British government committed to incorporate the European Convention on Human Rights into the law of Northern Ireland and to the establishment of a Northern Ireland Human Rights Commission. Establishing statutory obligations for public authorities in Northern Ireland to carry out their work "with due regard to the need to promote equality of opportunity was set as a particular priority". The Irish government committed to "[taking] steps to further the protection of human rights in its jurisdiction" and to the establishment of an Irish Human Rights Commission.

Many of the rights-based provisions have yet to be fully implemented, including a Bill of Rights for Northern Ireland. The Northern Ireland Human Rights Commission delivered advice to the Secretary of State for Northern Ireland on 10 December 2008 as required by the Agreement. That advice was not taken forward.

The Agreement recognised divergent political aspirations and complex identities. Article 1 (vi), commonly referred to as the birthright provisions, states that both governments, "Recognise the birthright of all the people of Northern Ireland to identify themselves and be accepted as Irish, or British, or both, as they may so choose, and accordingly confirm that their right to hold both British and Irish citizenship is accepted by both Governments and would not be affected by any future change in the status of Northern Ireland".

== Referendums ==
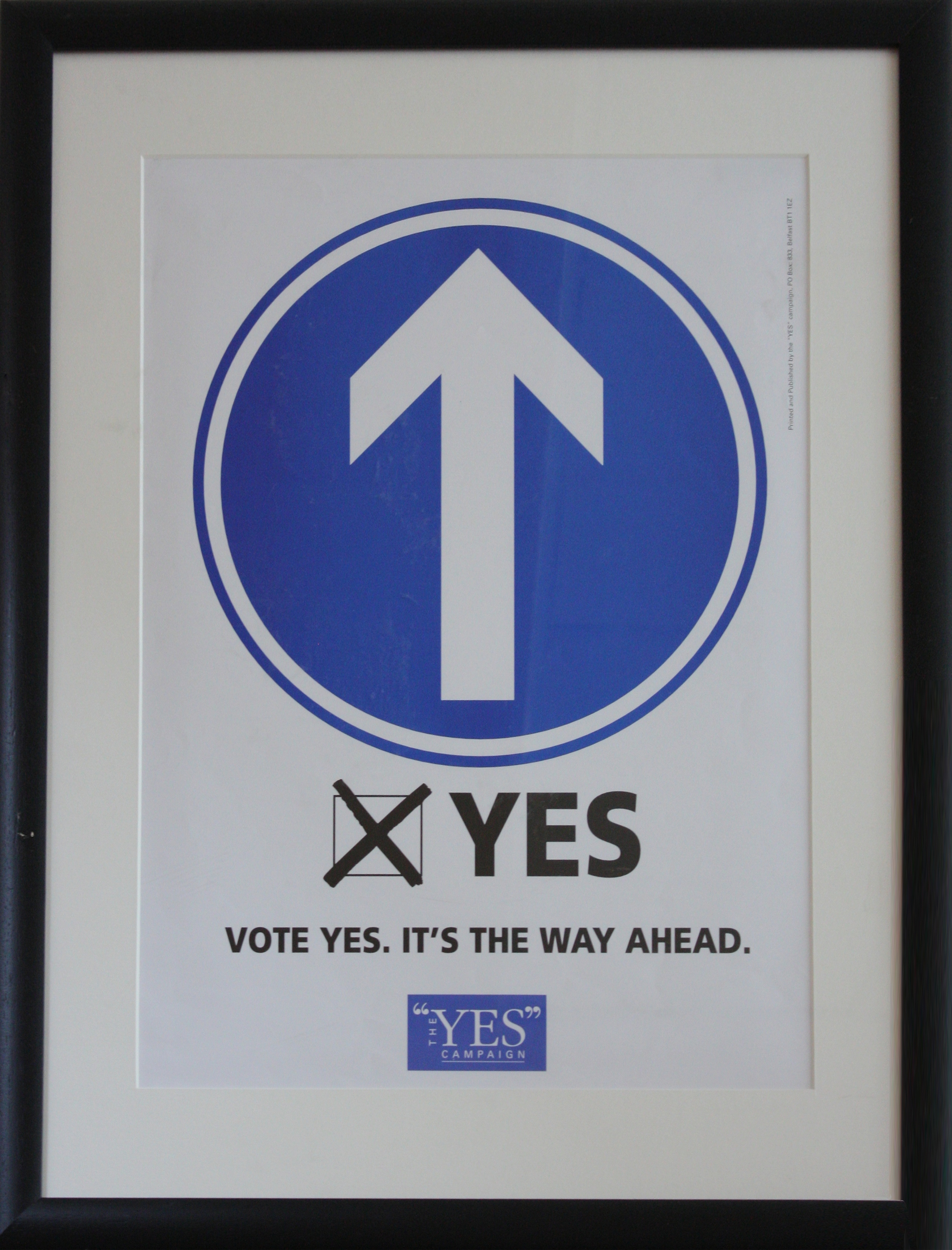
A 'Yes' campaign poster for the Good Friday Agreement during simultaneous referendums in Northern Ireland and in the Republic of Ireland

Under the Agreement, the British and Irish governments committed to organising referendums on 22 May 1998, in Northern Ireland and in the Republic respectively. The Northern Ireland referendum was to approve the agreement reached in the multi-party talks. The Republic of Ireland referendum was to approve the British-Irish Agreement and to facilitate the amendment of the Constitution of Ireland in accordance with the Agreement.

The result of these referendums was a large majority in both parts of Ireland in favour of the Agreement. In the Republic, 56% of the electorate voted, with 94% of the votes in favour of the amendment to the constitution. The turnout in Northern Ireland was 81%, with 71% of the votes in favour of the Agreement. Of those who voted, almost all Catholics voted for the Agreement, compared with 57% of Protestants. The fragility of cross-community enthusiasm for parts of the Agreement helps to explain subsequent difficulties in maintaining the power-sharing executive.

In the Republic, the electorate voted upon the nineteenth amendment to the Constitution of Ireland. This amendment both permitted the state to comply with the Belfast Agreement and provided for the removal of the "territorial claim" contained in Articles 2 and 3. A referendum on the Amsterdam Treaty (Eighteenth Amendment of the Constitution of Ireland) was held on the same day.

Northern Ireland Good Friday Agreement referendum, 1998
| Choice | Votes | % |
|---|---|---|
| For | 676,966 | 71.11 |
| Against | 274,979 | 28.89 |
| Total | 951,945 | 100.00 |
| Valid votes | 951,945 | 99.82 |
| Invalid/blank votes | 1,738 | 0.18 |
| Total votes | 953,683 | 100.00 |
| Registered voters/turnout | | 81.1 |

Nineteenth Amendment of the Constitution of Ireland referendum
| Choice | Votes | % |
|---|---|---|
| For | 1,442,583 | 94.39 |
| Against | 85,748 | 5.61 |
| Total | 1,528,331 | 100.00 |
| Valid votes | 1,528,331 | 98.90 |
| Invalid/blank votes | 17,064 | 1.10 |
| Total votes | 1,545,395 | 100.00 |
| Registered voters/turnout | | 56.26 |

== Implementation ==
Direct rule from Westminster came to an end in Northern Ireland when power was formally devolved to the new Northern Ireland Assembly, the North/South Ministerial Council and the British–Irish Council, as the commencement orders for the British-Irish Agreement came into effect on 2 December 1999. Article 4(2) of the British-Irish Agreement (the agreement between the British and Irish governments for the implementation of the Belfast Agreement) required the two governments to notify each other in writing of the completion of the requirements for the entry into force of the British-Irish Agreement; entry into force was to be upon the receipt of the later of the two notifications. The British government agreed to participate in a televised ceremony at Iveagh House in Dublin, the Irish department of foreign affairs. Peter Mandelson, the Secretary of State for Northern Ireland, attended early on 2 December 1999. He exchanged notifications with David Andrews, the Irish foreign minister. Shortly after the ceremony, at 10:30 am, the Taoiseach, Bertie Ahern, signed the declaration formally amending Articles 2 and 3 of the Irish Constitution. He then announced to the Dáil that the British-Irish Agreement had entered into force (including certain supplementary agreements concerning the Belfast Agreement).

Speaking at the 1998 commemoration of the Easter Rising of 1916, Ahern said:

The British Government are effectively out of the equation and neither the British parliament nor people have any legal right under this agreement to impede the achievement of Irish unity if it had the consent of the people North and South... Our nation is and always will be a 32-county nation. Antrim and Down are, and will remain, as much a part of Ireland as any southern county.

The Assembly and Executive were eventually established in December 1999 on the understanding that decommissioning would begin immediately, but were suspended within two months due to lack of progress, before being re-established in May 2000 as Provisional IRA decommissioning eventually began. Aside from the decommissioning issue, ongoing smaller-scale paramilitary activity by the Provisional Irish Republican Army—e.g., arms importations, smuggling, organised crime, punishment beatings, intelligence-gathering and rioting—was also a stumbling block. The loyalist paramilitaries also continued similar activity although as they were not represented by a significant political party, their position was less central to political change.

The overall result of these problems was that confidence in the Agreement among unionists was damaged. The DUP, the sole anti-Agreement party, overtook the pro-Agreement UUP in the 2003 Assembly election. The UUP had already resigned from the power-sharing Executive in 2002 following the Stormontgate scandal, which saw three Sinn Féin members charged with intelligence-gathering. These charges were eventually dropped in 2005 on the controversial grounds that pursuit would not be "in the public interest". One of the three, Denis Donaldson, was afterwards exposed as a British agent.

In 2004, negotiations were held between the two governments, the DUP, and Sinn Féin on an agreement to re-establish the institutions. These talks failed, but a document published by the governments detailing changes to the Belfast Agreement became known as the "Comprehensive Agreement". On 26 September 2005, it was announced that the Provisional Irish Republican Army had completely decommissioned its arsenal of weapons and "put them beyond use". Nonetheless, many unionists notably the DUP, remained sceptical. Of the loyalist paramilitaries, only the Loyalist Volunteer Force had decommissioned any weapons. Further negotiations took place in October 2006, leading to the St Andrews Agreement.

In May 2007, a power-sharing executive was again established to govern Northern Ireland in devolved matters. The second Northern Ireland Executive had Ian Paisley of the DUP as First Minister and Martin McGuinness of Sinn Féin as deputy First Minister in a diarchy.

Paisley retired from the office of First Minister and from the leadership of the DUP on 5 June 2008 and was succeeded in both functions by Peter Robinson. In the third Northern Ireland Executive, the same political relationship existed between Robinson and McGuinness as existed formerly between Paisley and McGuinness. After Robinson resigned as First Minister on 11 January 2016, he was replaced by Arlene Foster. Upon McGuinness's resignation on 9 January 2017, the devolved government in Stormont collapsed, as the Agreement demands when no new leader is appointed. An election was called by Secretary of State for Northern Ireland James Brokenshire, whereby the DUP and Sinn Féin were returned as the largest parties, and so began a countdown of talks between both leaders before devolved government could be restored. In January 2020, the Executive was re-established.

== Comparison to the Sunningdale Agreement ==
The Agreement has been referred to as "Sunningdale for slow learners", (Note: The phrase "Sunningdale for slow learners" was coined by Seamus Mallon, but not to describe the Good Friday Agreement. He used it in 1996, at a time when the peace process was dangerously close to collapse, to describe the most likely outcome of any talks process.) which suggests that it was nothing more than what was on offer in the Sunningdale Agreement of 1973. This assertion has been criticised by political scientists like Richard Wilford and Stefan Wolff. The former stated that "there are ... significant differences between them [Sunningdale and Belfast], both in terms of content and the circumstances surrounding their negotiation, implementation, and operation".

The main issues omitted by Sunningdale and addressed by the Belfast Agreement are the principle of self-determination, the recognition of both national identities, British-Irish intergovernmental cooperation and the legal procedures to make power-sharing mandatory, such as the cross-community vote and the D'Hondt system to appoint ministers to the executive. Former IRA member and journalist Tommy McKearney says that the main difference is the intention of the British government to broker a comprehensive deal by including the IRA and the most uncompromising unionists. Regarding the right to self-determination, two qualifications are noted by the legal writer Austen Morgan. Firstly, the cession of territory from one state to another state has to be by international agreement between the UK and Irish governments. Secondly, the people of Northern Ireland can no longer bring about a united Ireland on their own; they need not only the Irish government but the people of their neighbouring state, Ireland, to also endorse unity. Morgan also pointed out that, unlike the Ireland Act 1949 and the Northern Ireland Constitution Act 1973, devised under Sunningdale, the 1998 Agreement and the consequent British legislation did expressly foresee the possibility of a united Ireland.

As well as the number of signatories, (Note: Wolff identifies the United Kingdom, the Republic of Ireland, the Ulster Unionist Party, the SDLP, and the Alliance Party as signatories to the Sunningdale Agreement. He identifies the United Kingdom, the Republic of Ireland, the Ulster Unionist Party, the Ulster Democratic Party, the Progressive Unionist Party, the Northern Ireland Women's Coalition, the Labour Party, the Alliance Party, Sinn Féin, and the SDLP as signatories to the Belfast Agreement.) Stefan Wolff identifies the following similarities and differences between the issues addressed in the two agreements:

| | Sunningdale Agreement | Belfast Agreement |
|---|---|---|
| Consent principle | Checked | Checked |
| Self-determination | | Checked |
| Reform of the policing system | Checked | Checked |
| Prisoners | Checked | Checked |
| Bill of Rights | Checked | Checked |
| Abandonment of violence | Checked | Checked |
| Security co-operation | Checked | Checked |
| Cross-border co-operation | Checked | Checked |
| Recognition of both identities | | Checked |
| Inter-governmental co-operation | Checked | Checked |
| Institutional role for the RoI | Checked | Checked |
| Power-sharing† | Checked | Checked |
| Inter-island co-operation | | Checked |
| Devolution of powers | Checked | Checked |

† Wolff identifies this issue as being implicitly addressed in the Sunningdale Agreement.

== Constitutional relevance ==
Because the Good Friday Agreement binds the British government on several points of law in Northern Ireland, it has de facto become part of the constitution of the United Kingdom. Legal commentator David Allen Green described it as "a core constitutional text of the UK, and of Ireland ... of more everyday importance than hallowed instruments such as, say, Magna Carta of 1215 or the 1689 Bill of Rights".

Because the Agreement commits the government to enshrine the European Convention on Human Rights in law and allows Northern Ireland residents access to the European Court of Human Rights, it required enactment of the Human Rights Act 1998. Consequently, the Agreement was a significant factor preventing the repeal of that Act and its replacement with the proposed British Bill of Rights that Prime Minister David Cameron had promised.

The Agreement also makes reference to the UK and the Republic of Ireland as "partners in the European Union", and it was argued in R (Miller) v Secretary of State for Exiting the European Union that the Agreement meant that the consent of Northern Ireland's voters was required to leave the European Union (Brexit). The UK Supreme Court unanimously held that this was not the case, but the Agreement has nevertheless strongly shaped the form of Brexit.

== Brexit ==
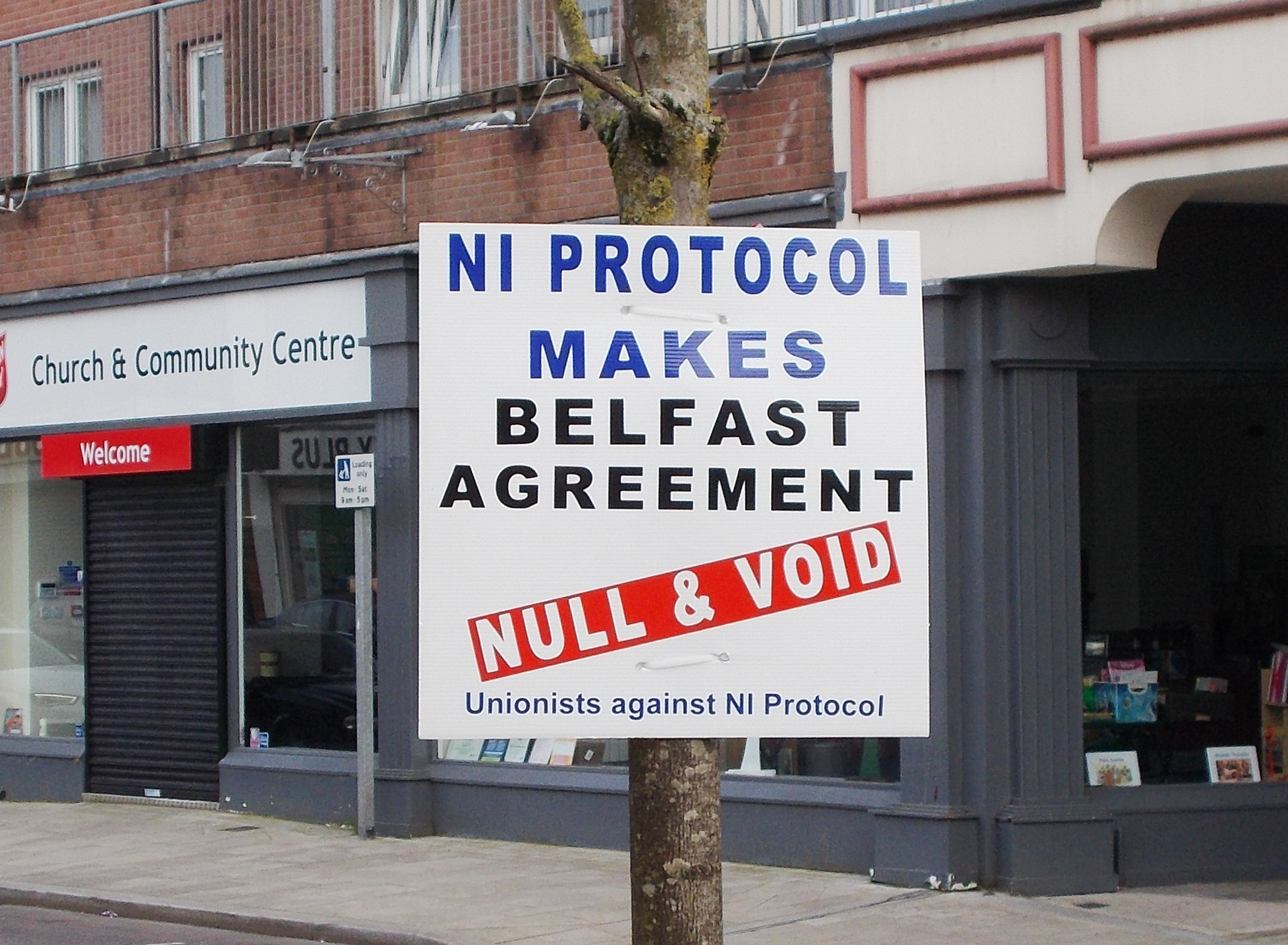
Anti-Northern Ireland Protocol poster. Main Street, Larne March 2021

During the negotiations on Britain's planned 2019 withdrawal from the European Union, the EU produced a position paper on its concerns regarding the Good Friday Agreement. The paper identified a range of issues including the avoidance of a hard border, North–South cooperation, citizenship, and the Common Travel Area. Anyone born in Northern Ireland, who is also entitled to Irish citizenship, will also be able to retain EU citizenship after Brexit. Under the European Union negotiating directives for Brexit, the UK was asked to satisfy the other EU members that these topics had been addressed in order to progress to the second stage of Brexit negotiations.

In order to protect North–South co-operation and avoid controls on the Irish border, the UK, led by Prime Minister Theresa May, agreed to protect the Agreement in all its parts and "in the absence of agreed solutions, the United Kingdom would maintain full alignment with those rules of the Internal Market and the Customs Union which, now or in the future, support North-South cooperation, the all-island economy and the protection of the 1998 Agreement", with the acknowledgement that this is "under the caveat that nothing is agreed until everything is agreed". This provision formed part of a UK-EU deal which was rejected by the British parliament on three occasions. May's successor, Boris Johnson, called for the "Irish backstop" to be removed from the proposed withdrawal agreement. The new Northern Ireland Protocol replaced the Irish backstop as part of the deal which Johnson brokered on 17 October 2019.

In September 2020, while negotiations with the EU over future trading arrangements continued, the Internal Market Bill was introduced in which the Northern Ireland secretary Brandon Lewis told the House of Commons that the British government planned to break international law in a "specific and limited way", by introducing new powers through notwithstanding clauses that would circumvent certain treaty obligations to the EU as set out in the withdrawal agreement. The Bill was criticised in the UK and internationally, with the First Ministers of Scotland and Wales both describing the Conservative government's proposals as an attempt to seize power and undo devolution. Most parties in Northern Ireland expressed concern at the Bill, though some within the Democratic Unionist Party welcomed it. Taoiseach Micheál Martin said that "trust has been eroded". The bill was enacted in December 2020 without the controversial Northern Ireland provisions.

The DUP and other Brexit supporters have criticised the British government for erecting a trade border "down the Irish Sea"—in other words, between the island of Ireland and Britain. They state that in order to prevent a "hard border" on the island of Ireland, customs and other controls have instead been imposed on goods travelling from Britain to Northern Ireland; and that Northern Ireland remains for many purposes in the EU Single Market and Customs Union, subject to a regulatory regime into which it has no input.

In March 2021, the Loyalist Communities Council, representing loyalist paramilitary groups, said they were temporarily withdrawing their support for the Agreement, but emphasised that unionist opposition to the protocol should remain "peaceful and democratic".

== See also ==
- David Trimble
- Downing Street Declaration
- John Hume
- Martin McGuinness
- Unionism in Ireland
