= British–Irish Council =

Intergovernmental organisation

- Logo of the British–Irish Council

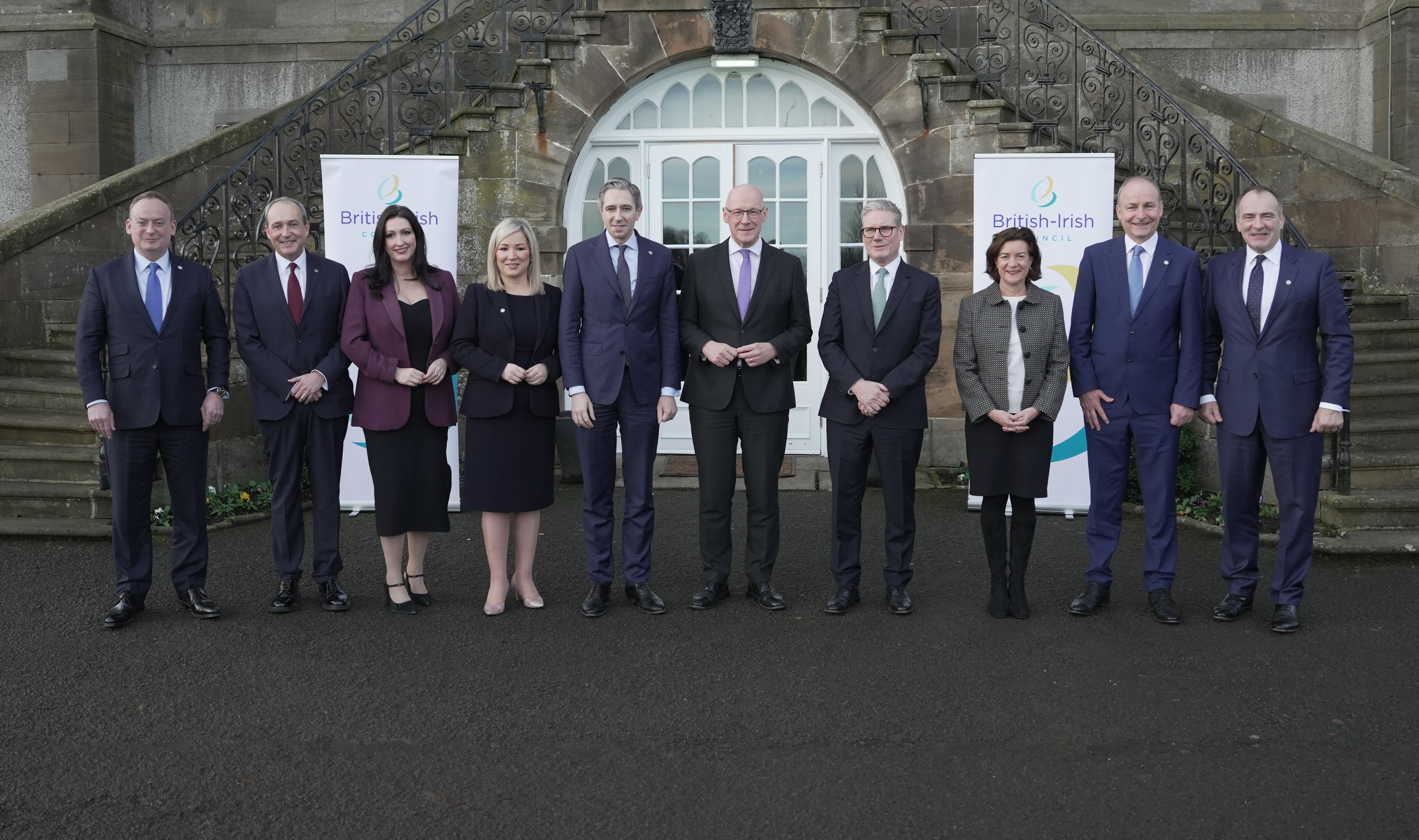
- Heads of government meet in Edinburgh, Scotland, for the 42nd council summit
- Abbreviation: BIC
- Formation: 2 December 1999; 26 years ago
- Founders: Ireland; United Kingdom
- Type: Intergovernmental organisation
- Purpose: "Promoting positive, practical, relations... between the people of these islands."
- Headquarters: Edinburgh, Scotland (secretariat)
- Coordinates: 55.9458°N 3.2226°W
- Region served: British Isles
- Members: Ireland; United Kingdom; Scotland; Wales; Northern Ireland; Guernsey; Isle of Man; Jersey; Cornwall (advisor)
- Website: www.britishirishcouncil.org

The British–Irish Council (BIC; Irish: Comhairle na Breataine–na hÉireann; Welsh: Cyngor Prydeinig-Gwyddelig) is an intergovernmental organisation that aims to improve collaboration between its members in a number of areas including transport, the environment and energy. Its membership comprises the governments of Ireland, the United Kingdom, Northern Ireland, Scotland, Wales, Guernsey, Jersey and the Isle of Man.

The British and Irish governments, and political parties in Northern Ireland, agreed to form a council under the British–Irish Agreement, part of the Good Friday Agreement reached in 1998. The council was formally established on 2 December 1999, when the Agreement came into effect. The council's stated aim is to "promote the harmonious and mutually beneficial development of the totality of relationships among the peoples of these islands". The BIC has a standing secretariat, located in Edinburgh, Scotland; it meets in semi-annual summits and more frequent ministerial meetings.

== Background ==
The British–Irish Council was established on 10 April 1998 following two years worth of negotiations between the UK and Irish Governments alongside the political parties in Northern Ireland on the terms of the Good Friday Agreement. Under the terms of the agreement, a political organisation was to be established in order to foster and provide opportunities to greater integral working between both the UK and Irish governments, and later the devolved governments of Scotland, Wales and Northern Ireland. The Multi-Party agreement between both the UK and Irish governments formally came into effect on 2 December 1999.

Since its formation, the heads of governments of the United Kingdom, the Republic of Ireland, Scotland, Northern Ireland, Wales, the Isle of Man, Guernsey and Jersey have met biannually during the Heads of Administrations summit. The first meeting of the British–Irish council took place on 17 December 1999. The first meeting was hosted by the United Kingdom and Prime Minister Tony Blair in London.

In 2006, the St. Andrews Agreement was signed in order to establish a standing permanent Secretariat to the British–Irish Council. The establishment of the position was designed to "further the British-Irish Council work". The Permanent Secretariat was established six years later in Edinburgh, following an agreement between council members at the summit in 2010 hosted by Guernsey that the Scottish Government would be the Permanent Secretariat host. The Secretariat was formally established in January 2012.

In 2023, the summits held in Jersey and the Republic of Ireland marked twenty-five years since the Good Friday Agreement, whilst the 42nd summit hosted by Scotland in December 2024 marked twenty-five years since the inaugural meeting of the council.

== Overview and structure ==
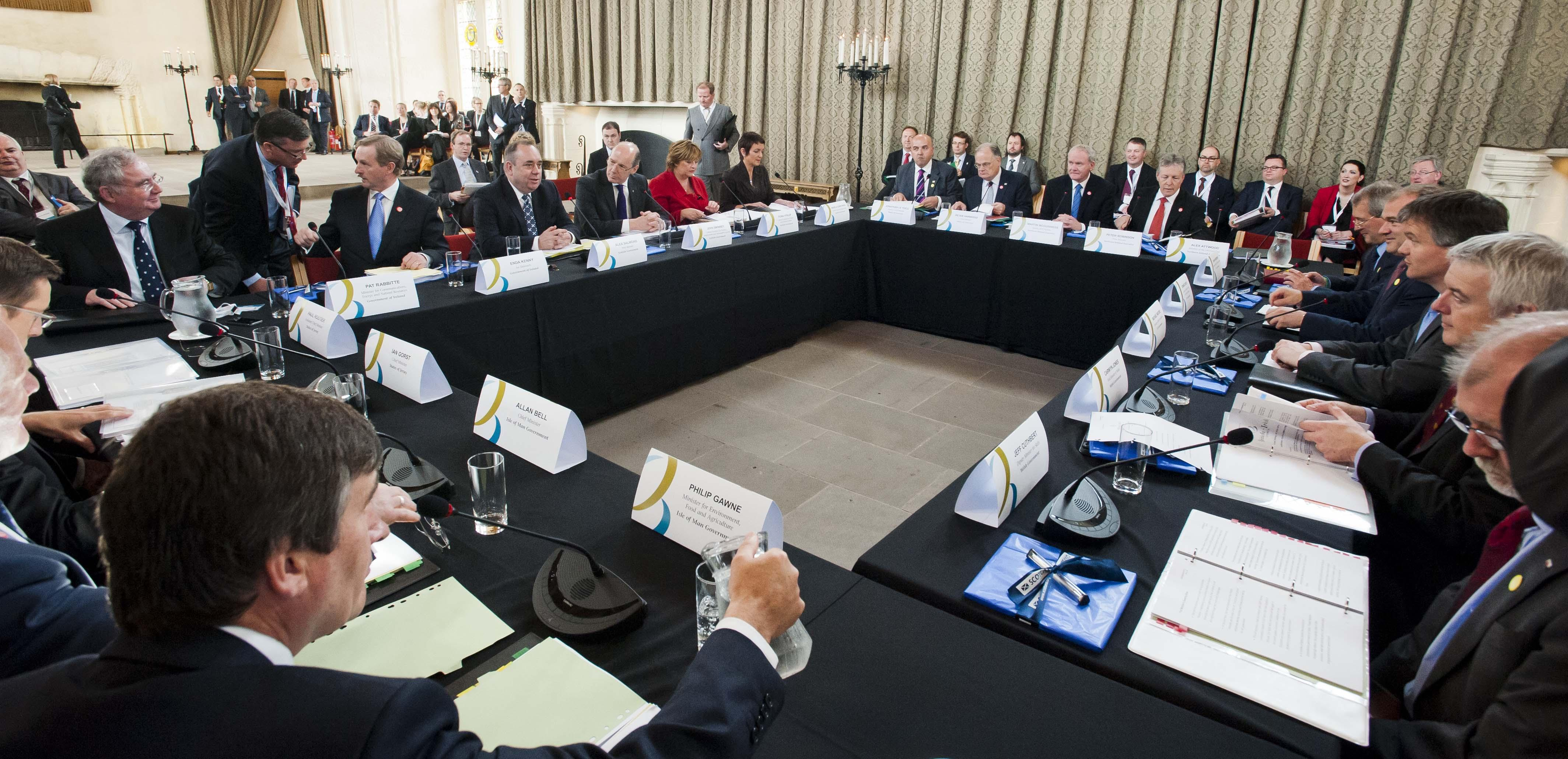
A British-Irish Council summit hosted by Scotland at Stirling Castle

The nine heads of government meet at summits twice per year. Additionally, there are regular meetings that deal with specific sectors which are attended by the corresponding ministers. Representatives of members operate in accordance with whatever procedures for democratic authority and accountability are in force in their respective elected legislatures.

England, unlike the other countries of the United Kingdom, is not represented separately, as it does not have its own devolved administration. It is thus solely represented on the council as part of the United Kingdom. Although Cornwall technically holds observer status on the Council due to its language, it is also represented by the UK government.

The work of the council is financed by members through mutual agreement as required. At the ninth meeting of the Council in July 2007 it was decided that with devolved government returned to Northern Ireland that an opportune time existed "to undertake a strategic review of the Council's work programmes, working methods and support arrangements." This decision included the potential for a permanent standing secretariat, which was established in Edinburgh, Scotland, on 4 January 2012.

At its June 2010 summit, the Council decided to move forward on recommendations to enhance the relationship between it and the British-Irish Parliamentary Assembly (BIPA). The British-Irish Parliamentary Assembly is made up of members from the parliaments and assemblies of the same states and regions as the members of the British–Irish Council. The Council tasked its secretariat with moving this work forward in conjunction with the BIPA's secretariat.

== Work areas ==
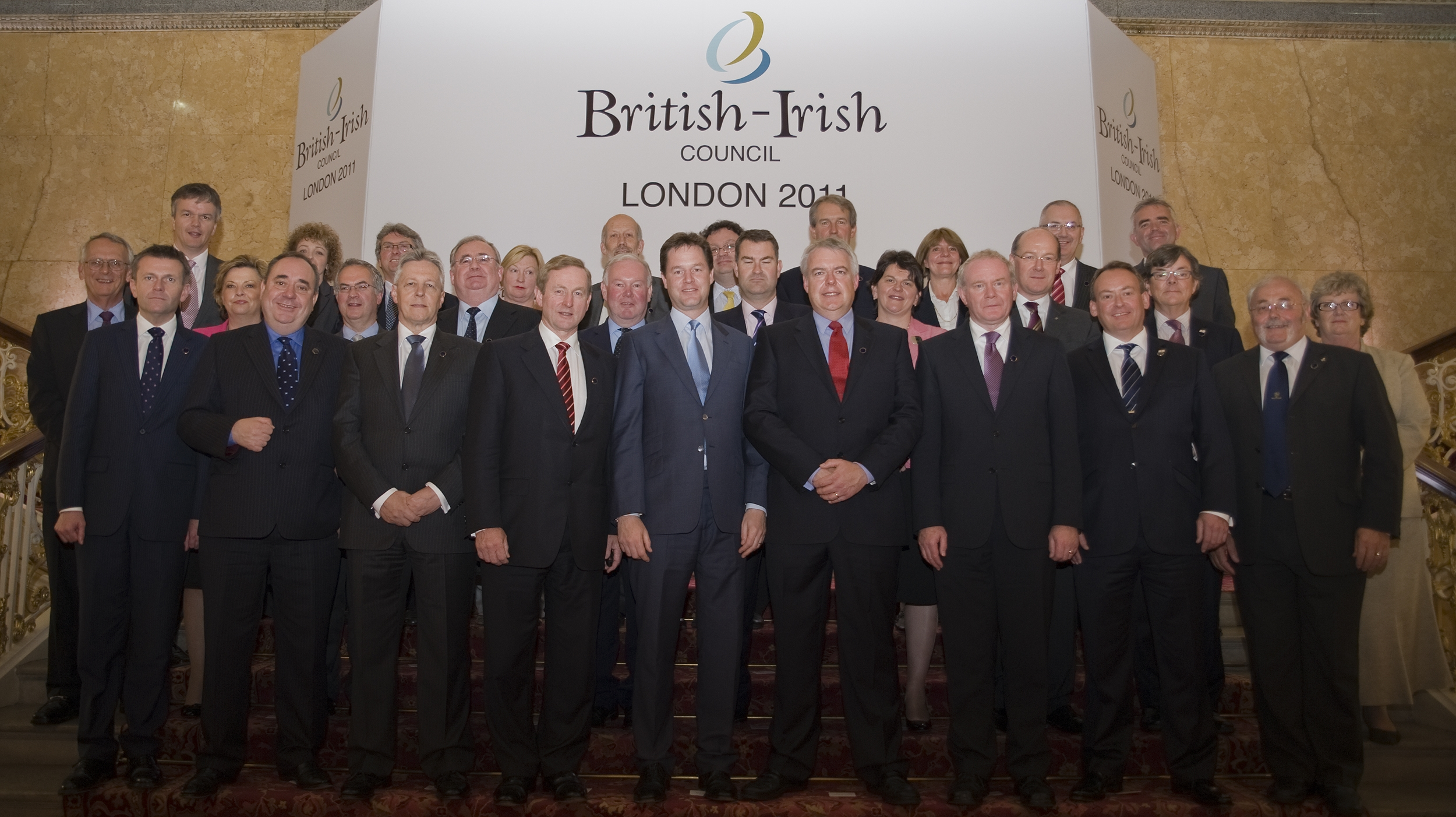
Heads of government gather at the 16th summit held in London, June 2011

The Council agrees to specific work areas for which individual members take responsibility. The Belfast Agreement suggested transport links, agriculture, environmental issues, culture, health, education and approaches to the European Union as suitable topics for early discussion. However, these work areas can be expanded or reduced as the Council decides. It is also open to the council to make agreement on common policies. These agreements are made through consensus, although individual members may opt not to participate in implementing any of these.

The current list of work areas and the member responsible are:

- Collaborative spatial planning (Northern Ireland)
- Demography (Scotland)
- Digital inclusion (Isle of Man)
- Early years policy (Wales)
- Energy (United Kingdom – Electricity Grids, and Scotland – Marine)
- Environment (United Kingdom)
- Housing (Northern Ireland)
- Indigenous, minority and lesser-used languages (Wales)
- Misuse of Substances (drugs and alcohol) (Ireland)
- Social inclusion (Scotland and Wales)
- Transport (Northern Ireland)
- Creative Industries (Jersey)

Demography was adopted as a work area at the 2006 meeting of the council. It was proposed by the Scottish Executive, who also took responsibility for it. During the 2007 meeting of the council the Scottish Government further proposed that energy become a work area of the council. Past work sector areas included knowledge economy, e-health / telemedicine and tourism.

== Membership ==
=== Member administrations ===
Member	Type	Membership status	Represented since
UK Government	Sovereign state	Full	1999
Government of Ireland	Sovereign state	Full	1999
Scottish Government	Devolved government	Full	1999
Welsh Government	Devolved government	Full	1999
Northern Ireland Executive	Devolved government	Full	1999
Government of Jersey	Crown dependency	Full	1999
Isle of Man Government	Crown dependency	Full	1999
Government of Guernsey	Crown dependency	Full	1999

=== Advisors ===
Advisor	Type	Status	Represented since
Cornwall Council	Unitary authority	Advisor on the Cornish language	2023

=== Current leaders ===
Membership of the Council consists of the following administrations (with current heads of administrations as of July 2026):

Member	Representative(s)	Party	Title
United Kingdom	Andy Burnham MP	Labour Co-op	Prime Minister
Ireland	Micheál Martin TD	Fianna Fáil	Taoiseach
Ireland	Simon Harris TD	Fine Gael	Tánaiste
Scotland	John Swinney MSP	Scottish National Party	First Minister
Wales	Rhun ap Iorwerth MS	Plaid Cymru	First Minister
Northern Ireland (Note: The First Minister and Deputy First Minister of Northern Ireland is a diarchy. While other members of the organisation are represented at Summit Meetings by their respective chief ministers, or on occasions have sent their deputies, Northern Ireland is represented by both the First Minister and deputy First Minister of Northern Ireland. The Scottish and Welsh Deputy First Ministers have attended meetings in the past.)	Michelle O'Neill MLA	Sinn Féin	First Minister
Northern Ireland	Emma Little-Pengelly MLA	Democratic Unionist Party	Deputy First Minister
Jersey	Deputy Lyndon Farnham	Independent	Chief Minister
Isle of Man	Alfred Cannan MHK	Independent	Chief Minister
Guernsey	Deputy Lindsay de Sausmarez	Independent	Chief Minister

== Name of the Council ==
Initial suggestions for the council included the names Council of the British Isles or Council of the Isles, and the council has sometimes been known by the latter name. However, owing to sensitivities around the term British Isles, particularly in Ireland, the name British–Irish Council was agreed.

The official name of the council is represented in minority and lesser-used languages of the council as:

- Cornish: Konsel Predennek-Iwerdhonek
- Guernésiais: Conseil Britannique-Irlàndais
- Irish: Comhairle na Breataine-na hÉireann
- Jèrriais: Conseil Britannique-Irlandais
- Manx: Coonceil Ghoaldagh-Yernagh
- Scottish Gaelic: Comhairle Bhreatainn-Èirinn
- Scots: Brits-Airis Cooncil
- Ulster-Scots: Britisch-Airisch Cooncil
- Welsh: Cyngor Prydeinig-Gwyddelig

== Summits ==
Number	Date	Host	Host leader(s)	Location held	Communique/reference
1st	17 December 1999	United Kingdom	Tony Blair	London	
2nd	30 November 2001	Ireland	Bertie Ahern	Dublin	
3rd	14 June 2002	Jersey	Pierre Horsfall	Saint Helier	
4th	22 November 2002	Scotland	Jack McConnell	New Lanark	
5th	28 November 2003	Wales	Rhodri Morgan	St Fagans National History Museum, Cardiff	
6th	28 November 2004	Guernsey	Laurie Morgan	Castle Cornet	
7th	20 May 2005	Isle of Man	Donald Gelling	Villa Marina, Douglas	
8th	2 June 2006	United Kingdom	John Prescott	ExCeL Conference Centre, London	
9th	16 July 2007	Northern Ireland	Ian Paisley; Martin McGuinness	Parliament Buildings, Belfast	
10th	14 February 2008	Ireland	Bertie Ahern	Royal Hospital Kilmainham, Dublin	
11th	26 September 2008	Scotland	Alex Salmond	Hopetoun House, South Queensferry	
12th	20 February 2009	Wales	Rhodri Morgan	SWALEC Stadium, Cardiff	
13th	13 November 2009	Jersey	Terry Le Sueur	Radisson Hotel, Saint Helier	
14th	25 June 2010	Guernsey	Lyndon Trott	Fermain Valley Hotel, Saint Peter Port	
15th	13 December 2010	Isle of Man	Tony Brown	Sefton Hotel, Douglas	
16th	20 June 2011	United Kingdom	Nick Clegg	Lancaster House, London	
17th	13 January 2012	Ireland	Enda Kenny	Dublin Castle, Dublin	
18th	22 June 2012	Scotland	Alex Salmond	Stirling Castle, Stirling	
19th	26 November 2012	Wales	Carwyn Jones	Cardiff Castle, Cardiff	
20th	21 June 2013	Northern Ireland	Peter Robinson; Martin McGuinness	Magee College, Derry	
21st	15 November 2013	Jersey	Ian Gorst	L’Horizon Hotel, Saint Brélade	
22nd	13 June 2014	Guernsey	Jonathan Le Tocq	St. Pierre Park Hotel, Saint Peter Port	
23rd	28 November 2014	Isle of Man	Allan Bell	Villa Marina Complex, Douglas	
24th	19 June 2015	Ireland	Enda Kenny	Dublin Castle, Dublin	
25th	27 November 2015	United Kingdom	Theresa Villiers	Lancaster House, London	
26th	17 June 2016	Scotland	Nicola Sturgeon	Crowne Plaza Hotel, Glasgow	
27th Extraordinary	22 July 2016	Wales	Carwyn Jones	Cathays Park, Cardiff	
28th	25 November 2016	Wales	Carwyn Jones	Cathays Park, Cardiff	
29th	10 November 2017	Jersey	Ian Gorst	L’Horizon Hotel, St. Brelade	
30th	22 June 2018	Guernsey	Gavin St Pier	St Pierre Park Hotel, Saint Peter Port	[30]
31st	9 November 2018	Isle of Man	Howard Quayle	Isle of Man	[31]
32nd	28 June 2019	United Kingdom	David Lidington	Manchester	[32]
33rd	15 November 2019	Ireland	Leo Varadkar	Dublin	[33]
34th	6 November 2020	Scotland	Nicola Sturgeon	via video conferencing	
35th	11 June 2021	Northern Ireland	Arlene Foster and Michelle O’Neill	Lough Erne resort, Fermanagh	
36th	19 November 2021	Wales	Mark Drakeford	Cardiff	
37th	8 July 2022	Guernsey	Peter Ferbrache	St. Pierre Park Hotel, Saint Peter Port	
38th	11 November 2022	United Kingdom	Rishi Sunak	Blackpool	
39th	16 June 2023	Jersey	Kristina Moore	St Brelade	
40th	24 November 2023	Ireland	Leo Varadkar	Dublin Castle	
41st	21 June 2024	Isle of Man	Alfred Cannan	Isle of Man	
42nd	5–6 December 2024	Scotland	John Swinney	Edinburgh	
43rd	9 June 2025	Northern Ireland	Michelle O'Neill and Emma Little-Pengelly	Belfast	
44th	1 December 2025	Wales	Eluned Morgan	Cardiff	
45th	10 July 2026	Guernsey	Lindsay de Sausmarez	Saint Peter Port	

== See also ==
- Council of Ireland
- North/South Ministerial Council
- British–Irish Intergovernmental Conference
- British–Irish Parliamentary Assembly
- Interparliamentary Forum
- Council of Nations and Regions
- East–West Council
