= List of Northern Ireland ministers, government departments and executive agencies =

A list of Northern Ireland ministers, government departments, executive agencies and related organisations.

The devolved government of Northern Ireland (the Northern Ireland Executive) is responsible for most public services in the region but some services are also provided by the United Kingdom Government and cross-border bodies under the North/South Ministerial Council. Public bodies take several forms with some reporting directly to their department (executive agencies) and others operating having more independence as they advise government (non-departmental public bodies).

Below the regional tier of public bodies, public services are also provided by 11 local authorities, one educational authority and five health and social care trusts. Others are accountable directly to the Northern Ireland Assembly or to external organisations, like the European Union.

== Ministers ==
Northern Ireland Executive

- First Minister
- deputy First Minister
  - junior Ministers (accountable to the First Minister and deputy First Minister)
- Minister for Agriculture, Environment and Rural Affairs
- Minister for Communities
- Minister for Economy
- Minister for Education
- Minister for Finance
- Minister for Health
- Minister for Infrastructure
- Minister for Justice

United Kingdom Government

- Secretary of State for Northern Ireland
  - Minister of State for Northern Ireland
  - Parliamentary Under-Secretary of State for Northern Ireland

== Law officers ==
- Attorney General for Northern Ireland (advisor to the Northern Ireland Executive)
- Advocate General for Northern Ireland (advisor to the United Kingdom Government, also Attorney General for England and Wales)

== Northern Ireland Executive ==
=== Ministerial Departments ===
- The Executive Office (TEO)
  - Non-Departmental Public Bodies:
    - Commission for Victims and Survivors for Northern Ireland (CVSNI)
    - Commissioner for Survivors of Institutional Childhood Abuse (COSICA)
    - Equality Commission for Northern Ireland (ECNI)
    - Maze Long Kesh Development Corporation (MLKDC)
    - Northern Ireland Community Relations Council (CRC)
    - Northern Ireland Judicial Appointments Commission (NIJAC)
    - Office of Identity and Cultural Expression (OICE)
      - Irish Language Commissioner
      - Commissioner for the Ulster-Scots and the Ulster-British Tradition
    - Strategic Investment Board (SIB)
    - Victims and Survivors Service (VSS)
  - Other Bodies:
    - Commissioner for Public Appointments for Northern Ireland (CPANI)
    - Historical Institutional Abuse Redress Board
    - North/South Ministerial Council Joint Secretariat (North)
    - Office of the Attorney General for Northern Ireland
    - Victims' Payments Board
- Department of Agriculture, Environment and Rural Affairs (DAERA)
  - Executive Agencies:
    - Forest Service Northern Ireland
    - Northern Ireland Environment Agency (NIEA)
  - Non-Departmental Public Bodies:
    - Agri-Food and Biosciences Institute (AFBI)
    - Agricultural Wages Board for Northern Ireland (AWB)
    - Livestock & Meat Commission for Northern Ireland (LMC)
    - Northern Ireland Fishery Harbour Authority (NIFHA)
  - Advisory Bodies:
    - Council for Nature Conservation and the Countryside (CNCC)
  - Other Bodies:
    - College of Agriculture, Food and Rural Enterprise (CAFRE)
- Department for Communities (DfC)
  - Child Maintenance Service
  - Northern Ireland Sites and Monuments Record (NISMR)
  - Public Record Office of Northern Ireland (PRONI)
  - Non-Departmental Public Bodies:
    - Armagh Observatory and Armagh Planetarium
    - Arts Council of Northern Ireland
    - Charity Commission for Northern Ireland (CCNI)
    - Commissioner for Older People for Northern Ireland (COPNI)
    - Libraries Northern Ireland (Libraries NI)
    - Local Government Staff Commission
    - National Museums and Galleries of Northern Ireland (National Museums NI)
    - Northern Ireland Commissioner for Children and Young People (NICCY)
    - Northern Ireland Local Government Officers' Superannuation Committee (NILGOSC)
    - Northern Ireland Museums Council
    - Sport Northern Ireland (Sport NI)
  - Advisory Bodies:
    - Charities Advisory Committee
    - Historic Buildings Council
    - Historic Monuments Council (HMC)
    - Ministerial Advisory Group on Architecture and Built Environment (MAG)
  - Public Corporations:
    - Northern Ireland Housing Executive (NIHE)
    - Ulster Supported Employment Limited (USEL)
  - Other Bodies:
    - Local Government Boundaries Commissioner for Northern Ireland
    - Office of the Discretionary Support Commissioner (ODSC)
    - Rent Assessment Panel
    - Vaughan's Charitable Trust
- Department of Education (DE)
  - Non-Departmental Public Bodies:
    - Comhairle na Gaelscolaíochta (CnaG)
    - Council for Catholic Maintained Schools (CCMS)
    - Council for the Curriculum, Examinations and Assessment (CCEA)
    - Controlled Schools' Support Council (CSSC)
    - Education Authority (EA)
    - General Teaching Council for Northern Ireland (GTCNI)
    - Middletown Centre for Autism (MCA)
    - Northern Ireland Council for Integrated Education (NICIE)
  - Tribunals:
    - Exceptional Circumstances Body
- Department for the Economy (DfE)
  - Geological Survey of Northern Ireland
  - Non-Departmental Public Bodies:
    - Construction Industry Training Board Northern Ireland (CITB-NI)
    - General Consumer Council for Northern Ireland (GCCNI)
    - Health and Safety Executive for Northern Ireland (HSENI)
    - Invest Northern Ireland (Invest NI)
    - Labour Relations Agency (LRA)
    - Northern Ireland Screen (NIS)
    - Tourism Northern Ireland (Tourism NI)
  - Tribunals:
    - Office of The Industrial Tribunals and The Fair Employment Tribunal (OITFET)
  - Public Corporations:
    - Harland and Wolff (residual)
  - Further Education Colleges:
    - Belfast Metropolitan College
    - Northern Regional College
    - North West Regional College
    - Southern Regional College
    - South Eastern Regional College
    - South West College
  - Higher Education Institutes:
    - Open University (in Northern Ireland)
    - Queen's University Belfast
      - St. Mary's University College
      - Stranmillis University College
    - Ulster University
- Department of Finance (DoF)
  - Land and Property Services (LPS)
    - Ordnance Survey of Northern Ireland (OSNI)
  - Procurement Board
  - Executive Agencies:
    - Northern Ireland Statistics and Research Agency (NISRA)
  - Non-Departmental Public Bodies:
    - Civil Service Appeals Board (CSAB)
    - Legal Services Oversight Commissioner for Northern Ireland (LSOC)
    - Northern Ireland Building Regulations Advisory Committee (NIBRAC)
    - Northern Ireland Civil Service Pension Board (NICSPB)
    - Northern Ireland Fiscal Council (NI Fiscal Council)
    - Statistics Advisory Committee (SAC)
- Department of Health (DoH)
  - Executive Agencies:
    - Public Health Agency
  - Health and Social Care Trusts:
    - Belfast Health and Social Care Trust (BHSCT)
    - Northern Health and Social Care Trust (NHSCT)
    - South Eastern Health and Social Care Trust (SEHSCT)
    - Southern Health and Social Care Trust (SHSCT)
    - Western Health and Social Care Trust (WHSCT)
    - Northern Ireland Ambulance Service Health and Social Care Trust (NIAS)
  - Health and Social Care Bodies:
    - Children's Court Guardian Agency for Northern Ireland
    - Northern Ireland Blood Transfusion Service (NIBTS)
    - Northern Ireland Medical and Dental Training Agency (NIMDTA)
    - Regional Business Services Organisation (BSO)
    - Patient and Client Council (PCC)
  - Non-Departmental Public Bodies:
    - Northern Ireland Fire and Rescue Service (NIFRS)
    - Northern Ireland Practice and Education Council for Nursing and Midwifery (NIPEC)
    - Northern Ireland Social Care Council (NISCC)
    - Regulation and Quality Improvement Authority (RQIA)
  - Other Bodies:
    - Northern Ireland Clinical Excellence Awards Committee
    - Poisons Board
    - Safeguarding Board for Northern Ireland
- Department for Infrastructure (DfI)
  - DfI Rivers
  - DfI Roads
  - Executive Agencies:
    - Driver and Vehicle Agency (DVA)
  - Non-Departmental Public Bodies:
    - Drainage Council for Northern Ireland
  - Public Corporations:
    - Northern Ireland Transport Holding Company (NITHCo, trades as Translink)
    - Northern Ireland Water (NI Water)
  - Trust Ports:
    - Belfast Harbour Commissioners
    - Londonderry Port and Harbour Commissioners
    - Warrenpoint Harbour Authority
- Department of Justice (DoJ)
  - Executive Agencies:
    - Forensic Science Northern Ireland
    - Legal Services Agency Northern Ireland
    - Northern Ireland Courts and Tribunals Service
    - Northern Ireland Prison Service
    - Youth Justice Agency of Northern Ireland
  - Non-Departmental Public Bodies:
    - Criminal Justice Inspection Northern Ireland
    - Northern Ireland Police Fund
    - Northern Ireland Policing Board
    - Police Ombudsman for Northern Ireland
    - Police Rehabilitation and Retraining Trust
    - Police Service of Northern Ireland (PSNI)
    - Probation Board for Northern Ireland (PBNI)
    - Royal Ulster Constabulary George Cross Foundation
  - Other Bodies:
    - Planning Appeals Commission
    - Prisoner Ombudsman for Northern Ireland
    - Water Appeals Commission

=== Non-Ministerial Departments ===
- Northern Ireland Authority for Utility Regulation (Utility Regulator)
- Public Prosecution Service for Northern Ireland (PPSNI)

== Local government ==
=== Local authorities ===
- Antrim and Newtownabbey Borough Council
- Armagh, Banbridge and Craigavon District Council
- Belfast City Council
- Causeway Coast and Glens District Council
- Derry and Strabane District Council
- Fermanagh and Omagh District Council
- Lisburn and Castlereagh District Council
- Mid and East Antrim District Council
- Mid-Ulster District Council
- Newry, Mourne and Down District Council
- North Down and Ards District Council

== UK Government ==
The following departments of the United Kingdom government and UK-wide public bodies operate in Northern Ireland.

Northern Ireland Office (NIO)

The NIO is the UK department responsible for Northern Ireland affairs and is led by the Secretary of State for Northern Ireland, who represents Northern Ireland interests at Cabinet level. It is responsible for the following public bodies:

- Boundary Commission for Northern Ireland
- Northern Ireland Human Rights Commission
- Parades Commission

Executive agencies (by department)

- Department for Business and Trade:
  - Companies House
- Home Office:
  - HM Passport Office
  - UK Visas and Immigration
- Department for Transport:
  - Maritime and Coastguard Agency

Non-departmental public bodies (outside NIO, by department)

- Department for Science, Innovation and Technology:
  - Information Commissioner's Office

Non-ministerial departments (answerable to Parliament)

- Food Standards Agency
- HM Revenue and Customs

Other regulators

- Bank of England
- Electoral Commission
- Office of Communications

Defence and security services

- British Armed Forces (principally the British Army)
- Security Service (MI5)

Public bodies operating from Great Britain

Several public bodies have a UK-wide remit for reserved and excepted matters in Northern Ireland but operate from Great Britain.

- Department for Culture, Media and Sport:
  - National Lottery Commission
- Ministry of Defence:
  - United Kingdom Hydrographic Office
- Department for Energy Security and Net Zero:
  - Nuclear Decommissioning Authority
  - United Kingdom Atomic Energy Authority
- Department for Environment, Food and Rural Affairs:
  - Rural Payments Agency
  - Sea Fish Industry Authority
- Department of Health and Social Care:
  - Human Fertilisation and Embryology Authority
  - Human Tissue Authority
- Department for Science, Innovation and Technology:
  - Intellectual Property Office
  - Met Office
  - UK Research and Innovation
- Department for Transport:
  - Air Accidents Investigation Branch
  - Civil Aviation Authority
  - Marine Accident Investigation Branch
  - Rail Accident Investigation Branch
- HM Treasury:
  - Crown Estate
  - Financial Conduct Authority
  - Royal Mint
- Non-ministerial departments:
  - Competition and Markets Authority
  - Serious Fraud Office

== North/South Ministerial Council ==
The North/South Ministerial Council (NSMC) consists of Northern Ireland Executive and Irish Government ministers, and is designed to encourage co-operation between the two jurisdictions on Ireland. The similar British-Irish Council, which consists of ministers from all countries of the British Isles (also known as Britain and Ireland), has no related public bodies.

NSMC cross-border bodies:

- Food Safety Promotion Board
- Foyle, Carlingford and Irish Lights Commission
  - Loughs Agency
  - Lights Agency (proposed)
- Institute of Public Health (all-Ireland)
- InterTradeIreland
- North/South Language Body
  - Foras na Gaeilge
  - Tha Boord o Ulstèr-Scotch (Ulster-Scots Agency)
- Special European Union Programmes Body (SEUPB)
- Tourism Ireland
- Waterways Ireland

== External organisations ==
- Irish Department of Foreign Affairs (through British-Irish Intergovernmental Conference joint secretariat)
- United States Department of State (US Consulate-General, Belfast)

== Other public bodies ==
- Civic Forum for Northern Ireland (suspended)
- Civil Service Commissioners for Northern Ireland
- East–West Council
- Electoral Office for Northern Ireland (EONI)
- Intertrade UK
- Northern Ireland Audit Office (NIAO)
- Northern Ireland Public Services Ombudsman (NIPSO)

== See also ==
- Education in Northern Ireland
- Health and Social Care in Northern Ireland
- Local government in Northern Ireland
- Northern Ireland Assembly
- Northern Ireland Civil Service
- Northern Ireland Executive
- Northern Ireland Office
- Reserved matters
