= All-Ireland =

Term referring to all of Ireland

The Four Provinces Flag of Ireland contains the flags of Ireland's four traditional constituent provinces: (clockwise, from the top left) Munster, Connacht, Leinster, and Ulster

All-Ireland (sometimes All-Island) is a term used to describe organisations and events whose interests extend over the entire island of Ireland, as opposed to the separate jurisdictions of the Republic of Ireland and Northern Ireland. "All-Ireland" is most frequently used to refer to sporting teams or events for the entire island, but also has related meanings in politics and religion.

== In sports ==
Flag used to represent all-Ireland by the men's and women's field hockey teams

Flag used to represent all-Ireland by the men's and women's rugby union teams

Flag used to represent all-Ireland by the men's and women's cricket teams

Many high profile modern sports were codified within the United Kingdom at the end of the nineteenth century, during a period of British imperial dominance, and while the whole of Ireland was a constituent country of the United Kingdom. As such, early international competition first featured the four constituent countries of the UK; England, Scotland, Wales and Ireland, before spreading to other parts of the Empire. For this reason, in many sporting contexts, the UK does not compete as one national team, and almost never under the name 'United Kingdom'. (The exception is Olympic sports, which were first reorganised by French and Greek bodies, in which the UK competes as Great Britain.)

When the Irish Free State left the United Kingdom in 1923, many of the existing 'Ireland' teams remained united, covering both jurisdictions. These sports are described as being organised on an All-Ireland or all-island basis. The most notable sport not to follow this trend was association football.

"The All-Ireland", with the definite article, is often used as an abbreviation of All-Ireland Championship, within Gaelic Games, most specifically:

- All-Ireland Senior Football Championship in Gaelic football
- All-Ireland Senior Hurling Championship in hurling.

Many other sports are organised on an all-Ireland basis, most notably rugby union. Other such sports include American football, basketball, boxing, cricket, curling, Gaelic games, golf, hockey, lawn bowls, korfball, Quidditch and rugby league. The international team is usually referred to simply as "Ireland". Others are organised primarily on an all-Ireland basis, but with both "Ireland" and "Great Britain" international teams, in which case participants from Northern Ireland may opt for either — these include tennis, swimming, athletics, rowing and any events at the Olympics.

A small number of sports have separate Northern Ireland and (Republic of) Ireland organisations and teams, most notably association football. For several years two separate organisations — the Irish Football Association in Belfast, Northern Ireland (which undisputedly represented the whole island before the partition) and the new Football Association of Ireland in Dublin, Ireland — both named their teams 'Ireland'. This confusing situation continued until FIFA settled the dispute by forcing each side to adopt a distinguishable name — producing teams called Northern Ireland and Republic of Ireland. Prior to FIFA's intervention, many footballers played for both Ireland teams.

Other sports with separate Northern Ireland administration and international recognition include netball and snooker.

Similarly to the example of Gaelic games, the term may be used in reference to annual competitions in certain Irish traditional music and art forms:

- All-Ireland Fleadh in Irish music (see Fleadh Cheoil)
  - List of All-Ireland Fleadh champions in traditional Irish music
- All-Ireland Feis in Irish dance
- The All Ireland Talent Show, a 2009–2011 television show

== In religion ==
It is also used in the title Primate of All Ireland, the senior clergyman in each of the Roman Catholic Church and the Church of Ireland:

- the Roman Catholic Archbishop of Armagh, the Catholic Primate of All Ireland
- the Church of Ireland's Archbishop of Armagh, the Anglican Primate of All Ireland

Most Christian denominations are organised on an All-Ireland basis, with a single organisation for both the Republic of Ireland and Northern Ireland.

== In politics ==
In Irish republicanism, expression "Counties of Ireland" is often used instead: 32 as distinct from the 26 traditional counties of the Republic and the remaining 6 of Northern Ireland. Those who subscribe to Irish republican legitimatism, the concept that the Irish Republic continues to exist, refer to the All-Ireland Republic to distinguish from the 26 county Republic of Ireland.

Republican Sinn Féin hold an Eve of All Ireland Rally ahead of the senior All-Ireland Football Championship final on O'Connell Street, Dublin.

The term is also sometimes used to refer to the cross-border agencies established by agreement between the Republic of Ireland and United Kingdom governments, and whose powers extend to both jurisdictions on the island: North/South Ministerial Council, Waterways Ireland, Food Safety Promotion Board, Special European Union Programmes Body, The North/South Language Body, InterTradeIreland, Tourism Ireland, and the Commissioners of Irish Lights and other non-profit organisations organised on an All-Ireland basis, such as Uplift (Ireland).

Counties of Ireland differentiates the 32 counties, encompassing both the 26 traditional counties of the Republic of Ireland and the additional 6 counties in Northern Ireland, from the 26 county Republic of Ireland recognized internationally. The term also refers to cross-border agencies established through agreements between the Republic of Ireland and the United Kingdom governments. These agencies, such as the North/South Ministerial Council, Waterways Ireland, Tourism Ireland, and others, possess powers that extend to both jurisdictions on the island, promoting cooperation and collaboration on an All-Ireland basis in various fields.

== See also ==
- List of flags of Ireland § Island of Ireland
- Sport in Ireland
- Sport in Northern Ireland
