= VSS =

VSS may refer to:

== Organizations ==
- Swiss Student Union
- Vegetarian Society (Singapore)
- Vernon Secondary School, a high school in Vernon, B.C.
- Veronis Suhler Stevenson, media company
- Victims and Survivors Service, Northern Ireland public body
- Voluntary Sports Societies of the Soviet Union
- FC VSS Košice, a Slovak football club

== Science and technology ==
- Variable structure system, a class of discontinuous nonlinear systems
- Vehicle speed sensor, in automobiles
- Verifiable secret sharing, a cryptographic primitive
- Video surveillance system, cameras and other systems combined to allow remote video monitoring
- Visual SourceSafe, a source control software system produced by Microsoft
- Vital signs stable, in List of medical abbreviations: V
- Volatile suspended solids, a water quality measure
- Voltage symmetrization system in power engineering
- Volume Snapshot Service, or Shadow Copy, in Microsoft Windows
- Visual Surround Sound / Visual Surround System : when surround sound is created and perceived with less sources than real surround system.
- Visual Snow Syndrome, a neurological condition
- VSS (voltage), V_{SS}, a negative power-supply pin in FET ICs

== Other ==
- SNV (typeface), also called VSS
- The VSS, an American rock band
- Virgin Space Ship, name prefix for Virgin Galactic's spacecraft
- VSS Vintorez, a Soviet sniper rifle
- VSTOL Support Ship, a proposed 1970s U.S. Navy light carrier
