= Ulster Scots =

Ulster Scots, may refer to:

- The Ulster-Scot, newspaper
- Ulster-Scots Agency, body promoting Ulster-Scots
- Ulster-Scots Community Network, organisation
- Ulster Scots people
- Ulster Scots dialect
