= CJI =

CJI may refer to:

- Chamalal language of the North Caucasus (ISO 639-3 code: cji)
- Chief Justice of India
- Craig Jones Invitational, a wrestling tournament in the United States
- Criminal Justice Inspection Northern Ireland, a government agency
