= Chris Ryder =

Chris Ryder may refer to:

- Chris Ryder (squash player) (born 1980), English squash player
- Chris Ryder (journalist) (1947–2020), Northern Irish journalist and author
