= Department of Justice (Northern Ireland) =

Northern Irish government department

- Irish: An Roinn Dlí agus Cirt; Ulster-Scots: Männystrie o tha Laa

Department overview
- Formed: 12 April 2010
- Preceding Department: General justice policy: Ministry of Home Affairs (1921–1972) Northern Ireland Office (1972–2010) Courts: Lord Chancellor of Ireland (1921–1922) Lord Chancellor's Department (1922–2003) Department for Constitutional Affairs (2003–2007) Ministry of Justice (2007–2010)
- Jurisdiction: Northern Ireland
- Headquarters: Castle Buildings, Stormont Estate, Belfast, BT4 3SG
- Employees: 2,493 (September 2011)
- Annual budget: £1,213.1 million (current) & £78.3 million (capital) for 2011–12
- Minister responsible: Naomi Long
- Department executive: Hugh Widdis, Permanent Secretary
- Website: www.justice-ni.gov.uk

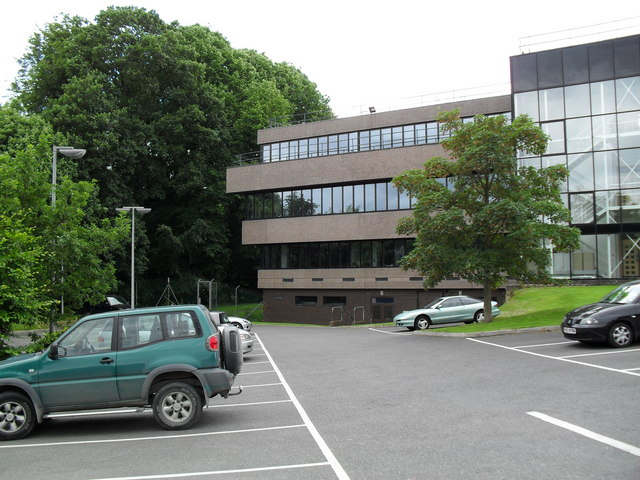
Castle Buildings, headquarters of the Department of Justice

The Department of Justice (Irish: An Roinn Dlí agus Cirt, Ulster-Scots: Männystrie o tha Laa) is a government department in the Northern Ireland Executive, which was established on 12 April 2010 as part of the devolution of justice matters to the Northern Ireland Assembly. The department's Permanent Secretary is Hugh Widdis. It combines the previous work of the Northern Ireland Office and the Ministry of Justice, within the United Kingdom Government, which were respectively responsible for justice policy and the administration of courts in Northern Ireland.

== History ==
The partition of Ireland created a separate jurisdiction of Northern Ireland in June 1921. A local Ministry of Home Affairs, initially led by Dawson Bates, was established at that time and oversaw most aspects of justice policy until the introduction of direct rule in March 1972. The Northern Ireland Office, led by the Secretary of State for Northern Ireland, was subsequently responsible for security and political affairs during the remainder of the Troubles.

The post of Lord Chancellor of Ireland was abolished in 1922 and subsequently replaced in Northern Ireland by the Lord High Chancellor of Great Britain. His supporting department and the subsequent Department for Constitutional Affairs (2003–2007) oversaw the courts until the formation of the Ministry of Justice in May 2007.

Most aspects of social and economic policy were devolved to the Northern Ireland Executive in December 1999. The devolution of policing and justice was pledged in the St Andrews Agreement (of October 2006) and the Hillsborough Castle Agreement (of February 2010) and occurred in April 2010.

In October 2018, the department launched the "Ending the Harm" campaign to end paramilitary punishment attacks, a form of vigilante justice by paramilitary groups that continues after the Troubles.

== Minister ==
The Minister of Justice is elected by a cross-community vote in the Northern Ireland Assembly, unlike all other Northern Ireland Executive posts, which are either allocated by the d'Hondt method or appointed directly by the largest parties (i.e. the First Minister and the deputy First Minister).

The exception was made to resolve a dispute between the Democratic Unionist Party (DUP) and Sinn Féin. The Alliance Party of Northern Ireland successfully nominated its party leader, David Ford, on 12 April 2010. Ford was re-elected to the position on 16 May 2011 and was Minister until 2016. On 25 May 2016, independent unionist Claire Sugden was elected the new Minister of Justice, following the Alliance Party's refusal of the justice ministry. Sugden's tenure as minister ended on 26 January 2017, when the Northern Ireland Executive was dissolved following further disputes between the DUP and Sinn Féin.

Minister	Image	Party	Took office	Left office
David Ford		Alliance	12 April 2010	6 May 2016
Claire Sugden	Naomi Long	Independent	25 May 2016	26 January 2017
Office suspended
Naomi Long	Naomi Long	Alliance	11 January 2020	27 October 2022
Office suspended
Naomi Long	Naomi Long	Alliance	3 February 2024	Incumbent

== Aim ==
Under the Programme for Government for 2016–2020, the department has been tasked with the outcome of "a safe community where we respect the law, and each other”. Its objectives are based on the concept of 'problem-solving justice' which seeks to drive forward "new and more imaginative" strategies, which will seek to address the underlying causes of offending behaviour.

== Structure ==
The Department of Justice's headquarters is located in Castle Buildings in Belfast. Its remit includes the following executive agencies:

- the Northern Ireland Prison Service
- the Northern Ireland Courts and Tribunals Service
- the Legal Services Agency for Northern Ireland
- the Youth Justice Agency
- Forensic Science Northern Ireland

The department also oversees the following non-departmental public bodies:

- the Northern Ireland Policing Board
- the Office of the Police Ombudsman for Northern Ireland
- the Office of the Northern Ireland Prisoner Ombudsman
- the Probation Board for Northern Ireland
- Criminal Justice Inspection Northern Ireland
- the Northern Ireland Law Commission (non-operational since April 2015)
- the Northern Ireland Police Fund
- the Royal Ulster Constabulary George Cross Foundation
- the Police Rehabilitation and Retraining Trust Advisory
- the Advisory Committee on Justices of the Peace

The Police Service of Northern Ireland is operationally independent and accountable to the Northern Ireland Policing Board; the Minister of Justice has overall responsibility for legislation on policing.

== Responsibilities ==
The Department of Justice is responsible for most everyday policing and justice powers in Northern Ireland.

In 2009, responsibility for interface areas and peacewalls passed from the Northern Ireland Office to the Minister of Justice. As such, the Department of Justice is responsible for the policy of 'removal of all peacewalls in Northern Ireland by 2023'.

The Northern Ireland Act 1998 (Devolution of Policing and Justice Functions) Order 2010 (SI 2010/976) outlines the policy areas transferred to the Northern Ireland Assembly. These include:

- criminal law
- policing
- prosecution
- public order
- courts
- prisons and probation
- criminal history disclosure (the AccessNI service)

Some justice matters remain reserved to Westminster, with the Assembly's agreement e.g. the prerogative of mercy in terrorism cases, illicit drug classification, the National Crime Agency, the accommodation of prisoners in separated conditions within the Northern Ireland Prison Service, parades and the security of explosives.

In addition, some justice matters remain excepted and devolution was either not discussed or not considered feasible: extradition (as an international relations matter), military justice (as a defence matter), the enforcement of immigration law, and national security (including intelligence services).

The Department of Justice's main counterparts in the United Kingdom Government are:

- the Home Office (on policing, drugs and public order);
- the Ministry of Justice (on criminal law, courts, prisons, probation);
- the Northern Ireland Office (on national security in Northern Ireland).

In the Irish Government, its main counterpart is the Department of Justice. A considerable proportion of law enforcement in Northern Ireland (and media coverage of policing and justice stories) is taken up with unresolved cases arising from the Troubles, continuing paramilitary activity and tensions caused by sectarian division. The border results in differences in law between Northern Ireland (the only UK jurisdiction with an international land border) and the Republic of Ireland, which are exploited through smuggling and other forms of crime. The border has become an external border of the European Union, following Brexit.

== Finance ==
The 2016–2017 Northern Ireland Executive budget allocated a £1,050.5 million resource budget to the Department of Justice:

- £746 million for safer communities (mainly the Police Service of Northern Ireland budget)
- £93.5 million for the Legal Services Agency
- £93.3 million for the Northern Ireland Prison Service
- £38.6 million for the Northern Ireland Courts and Tribunals Service
- £16.3 million for the Probation Board
- £16.2 million for the Youth Justice Agency
- £15.2 million for compensation services
- £15 million for access to justice
- £8.6 million for the Police Ombudsman
- £6.2 million for the Policing Board
- £1.1 million for Criminal Justice Inspection
- £500,000 for forensic science

This represented an increase from the previous resource budget of £1,023.9 million.

The department's capital budget was £58 million, allocated as follows:

- £30 million for safer communities
- £17 million for the Northern Ireland Prison Service
- £4.7 million for the Legal Services Agency
- £2.7 million for access to justice
- £1.8 million for Northern Ireland Courts and Tribunals Service
- £800,000 for compensation services
- £800,000 for forensic science
- £200,000 for the Youth Justice Agency

The Northern Ireland Executive was also provided with £32 million for national security in relation to Northern Ireland, £30 million for legacy bodies to deal with the Troubles (not yet established), £5 million to tackle paramilitary activity, and £800,000 to assist with the monitoring of paramilitary activity.

== Legislation ==
Since the devolution of policing and justice, the Northern Ireland Assembly has enacted seven acts mainly relating to justice policy:

- Justice Act (Northern Ireland) 2011
- Criminal Justice Act (Northern Ireland) 2013
- Legal Aid and Coroners' Courts Act (Northern Ireland) 2014
- Human Trafficking and Exploitation (Criminal Justice and Support for Victims) Act (Northern Ireland) 2015 (c. 2 (N.I.))
- Justice Act (Northern Ireland) 2015
- Legal Complaints and Regulation Act (Northern Ireland) 2016
- Justice Act (Northern Ireland) 2016

Department of Justice Act (Northern Ireland) 2010 (Note: Section 3(1).)
- Act of the Northern Ireland Assembly
- Northern Ireland Assembly
- Long title: An Act to provide for the establishment of the Department of Justice and for the appointment of the Minister to be in charge of that Department.
- Citation: 2010 c. 3 (N.I.)
- Territorial extent: Northern Ireland

Dates
- Royal assent: 12 February 2010
- Commencement: 10 April 2010 (sections 1(1) to (4) and 2); 12 April 2010 (section 1(5) and the schedule); (Note: Section 3(2). The Department of Justice (2010 Act) (Commencement) Order (Northern Ireland) 2010 (SI 2010/147).)
Other legislation
Amends	Judicature (Northern Ireland) Act 1978; Social Security Administration (Northern Ireland) Act 1992; Northern Ireland Act 2009
Amended by	Departments Act (Northern Ireland) 2016

Status: Amended

Text of statute as originally enacted

Text of the Department of Justice Act (Northern Ireland) 2010 as in force today (including any amendments) within the United Kingdom, from legislation.gov.uk.

In addition, the Department of Justice Act (Northern Ireland) 2010 (c. 3 (N.I.)) formally established the department.

== See also ==
- Justice ministry
- List of government departments and agencies in Northern Ireland
- Northern Ireland Executive
- Northern Ireland law
- Politics of Northern Ireland
