= Secretary of State for Northern Ireland =

Member of the Cabinet of the United Kingdom

United Kingdom Secretary of State for Northern Ireland
- Royal Arms of His Majesty's Government

- Incumbent; Chris Bryant since 20 July 2026
- Style: Northern Ireland Secretary (informal); The Right Honourable(within the UK and Commonwealth)
- Type: Minister of the Crown
- Status: Secretary of State
- Member of: Cabinet; Privy Council
- Reports to: The Prime Minister
- Residence: Hillsborough Castle
- Seat: Westminster
- Nominator: The Prime Minister
- Appointer: The Monarch; (on the advice of the Prime Minister)
- Term length: At His Majesty's pleasure
- Precursor: Lord Lieutenant of Ireland; Governor of Northern Ireland
- Formation: 24 March 1972
- First holder: William Whitelaw
- Deputy: Minister of State for Northern Ireland; Parliamentary Under-Secretary of State for Northern Ireland
- Salary: £159,038 per annum (2022) (including £86,584 MP salary)
- Website: www.nio.gov.uk

The secretary of state for Northern Ireland (Irish: Rúnaí Stáit Thuaisceart Éireann; Ulster Scots: Secretar o State for Norlin Airlan), also referred to as Northern Ireland secretary or SoSNI, is a secretary of state in the Government of the United Kingdom, with overall responsibility for the Northern Ireland Office. The officeholder is a member of the Cabinet of the United Kingdom. The incumbent is Chris Bryant who took office on 20 July 2026.

The officeholder works alongside the other Northern Ireland Office ministers. The corresponding shadow minister is the shadow secretary of state for Northern Ireland.

Unlike the secretaries of state for Wales and Scotland, which are generally held by Welsh and Scottish MPs, the position has never been held by an MP in a Northern Irish seat. It is instead held by Conservative and Labour Party MPs in Britain. This is due to the fact that Labour does not field candidates in Northern Ireland, and the Conservatives have never won a seat there.

== History ==
=== Background ===
Historically, the principal ministers for Irish (and subsequently Northern Ireland) affairs in the UK Government and its predecessors were:

- the lord lieutenant of Ireland (c. 1171–1922)
- the chief secretary for Ireland (1560–1922)
- the home secretary (1922–1972)

In August 1969, for example, Home Secretary James Callaghan approved the sending of British Army soldiers to Northern Ireland. Scotland and Wales were represented by the roles of Secretary of State for Scotland and Secretary of State for Wales from 1885 and 1964 respectively, but Northern Ireland remained separate, owing to the devolved Government of Northern Ireland and Parliament of Northern Ireland.

=== During the Troubles (1972-1998) ===
The office of Secretary of State for Northern Ireland was created after the Northern Ireland government (at Stormont) was first suspended and then abolished following widespread civil strife. The British government was increasingly concerned that Stormont was losing control of the situation. On 30 March 1972, direct rule from Westminster was introduced. The secretary of state filled three roles which existed under the previous Stormont regime:

- the governor of Northern Ireland (the nominal head of the executive and representative of the British monarch)
- the prime minister of Northern Ireland (in the present day, a role filled by the first minister of Northern Ireland and deputy first minister of Northern Ireland acting jointly)
- the minister of home affairs (in the present day, a role filled by the minister of justice).

Direct rule was seen as a temporary measure, with a power-sharing devolution preferred as the solution, and was annually renewed by a vote in Parliament.

The Sunningdale Agreement in 1973 resulted in the brief existence of a power-sharing Northern Ireland Executive from 1 January 1974, which was ended by the loyalist Ulster Workers' Council strike on 28 May 1974. The strikers opposed the power-sharing and all-Ireland aspects of the new administration.

The Northern Ireland Constitutional Convention (1975–1976) and Northern Ireland Assembly (1982–1986) were unsuccessful in restoring devolved government. After the Anglo-Irish Agreement on 15 November 1985, the UK Government and Irish Government co-operated more closely on security and political matters.

=== Since devolution (From 1999) ===
Following the Belfast Agreement (also known as the Good Friday Agreement), devolution returned to Northern Ireland on 2 December 1999. This removed many of the duties of the secretary of state and devolved them to the locally elected Northern Ireland Executive. The secretary of state retained responsibility for policing and justice until most of those powers were devolved on 12 April 2010, after the Hillsborough Castle Agreement.

Prior to 2007 the devolved administration was suspended several times and direct rule was imposed. The lengthiest of these suspensions was due to Stormontgate, between 15 October 2002 and 8 May 2007. On each of these occasions, the responsibilities of the ministers in the Executive then returned to the secretary of state and his ministers. The secretary of state was also heavily involved in the negotiations with all parties to restore devolved government. While the executive has on occasion been suspended since that time, direct rule has not been imposed as the powers to do so were removed by the St Andrews Agreement and it would today require new legislation for Westminster to take that action.

The secretary of state is today generally limited to representing Northern Ireland in the UK cabinet, overseeing the operation of the devolved administration and a number of reserved and excepted matters which remain the sole competence of the UK Government e.g. security, human rights, certain public inquiries and the administration of elections. The secretary of state officially resides in Hillsborough Castle, which was previously the official residence of the governor of Northern Ireland, and remains the royal residence of the monarch in Northern Ireland. The secretary of state exercises their duties through, and is administratively supported by, the Northern Ireland Office (NIO).

In 2020 Professor Robert Hazell, of University College London, has suggested replacing the office. He proposed merging the offices of Secretary of State for Northern Ireland, for Scotland and for Wales into one secretary of state for the Union, in a department into which Rodney Brazier has suggested adding a minister of state for England with responsibility for English local government.

== Role in potential Irish unification ==
The Secretary of State for Northern Ireland has the power to call a referendum on Irish unification. This was set out in the Northern Ireland Act 1998, as part of the Northern Ireland Peace Process. The office must call a referendum if "at any time it appears likely... that a majority of those voting would express a wish that Northern Ireland should cease to be part of the United Kingdom and form part of a united Ireland”.

The exact criteria to call one is left vague in the text; it references public opinion on the subject but does not provide a concrete method to measure it. It has been characterised as a simple "judgement call" on the part of the office by Taoiseach Micheál Martin, as the law currently stands. This has been the subject of years of debate in Ireland.

== List of secretaries of state for Northern Ireland ==
Colour key
Conservative Labour

Secretary of state	Term of office		Party	Prime Minister
William Whitelaw; MP for Penrith and The Border	24 March 1972	2 December 1973	Conservative	Edward Heath
Francis Pym; MP for Cambridgeshire	2 December 1973	4 March 1974	Conservative	Edward Heath
Merlyn Rees; MP for Leeds South	5 March 1974	10 September 1976	Labour	Harold Wilson
Roy Mason; MP for Barnsley	10 September 1976	4 May 1979	Labour	James Callaghan
Humphrey Atkins; MP for Spelthorne	5 May 1979	14 September 1981	Conservative	Margaret Thatcher
Jim Prior; MP for Lowestoft (until 1983); MP for Waveney (from 1983)	14 September 1981	11 September 1984	Conservative	Margaret Thatcher
Douglas Hurd; MP for Witney	11 September 1984	3 September 1985	Conservative	Margaret Thatcher
Tom King; MP for Bridgwater	3 September 1985	24 July 1989	Conservative	Margaret Thatcher
Peter Brooke; MP for Cities of London and Westminster South	24 July 1989	10 April 1992	Conservative	Margaret Thatcher
Peter Brooke; MP for Cities of London and Westminster South	24 July 1989	10 April 1992	Conservative	John Major
Patrick Mayhew; MP for Tunbridge Wells	10 April 1992	2 May 1997	Conservative	John Major
Mo Mowlam; MP for Redcar	3 May 1997	11 October 1999	Labour	Tony Blair
Peter Mandelson; MP for Hartlepool	11 October 1999	24 January 2001	Labour	Tony Blair
John Reid; MP for Hamilton North and Bellshill	25 January 2001	24 October 2002	Labour	Tony Blair
Paul Murphy; MP for Torfaen	24 October 2002	6 May 2005	Labour	Tony Blair
Peter Hain; MP for Neath (also Welsh Secretary)	6 May 2005	28 June 2007	Labour	Tony Blair
Shaun Woodward; MP for St Helens South	28 June 2007	11 May 2010	Labour	Gordon Brown
Owen Paterson; MP for North Shropshire	12 May 2010	4 September 2012	Conservative	David Cameron (Coalition)
Theresa Villiers; MP for Chipping Barnet	4 September 2012	14 July 2016	Conservative	David Cameron (Coalition)
Theresa Villiers; MP for Chipping Barnet	4 September 2012	14 July 2016	Conservative	David Cameron (II)
James Brokenshire; MP for Old Bexley and Sidcup	14 July 2016	8 January 2018	Conservative	Theresa May (I)
James Brokenshire; MP for Old Bexley and Sidcup	14 July 2016	8 January 2018	Conservative	Theresa May (II)
Karen Bradley; MP for Staffordshire Moorlands	8 January 2018	24 July 2019	Conservative	Theresa May (II)
Julian Smith; MP for Skipton and Ripon	24 July 2019	13 February 2020	Conservative	Boris Johnson (I)
Julian Smith; MP for Skipton and Ripon	24 July 2019	13 February 2020	Conservative	Boris Johnson (II)
Brandon Lewis; MP for Great Yarmouth	13 February 2020	7 July 2022	Conservative	Boris Johnson (II)
Shailesh Vara; MP for North West Cambridgeshire	7 July 2022	6 September 2022	Conservative	Boris Johnson (II)
Chris Heaton-Harris; MP for Daventry	6 September 2022	5 July 2024	Conservative	Liz Truss (I)
Chris Heaton-Harris; MP for Daventry	6 September 2022	5 July 2024	Conservative	Rishi Sunak (I)
Hilary Benn; MP for Leeds South	5 July 2024	20 July 2026	Labour	Keir Starmer
Chris Bryant; MP for Rhondda and Ogmore	20 July 2026	Incumbent	Labour	Andy Burnham

== See also ==
- First Minister of Northern Ireland
- Great Seal of Northern Ireland
- Shadow Secretary of State for Northern Ireland
- Secretary of State (United Kingdom)
- Secretary of State for Scotland
- Secretary of State for Wales
- Chief Secretary for Ireland, office that existed until 1922
- Governor of Northern Ireland, office that existed from 1922 to 1973
