= North/South Ministerial Council =

Organization

- Irish: An Chomhairle Aireachta Thuaidh-Theas; Scots: North South Meinisterlie Council
- Abbreviation: NSMC
- Formation: 13 December 1999; 26 years ago
- Type: Intergovernmental organisation
- Legal status: British–Irish Agreement
- Headquarters: Armagh, Northern Ireland^{2}
- Coordinates: 54°21′00″N 6°39′20″W
- Region served: Ireland
- Website: www.northsouthministerialcouncil.org
- Remarks: ^{2} This is the location of the standing Joint Secretariat of the North/South Ministerial Council.

The North/South Ministerial Council (NSMC) (Irish: An Chomhairle Aireachta Thuaidh-Theas, Ulster-Scots: North South Meinisterlie Council) is a body established under the Good Friday Agreement to co-ordinate activity and exercise certain governmental powers across the whole island of Ireland.

The Council takes the form of meetings between ministers from both the Republic of Ireland and Northern Ireland and is responsible for twelve policy areas. Six of these areas are the responsibility of corresponding North/South Implementation Bodies. The body is based in the city of Armagh in Northern Ireland.

The North/South Ministerial Council and the Northern Ireland Assembly are "mutually inter-dependent" institutions: one cannot exist without the other. When the Northern Ireland Assembly is suspended, responsibility for areas of co-operation fall to the British-Irish Intergovernmental Conference.

== Organisation ==
The Ministerial Council consists of representatives of both the Northern Ireland Executive and the Government of Ireland. The Ministerial Council may meet in either a plenary or, more commonly, sectoral format. In a plenary meeting a Northern Ireland delegation is led by the First Minister and deputy First Minister of Northern Ireland while the Republic's delegation is led by the Taoiseach and Tánaiste.

A meeting in a sectoral format deals only with one particular policy area, and consists of the minister from Dublin with responsibility for the area under discussion, and two ministers from Northern Ireland (usually one unionist and one nationalist), including the minister with the relevant competence. The council is supported by a standing joint secretariat, consisting of members of the civil services of both Northern Ireland and the Republic.

The council also has occasional meetings in an "institutional" format to consider other business and technical matters, such as appointments to boards.

== Areas for co-operation ==
The council is responsible for twelve "areas for co-operation". Six of these are in areas where co-operation must be agreed together, but implemented separately in each jurisdiction. Six more are in areas where co-operation is agreed together and implemented through shared all-Ireland "implementation bodies".

Areas for co-operation where implementation is carried out separately:

- Agriculture: Common Agricultural Policy issues, animal and plant health, agricultural research and rural development.
- Education: Education for children with special needs, educational under-achievement, teacher qualifications and school, youth and teacher exchanges.
- Environment: Environmental protection, pollution, water-quality management and waste management.
- Health: Accident and emergency planning, co-operation on high-technology equipment, cancer research and health promotion.
- Tourism: The promotion of the island of Ireland as a tourist destination for overseas visitors via the establishment of a new company, known as Tourism Ireland.
- Transport: Co-operation on strategic transport planning including road and rail infrastructure and public transport services and road and rail safety.

The six all-Ireland implementation bodies are:

- Waterways Ireland: Management of specific and chiefly recreational inland waterways.
- Food Safety Promotion Board: Food safety awareness.
- Special European Union Programmes Body: Management and oversight of EU programmes and common chapters of the National Development Plan (Ireland) and the Northern Ireland Structural Funds Plan.
- The North/South Language Body: Promotion of the Irish and Ulster Scots languages through two separate agencies, Foras na Gaeilge (Irish) and Tha Boord o Ulstèr-Scotch (Ulster Scots).
- InterTradeIreland: all-Ireland trade and business development.
- Foyle, Carlingford and Irish Lights Commission: The management and development of Lough Foyle and Carlingford Lough and coastal lights through two separate agencies, The Loughs Agency and Lights Agency

Additional areas for co-operation may be added by agreement among the council and with the endorsement of the Northern Ireland Assembly and Oireachtas.

Originally, a new jointly owned agency, Lights Agency, was intended to replace the Commissioners of Irish Lights, which is funded from the UK Department for Transport-managed General Lighthouse Fund to provide coastal aids to navigation throughout the island of Ireland. However, complexities arising from the transfer of functions have meant that this has had to be reconsidered.

== Operation ==
Twenty-one plenary meetings were held between 1999 and 2015: one each year from 1999 to 2002, and 2007 to 2008; and on average two each year thereafter. Meetings alternate between north and south, usually in Armagh and Dublin. Sectoral meetings occur more frequently at various locations.

The level of co-operation differs across areas. For example, co-operation on tourism proceeded very rapidly (creating Tourism Ireland in 2000). On the other hand, there was initially little co-operation in the area of transport. At first because of resistance from the relevant minister in Northern Ireland and later because, after the restoration of the Council following suspension of the Northern Ireland Assembly, because the British and Irish governments had already done much of the work during a period of direct rule.

In 2007, the joint secretariat number 25 personnel, comprising 10 from Ireland and 15 from Northern Ireland. In 2010, the secretariat took up new, permanent office in Armagh. Budgets, staff numbers and headquarters for the six implementation bodies (including Tourism Ireland) in 2008 were as follows:

| Implementation body | Location | Staff | Budget (millions) |
|---|---|---|---|
| Waterways Ireland | Enniskillen | 345 | €50.9 |
| Food Safety Promotion Board | Cork | 27 | €10.2 |
| Special European Union Programmes Body | Belfast | 66 | €4.6 |
| InterTradeIreland | Newry | 44 | €17.1 |
| The North/South Language Body | Dublin and Belfast | 69 | €25.7 |
| Foyle, Carlingford and Irish Lights Commission | Derry and Carlingford | 47 | €8.5 |
| Tourism Ireland | Dublin and Coleraine | 160 | €78.6 |
| | | 758 | €195.6 |

== See also ==
- British-Irish Council
- British-Irish Intergovernmental Conference
- British–Irish Parliamentary Assembly
- East–West Council
- Prime Minister and Heads of Devolved Governments Council
- Northern Ireland Assembly
- North/South Inter-Parliamentary Association
