= HM Prison Hydebank Wood =

Women's prison in Belfast

Coordinates: 54.542°N 5.927°W

His Majesty's Prison Hydebank Wood
- Interactive map of His Majesty's Prison Hydebank Wood
- Location: Belfast, Northern Ireland
- Status: Fully operational
- Security class: Medium
- Capacity: 306 single cell accommodation inc. YOC
- Managed by: Northern Ireland Prison Service

HM Prison Hydebank Wood, also known as Hydebank Wood College and Women's Prison, is a women's prison and young offender's centre located in South Belfast.

== Young male offenders ==
A young offenders centre (YOC) holding young male prisoners is located on the same site. The YOC houses young males between 18 and 24 years of age, and the site has also been used at times to hold immigration detainees. The institution put a great deal of effort into improving the diet of young offenders and this transformed many of them for the better.
