= Criminal Justice Inspection Northern Ireland =

Public body in Northern Ireland

Agency overview
- Formed: 2003
- Jurisdiction: Northern Ireland
- Headquarters: Stormont Estate, Belfast
- Employees: 11 (2024/25)
- Agency executive: James Corrigan, Acting Chief Inspector of Criminal Justice in Northern Ireland
- Website: www.cjini.org

Criminal Justice Inspection Northern Ireland (CJI NI) is an independent statutory inspectorate in Northern Ireland. Created in 2003, it is tasked with inspecting all aspects of the criminal justice system in Northern Ireland, apart from the judiciary. The agency is headed by the Chief Inspector of Criminal Justice in Northern Ireland, an office currently held in an acting capacity by James Corrigan. It currently has 11 employees, 6 of whom are inspectors. As an independent inspectorate, the CJI NI reports directly to the Northern Ireland Assembly. The Minister of Justice must grant permission before inspection reports can be published, but they may not alter the content of reports unless it would compromise public interest or safety.

== Reports ==
In June 2018, CJI published a report about the Woodlands Juvenile Justice Centre, a youth detention centre in Bangor, County Down, praising its quality as the "jewel in the crown" of the criminal justice system and describing it as an "envy" for similar institutions in England and Wales.

In October 2025, CJI inspectors recommended a fundamental review of policing at Belfast International Airport, currently handled by Belfast International Airport Constabulary, citing concerns over a lack of experienced leadership. Inspectors also examined the performance of Belfast Harbour Police, who have jurisdiction over Belfast City Airport. They advised that a fundamental overhaul of policing at both airports should be led by the Police Service of Northern Ireland in cooperation with the two former agencies.

== See also ==
- Law enforcement in the United Kingdom
- Police Service of Northern Ireland (PSNI)
- Northern Ireland Prison Service
