= List of acts of the Northern Ireland Assembly from 2010 =

This is a list of acts of the Northern Ireland Assembly passed in 2010. Acts of the Northern Ireland Assembly are enacted by the Northern Ireland Assembly, which has legislative authority over devolved matters in relation to Northern Ireland under the authority of the Northern Ireland Act 1998. Acts are cited by calendar year, in the same fashion as acts of Parliament of the United Kingdom. Each act passed in a respective year is given a chapter number (abbreviated "c.") denoted by Arabic numerals, and citations are usually followed by the suffix "(N.I.)" so as to prevent confusion with acts of Parliament of the United Kingdom.

16 acts of the Northern Ireland Assembly were passed in 2010.

indicates that an act has been transcribed on Wikisource, indicates that an act is available to view at legislation.gov.uk, and indicates the location of the original act in the Parliamentary Archives.

== Acts of the Northern Ireland Assembly ==
Short title	Citation	Royal assent
Long title
Diseases of Animals Act (Northern Ireland) 2010	2010 c. 1 (N.I.)	22 January 2010
An Act to amend the Diseases of Animals (Northern Ireland) Order 1981, (Note: Diseases of Animals (Northern Ireland) Order 1981 (SI 1981/1115)) including provision for preventing the spread of disease; and for connected purposes.
Goods Vehicles (Licensing of Operators) Act (Northern Ireland) 2010	2010 c. 2 (N.I.)	22 January 2010
An Act to make provision concerning the licensing of operators of certain goods vehicles.
Department of Justice Act (Northern Ireland) 2010	2010 c. 3 (N.I.)	12 February 2010
An Act to provide for the establishment of the Department of Justice and for the appointment of the Minister to be in charge of that Department.
Pensions Regulator Tribunal (Transfer of Functions) Act (Northern Ireland) 2010	2010 c. 4 (N.I.)	12 February 2010
An Act to transfer the functions of the Pensions Regulator Tribunal; and for connected purposes.
Water and Sewerage Services (Amendment) Act (Northern Ireland) 2010	2010 c. 5 (N.I.)	12 March 2010
An Act to enable the Department for Regional Development to continue to make payments to water and sewerage undertakers for a limited period.
Budget Act (Northern Ireland) 2010 (repealed)	2010 c. 6 (N.I.)	12 March 2010
An Act to authorise the issue out of the Consolidated Fund of certain sums for the service of the years ending 31st March 2010 and 2011; to appropriate those sums for specified purposes; to authorise the Department of Finance and Personnel to borrow on the credit of the appropriated sums; to authorise the use for the public service of certain resources for the years ending 31st March 2010 and 2011; and to revise the limits on the use of certain accruing resources in the year ending 31st March 2010. (Repealed by Budget (No. 2) Act (Northern Ireland) 2013 (c. 9 (N.I.)))
Local Government (Miscellaneous Provisions) Act (Northern Ireland) 2010	2010 c. 7 (N.I.)	26 March 2010
An Act to make provision about the powers of district councils to enter into contracts and to acquire land otherwise than by agreement; to make provision in connection with the reorganisation of local government, including provision for controls on existing councils, for statutory transition committees and for the payment of severance allowances to councillors; to make provision in relation to the exercise of waste management functions of district councils; and for connected purposes.
Budget (No. 2) Act (Northern Ireland) 2010 (repealed)	2010 c. 8 (N.I.)	26 March 2010
An Act to authorise the issue out of the Consolidated Fund of certain sums for the service of the year ending 31st March 2011; to appropriate those sums for specified purposes; to authorise the use for the public service of certain resources for the year ending 31st March 2011. (Repealed by Budget (No. 2) Act (Northern Ireland) 2013 (c. 9 (N.I.)))
Housing (Amendment) Act (Northern Ireland) 2010	2010 c. 9 (N.I.)	13 April 2010
An Act to amend the law relating to housing.
Forestry Act (Northern Ireland) 2010	2010 c. 10 (N.I.)	28 June 2010
An Act to make provision in relation to forestry and connected matters.
Budget (No. 3) Act (Northern Ireland) 2010 (repealed)	2010 c. 11 (N.I.)	28 June 2010
An Act to authorise the issue out of the Consolidated Fund of certain sums for the service of the year ending 31st March 2011; to appropriate those sums for specified purposes; to authorise the Department of Finance and Personnel to borrow on the credit of the appropriated sums; to authorise the use for the public service of certain resources (including accruing resources) for the year ending 31st March 2011; to authorise the issue out of the Consolidated Fund of excess cash sums for the service of the year ending 31st March 2009; and to repeal certain spent provisions. (Repealed by Budget (No. 2) Act (Northern Ireland) 2013 (c. 9 (N.I.)))
Employment Act (Northern Ireland) 2010	2010 c. 12 (N.I.)	2 August 2010
An Act to make provision about the enforcement of legislation relating to employment agencies and the minimum wage; to make provision about the membership of, and representation before, the Industrial Court; to provide for compensation for financial loss in cases of unlawful underpayment or non-payment; and for connected purposes.
Welfare Reform Act (Northern Ireland) 2010	2010 c. 13 (N.I.)	13 August 2010
An Act to amend the law relating to social security; to amend the law relating to child support; and for connected purposes.
Roads (Miscellaneous Provisions) Act (Northern Ireland) 2010	2010 c. 14 (N.I.)	13 August 2010
An Act to provide for permit schemes to control the carrying out of works in roads; for prohibiting or restricting the use of roads in connection with special events; for inquiries in connection with the exercise of certain functions relating to roads; and for connected purposes.
Unsolicited Services (Trade and Business Directories) Act (Northern Ireland) 2010	2010 c. 15 (N.I.)	15 December 2010
An Act to make provision about charges for entries in trade or business directories.
Debt Relief Act (Northern Ireland) 2010	2010 c. 16 (N.I.)	15 December 2010
An Act to make provision about the relief of debt of individuals and for connected purposes.
