= Chris Ryder (journalist) =

Northern Ireland journalist (1947–2020)

- Born: Newry, Ireland
- Died: October 2, 2020 (aged 73)
- Occupations: Journalist; author
- Known for: Investigative reporting

Christopher Edward Ryder (9 May 1947 – 2 October 2020) was a journalist and author from Northern Ireland.

Chris Ryder was born in Newry in 1947. He attended St. Mary's Christian Brothers' Grammar School, Belfast.

He worked as a journalist for several newspapers including the Belfast Telegraph, the Sunday Times and the Daily Telegraph. He was targeted for murder by the IRA as a result of his reports on the group's racketeering in the Sunday Times.

Between 1994 and 1997 he was a member of the Police Authority for Northern Ireland. In 2011 he brought a case against the Policing Board to the Fair Employment Tribunal for its failure to interview him for membership of the board. The board settled out of court.

He wrote books on the Royal Ulster Constabulary, the Ulster Defence Regiment and the Northern Ireland Prison Services.

He died in Belfast in 2020.

== Bibliography ==
- Ryder, C. (1989). The RUC: A Force Under Fire. London: Methuen.
- Ryder, C. (1991). The Ulster Defence Regiment: An instrument of peace. London: Methuen.
- Ryder, C. (2001). Drumcree: The Orange Order's Last Stand. London: Methuen.
- Ryder, C. (2004). The Fateful Split: Catholics and The Royal Ulster Constabulary. London: Methuen.
