= Stop the Spread =

Irish public health campaign

Stop the Spread was a multi-media public health awareness campaign by Safefood aimed at tackling public misconception regarding overweightness and obesity in adults on the island of Ireland. The campaign was officially launched on 10 May 2011 at the Royal College of Physicians by Minister of State at the Department of Health and Children with responsibility for primary care, Róisín Shortall T.D.

== Campaign message ==
A key message of the campaign was communicating new information to the public on waist sizes for men and women, and how to measure these correctly. These waist measurements are 32 inches for women and 37 inches for men based on guidelines from the World Health Organization (WHO) for a healthy waist size.

The campaign used both online and offline media including, TV and radio and outdoor advertising and public relations encouraging members of the public to pick up a free measuring tape from participating pharmacies and check their waist measurements. Stop the Spread represented the first integrated use of social and digital media by Safefood in a public health awareness campaign.

To raise further awareness of the campaign with the public, an 8-week weight management programme with MLA's in the Northern Ireland Assembly was carried out. In total, 32 MLAs participated including the Chair and Deputy Chair of the Health Committee.

== Post-campaign evaluation ==
Safefood's post campaign research demonstrated that it had successfully achieved its objectives.

- Increase in public awareness of the issue of overweightness and obesity with a 5% increase among adults on the island of Ireland who now consider themselves to be overweight.
- There was also an increased recognition of the scale of the problem which had shifted from 30% (benchmark) to 50% in December 2011 with 1 in 5 claiming to have measured their waist during the campaign.
- 40% reporting that the campaign had motivated them to start losing weight.
- Support of the campaign was secured from over 75% of pharmacies from across the island of Ireland.
- Over 400,000 free measuring tapes were distributed.
