= Northern Ireland Prison Service =

Government service managing prisons within Northern Ireland

Executive Agency overview
- Formed: 1 December 1921
- Jurisdiction: Northern Ireland, United Kingdom
- Headquarters: Castle Buildings, Stormont Estate, Belfast
- Employees: 1,554
- Minister responsible: Naomi Long MLA, Minister of Justice
- Executive Agency executive: Beverley Wall, Director General
- Parent department: Department of Justice
- Website: Official Website

Map
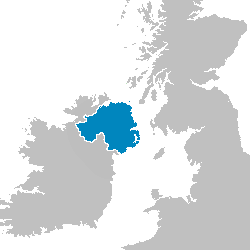
- Northern Ireland Prison Service's jurisdiction

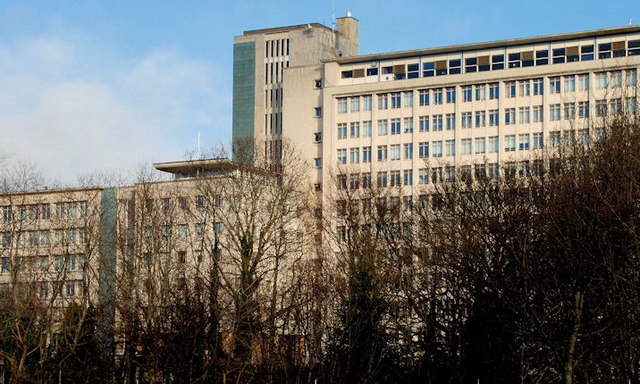
Dundonald House is the former headquarters for the Prison Service

The Northern Ireland Prison Service is the agency charged with managing prisons in Northern Ireland.

It is an executive agency of the Department of Justice, the headquarters of which are in Castle Buildings in the Stormont Estate in Belfast.

The service's stated aim is "to improve public safety by reducing the risk of re-offending through the management and rehabilitation of offenders in custody".

It is distinct from His Majesty's Prison Service, which manages most prisons in England and Wales, and the Scottish Prison Service, which manages most prisons in Scotland.

== Background ==
The Prison Service is responsible for providing prison services in Northern Ireland. Its main statutory duties are set out in the Prison Act (Northern Ireland) 1953 (c. 18 (N.I.)) and rules made under the act.

Prior to partition, prisons in Ireland were administered by the Prison Board of Ireland. After the Government of Ireland Act 1920, control of prisons in Northern Ireland was formally handed over from the Prison Board of Ireland on 1 December 1921 to the newly created Northern Ireland Prison Service. The service was administered by the Ministry of Home Affairs, before being established as a government agency of the Northern Ireland Office on 1 April 1995, and later the Department of Justice following the devolution of justice powers on 12 April 2010.

The Prison Service is a major component of the wider criminal justice system and contributes to achieving the system's overall aims and objectives. As the responsible minister, Minister of Justice accounts to Northern Ireland Assembly for the Prison Service and shares Ministerial responsibility and accountability for the criminal justice system as a whole with the Attorney General. The office of Minister of Justice has been vacant since the collapse of the Northern Ireland Executive on 3 February 2022.

As of March 2023, the Northern Ireland Prison Service employed 1,554 staff.

== Establishments ==
The Prison Service currently has three operational establishments:

=== HM Prison Maghaberry ===
A modern Category A prison housing adult male long-term sentenced and remand prisoners. Various units in the establishment also accommodate Category B and C prisoners.

The prison also houses a working-out unit, where prisoners can leave the prison for short periods under direct supervision, and Burren House, a detachment of Maghaberry on Crumlin Road, Belfast, serves as a Category D unit.

In accordance with the recommendations of the 2003 Steele Review, Maghaberry also runs a separated regime for paramilitary prisoners, with two wings specially adapted to house Loyalist and Republican prisoners.

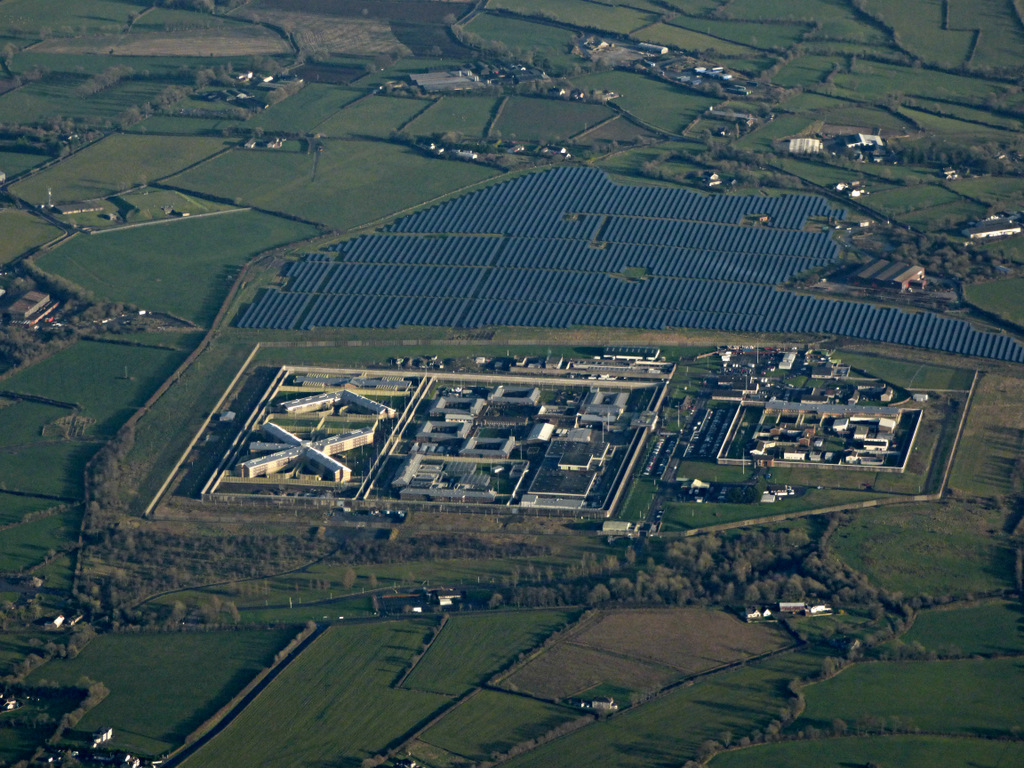
Maghaberry is the service's primary establishment and Northern Ireland's largest prison

=== HM Prison Magilligan ===
A medium-security prison housing shorter-term adult male prisoners which also has low-security accommodation for selected prisoners nearing the end of their sentences;

=== Hydebank Wood College and Women's Prison ===
Officially HM Prison Hydebank Wood, this is a medium-to-low-security establishment accommodating male young offenders and all female prisoners (including female immigration detainees).

The service's primary Prison Officer training facility, the Prison Service College, is based at Hydebank Wood.

== Former Establishments ==
=== HM Prison Armagh ===
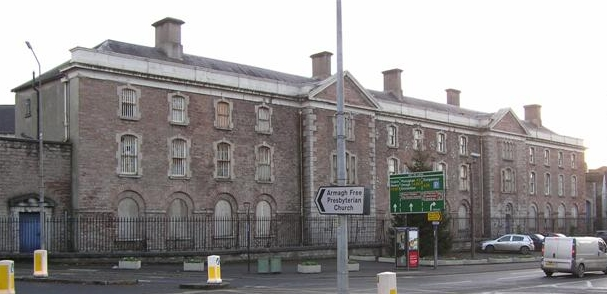
Armagh Prison

Also known as Armagh Gaol, this establishment dates back to 1780, where it served as the primary women's prison in Northern Ireland for most of its life, although it held male prisoners at various points.

The prison closed in 1986 and the female prisoners were moved to the newly built Maghaberry Prison.

=== HM Prison Belfast ===
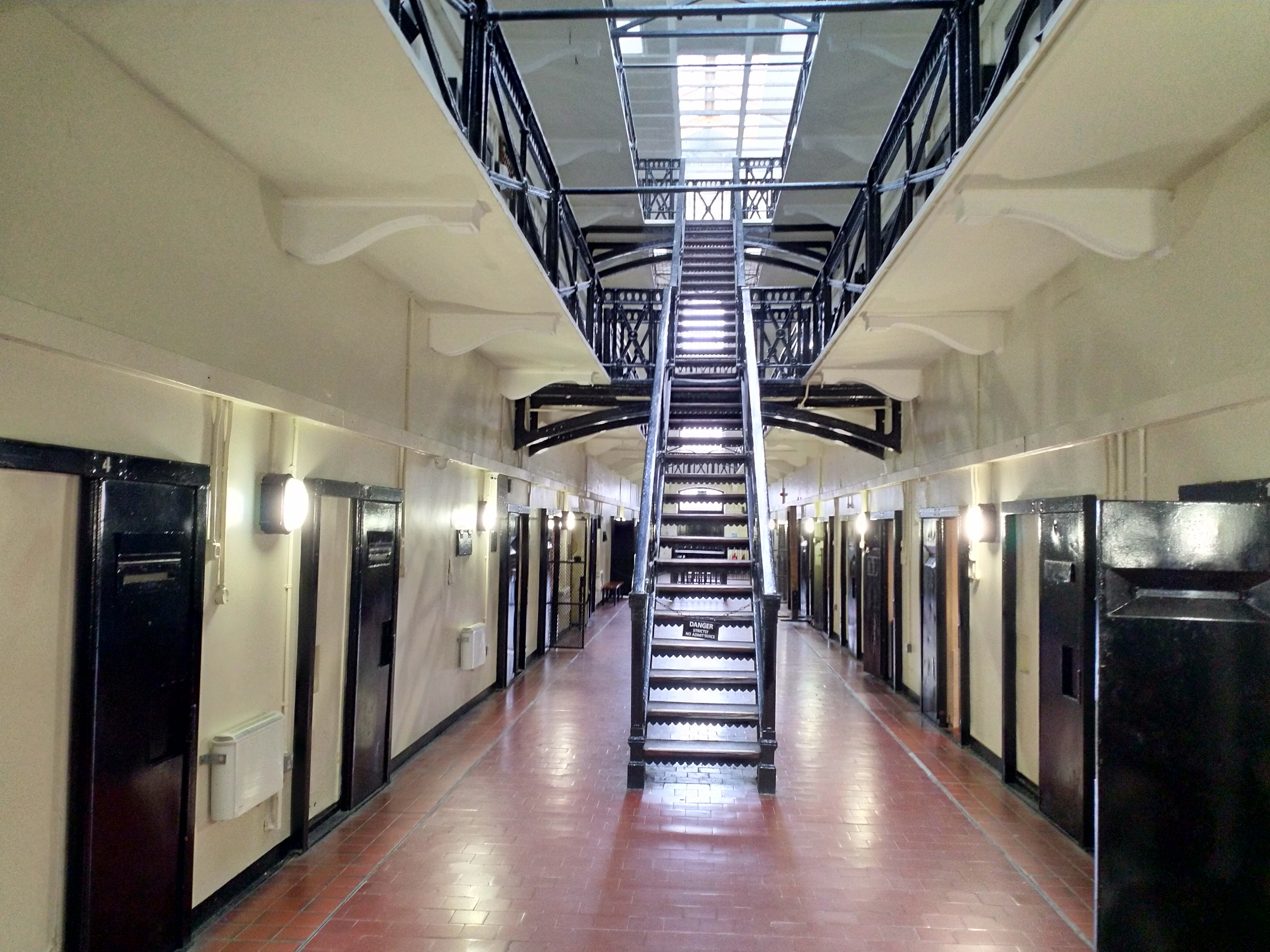
Inside HMP Belfast, also known as the Crumlin Road Gaol

Also known as Crumlin Road Gaol, this establishment opened in 1846 to replace the County Gaol for Antrim in Carrickfergus.

The prison housed all categories of prisoners, many of which were imprisoned for Troubles-related crimes, and saw seventeen executions during its life.

The prison closed in 1996 and the majority of prisoners were transferred to Maghaberry Prison.

It now has a reputation for being a very paranormally-active location and the gaol runs its own guided ghost walks and paranormal investigations.

=== HM Prison Maze ===
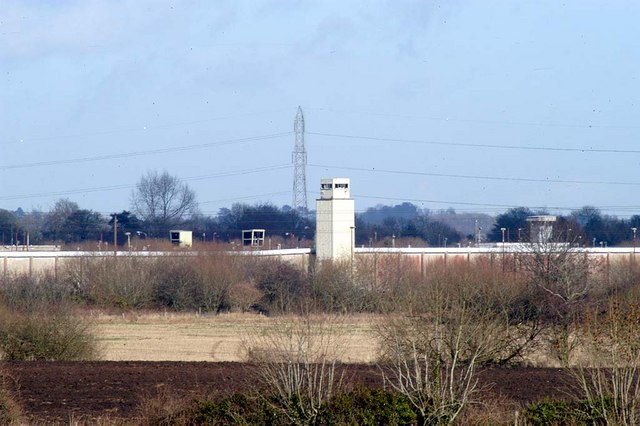
One of the surviving watch-towers at the Maze Prison

This establishment began as Long Kesh Detention Centre in 1971, before being expanded with the building of the "H-blocks" in 1976 to become known as the Maze Prison.

The most well-known prison during the Troubles, this establishment housed paramilitary prisoners from its formation, and was the scene of several infamous events such as the 1981 Hunger Strike and the Maze Prison escape of 1983.

The prison was closed in 2000 and prisoners transferred to HMP Maghaberry. Demolition of most of the site began in 2006, but much of the western part of the estate remains, including the hospital block and H-block 6, which are listed structures. Plans to build a peace centre at the site broke down in 2019 when the European Union withdrew funding due to disagreements between the political parties. Unionist parties feared that the site could become a shrine to IRA members such as Bobby Sands, who died in the hospital block while on hunger strike.

The site is now home to a number of organisations, such as the Ulster Aviation society, and the Balmoral Show.

== Terror threat ==
Much like officers of the Police Service of Northern Ireland, prison officers in Northern Ireland remain under a severe level of threat from dissident Republican terrorist groups, and - to a lesser extent - Loyalist paramilitary terrorist groups.

Over thirty prison officers have been murdered in the line of duty in Northern Ireland, the vast majority by paramilitary terrorist groups. The most recent murders were that of David Black, shot dead on his way to work in 2012, and Adrian Ismay, who died in hospital eleven days after an IED detonated under his vehicle in 2016.

Due to the ongoing threat, officers must inspect their vehicles each morning for IEDs, limit activities which may personally identify them, and be discreet about the display of uniform and other items which could identify them as prison officers. Officers may also avail of a personal protection weapon (PPW), although unlike their Police counterparts this is not mandatory.

== Prison Officers ==
=== Uniform ===
Prison officers in Northern Ireland wear a dark blue uniform (in contrast to the black uniform worn in England & Wales). The formal uniform consists of a white shirt, dark blue tie, dark blue tunic and trousers (for males) or skirt (for females), black shoes or boots, black gloves and a dark blue peaked cap for males and Kepi-style cap for females. Medals and a whistle on a chain are worn on the tunics. For everyday use, the tunic is replaced with a fleece or NATO-style pullover. Tunics are no longer issued to new recruits and skirts are no longer issued to new female recruits, but both may still be used for some ceremonial duties.

Prison officers in Hydebank do not wear a prison service uniform, but adopt instead a professional smart-casual dress code.

In contrast to the Police Service of Northern Ireland, the Northern Ireland Prison Service maintains the Royal cypher on its cap badge, and the acronym "HMP" on its epaulettes.

=== Powers and structure ===
Prison officers (historically known as "warders"), under the Prison Act (Northern Ireland) 1953, have "all the powers, authority, protection and privileges of a constable" whilst acting as such.

Prison Officers may carry weapons and use reasonable force (as sworn constables) to protect people. They carry expandable batons.

Most prison officers work in teams or shifts, with a single unit (normally referred to as a House) overseen by a Senior Officer, and usually with three or four staff to a wing. Larger units such as Davis House may have three or four Senior Officers in command, and dozens of officers on the wings.

The overall manager of a unit or house is the Unit Manager, a junior Governor grade, who has overall responsibility for their house and line management of the house Senior Officer.

=== Equipment ===
Prison officers working on landings will carry:

- A 21" Monadnock friction-lock baton, for self-defence
- An internal radio, for communication between officers and the house control room
- Home Office prison keys, held on a long chain or ballistic coiled lanyard
- Body Worn Video, a camera worn on the chest
- A Hoffman cut down tool, to cut ligatures, held in a sealed belt pouch
- Hiatt speedcuffs are carried by some specialist officers, such as the Designated Search Team, as well as Prisoner Escorting and Court Custody Service (PECCS) officers.

=== Rank structure ===
Prior to 2012 the rank structure of the Northern Ireland Prison Service was similar to that of England and Wales pre-2000. The primary contingent comprised Main Grade Officers and Operation Support grades, subordinate to Principal Officers (rank badge – two Bath stars) and Senior Officers (rank badge – single Bath star).

The Principal Officer grade was phased out between 2002 and 2008, and a new Senior Officer grade created in 2008 to streamline both roles. The custody Prison Officer grade was created in 2012 to replace Main Grades and Operation Support, although some longer-service staff remain in the older grades. The Unit Manager grade was created in 2014 as a junior Governor grade.

The prison service currently has only two uniformed grades.

Operational prison grades in descending order of rank are as follows:

- Governor in Charge
- Deputy Governor in Charge
- Functional Head
- Unit Manager
- Senior Officer
- Officers, including:
  - Night Custody Officer
  - Custody Prison Officer
- Discontinued Officer grades - some longer-term officers remain in these grades:
  - Main Grade Officer
  - Operational Support Grade

==== PECCS ====
The Prisoner Escorting and Court Custody Service (PECCS), a subdivision of the prison service, maintains its own rank structure, which are as follows in descending rank order:

- PECCS Manager
- Prisoner Custody Officer

Previous ranks within PECCS include Youth Supervision Officer, this rank was negated in 2018

== Rank insignia ==
Rank insignia pre-1989
Rank	Prison officer grades (Note: Includes the older main grade officer grade, the newer custody prison officer grade (created in 2012), and the night custody officer grade, all of which hold the same level of authority in the rank structure.)	Senior officer	Principal officer	Chief officer II	Chief officer I	Governor 1-5
Insignia						Non-Uniformed
Rank insignia 1989-2014
Rank	Prison officer grades	Senior officer	Principal officer	Governor 2-5	Governor 1	
Insignia				Non-uniformed	Non-uniformed	
Current rank insignia 2014-present
Rank	Prison officer grades	Senior officer	Unit manager	Head of function	Deputy governor	Governor in charge
Insignia			Non-uniformed	Non-uniformed	Non-uniformed	Non-uniformed

== Officers killed in the line of duty ==
Date	Rank/Title	Name	Age	Establishment	By	Description
6 February 1942	Prison Officer	Robert Walker	33	Belfast	Original IRA	The first officer to be killed by terrorists, Robert was shot by a gunman as he returned to Belfast Prison after being home for lunch. No one was ever charged with his murder but it is generally recognised that the IRA were involved in his death.
23 September 1974	Senior Officer (Retired)	William McCully	58		Provisional IRA	William was shot by two gunmen at his home at Hillmount Gardens, Belfast. His wife was injured in the attack. William had served for 23 years as a PTI and later as a Hospital Officer. Having retired in 1971 he had been working as a school caretaker at Friends' School, Lisburn.
8 April 1976	Prison Officer	Patrick Dillon	36	HMP Magilligan	IRA	Patrick was shot when getting into his car outside his home at Loughmacrory Park, Omagh. Targeted as part of the IRA campaign related to a government decision to phase out Special Category Status.
19 April 1976	Clerical Officer III	John Delmer Cummings	55	HMP Belfast	IRA	John was shot by IRA gunmen when he answered a knock on the front door of his home in Seymour Hill, Dunmurry, South Belfast.
8 October 1976	Prison Officer	Robert John Hamilton	29	HMP Magilligan	IRA	Robert was shot by three IRA gunmen outside his home at Grosvenor Road, Londonderry. He was hit six times in the chest and was dead on arrival at hospital.
22 June 1977	Principal Officer	John Wesley Milliken	53	HMP Belfast	IRA	Shot by IRA gunmen while walking along Clifton Park Avenue on his way home after completing duty at Belfast Prison. John was shot in the head and chest at close range and died an hour later in hospital.
22 July 1977	Prison Officer	Thomas Graham Fenton	20	HMP Magilligan	IRA	Thomas was shot by the IRA as he drank in Molloy's Bar, Ballymoney. One gunman blocked the door while a second opened fire with a rifle, hitting Thomas four times. His companion was hit twice but survived the incident.
7 October 1977	Principal Officer	Desmond Ernest Irvine	40	HMP Maze	IRA	Desmond was killed by IRA gunmen after attending a Prison Officers' Association conference in the Wellington Park Hotel, Belfast. Two weeks before his death he had taken part in a Thames Television documentary on life in the Maze Prison. He had agreed to be identified in the programme, which was very unusual at the time.
26 November 1978	Governor II	Albert Miles	50	HMP Maze	IRA	Shot by an IRA gunman after they broke down the door of his home at Cavehill Road, Belfast. Governor Miles had responsibility for several H-Blocks where Republican prisoners were staging a protest about prison conditions at the time.
14 December 1978	Prison Officer	John Murdie McTier	33	HMP Belfast	IRA	John was shot in a 'drive-by' shooting as he left Belfast Prison in his car on completion of his shift. Two other officers were also in the vehicle. One was wounded and the other was unharmed. The IRA claimed responsibility for the attack.
3 February 1979	Principal Officer (retired)	Patrick Mackin	60	Prison Service College	IRA	The retired Principal Officer and his wife Violet were shot dead in their Oldpark Road home around 7pm. Their bodies were not discovered until the following day by their son. Patrick was found slumped in a chair and Violet was lying on the floor. In a statement, the IRA claimed Violet Mackin was not the target but had been killed as she struggled with the gunmen.
16 April 1979	Prison Officer	Michael Christopher Cassidy	31	HMP Belfast	IRA	Michael was shot by IRA gunmen as he attended a wedding at St. MacCartan's Church, Clogher. He was holding the hand of his three-year-old daughter as they left the church with the wedding party. He was shot several times as he lay on the ground. Michael was a native of Aughnacloy who was living in north Belfast. In a separate attack, shots had been fired into his Belfast home several weeks earlier.
19 April 1979	Prison Officer	Agnes Jean Wallace	40	HMP Armagh	IRA	The first female officer to be killed during the Troubles, Agnes was shot by the IRA in a gun and grenade attack on prison staff a few yards from the gates of Armagh Prison. Three fellow officers were injured and survived the attack, but Agnes died at the scene. She had been in the service for three months.
14 September 1979	Prison Officer	George Foster	30	HMP Belfast	IRA	George died after he and a colleague were shot by IRA gunmen leaving the Buff's Club which was located in a side street of Crumlin Road. The two men regularly took lunch in the club and were returning to the prison. The second officer survived the attack.
19 September 1979	Assistant Governor	Edward Donald Jones BEM ISO	60	HMP Belfast	IRA	Edward was the Assistant Governor at Belfast Prison and was shot in his car while waiting for traffic lights to change on the Crumlin Road a short distance from the prison. A car drew up beside him and an IRA gunman opened fire. Governor Jones was hit in the head. A colleague travelling with him was uninjured.
5 November 1979	Prison Officer	Thomas Gilhooley	25	HMP Belfast	IRA	Thomas was shot by an IRA gunman as he left Belfast Prison in his car. The gunman fired one shot and as Thomas slumped over the wheel, the gunman closed in and fired several more shots into Tomas as he lay helpless. Another Prison Officer who was also leaving the prison fired several shots at the gunman, but he escaped in a waiting car.
7 November 1979	Clerical Officer III	David W. Teeney	20	HMP Belfast	IRA	David was shot by an IRA gunman as he waited for a bus at Clifton Street. He died an hour later in the Mater Hospital. David had been married for just three months.
23 November 1979	Prison Officer	Gerald Francis Melville	45	HMP Maze	IRA	Gerald was shot by the IRA in his home at Hightown Road, Glengormley. His body was not found until the following morning. His front door had not been forced and it appears that he opened the door for the gunmen after speaking to them on the intercom.
3 December 1979	Chief Officer I	William Wright BEM	58	HMP Belfast	IRA	William was shot six times in the back as he arrived home after completion of his duty shift. There had been a previous attempt on his life two years earlier in which he had narrowly avoided death. He had been awarded the British Empire Medal and had served for 34 years.
17 December 1979	Senior Officer	William Wilson	58	HMP Belfast	IRA	William was shot by an IRA gunman as he entered a social club which he regularly attended at lunchtime. The gunman had followed William from the prison and shot him in the back on the steps of the club. William had served 31 years in the service.
18 January 1980	Prison Officer	Graham Francis Cox	35	HMP Magilligan	IRA	Graham was shot by the IRA while driving home after his shift at Magilligan Prison. His vehicle lost control and crashed down a slope at Stradreagh, outside Londonderry. The car was not discovered until the following morning.
30 December 1980	Prison Officer	William Cecil Burns	45	HMP Belfast	UVF	William was shot by the UVF as he left home for work. His death was claimed to be in retaliation for "maltreatment of loyalist prisoners" during a prisoner dispute with prison staff.
7 October 1982	Prison Officer	Elizabeth Matilda Chambers	28	HMP Armagh	IRA	Elizabeth was driving her car to work at Armagh Prison when she was involved in an IRA ambush on a UDR soldier. The soldiers car lost control and hit Elizabeth's car. Both Elizabeth and the soldier were killed.
25 September 1983	Prison Officer	James Andrew Ferris	43	HMP Maze	Prisoner	James died during the mass escape from the Maze Prison. He suffered a heart attack after being stabbed with a prison workshop chisel. 16 prisoners were charged with his murder but all were acquitted. The judge stated that although the officer had acted courageously, he could not be satisfied that the heart attack was the result of being stabbed.
6 March 1984	Governor III	William McConnell B.A.	35	HMP Maze	IRA	William was shot by IRA gunmen in the driveway of his home as he checked his car for underside booby-traps. His wife and child witnessed the attack. One of his neighbours was implicated in the murder as he had provided details of William's movements, gave the killers a base of operations in his home, and disposed of the weapons after the attack. He was jailed for life for his part in the killing.
17 February 1985	Principal Officer	Patrick Thomas Kerr BEM	37	HMP Maze	IRA	Patrick was shot by IRA gunmen who were waiting for him as he left St. Patrick's Cathedral after attending mass. Two of his children witnessed the attack. Patrick died at the scene. He had previously been awarded the British Empire Medal for his distinguished service and exemplary conduct.
23 March 1987	Chief Instructor (Civilian)	Leslie Jarvis	62	HMP Magilligan	IRA	Leslie, who was a civilian instructor at Magilligan Prison, was shot dead by IRA gunmen as he sat in his car outside Magee College in Londonderry. A short time later as two Police Officers were examining his car, a bomb exploded killing them both. This is believed to have been an intentional trap laid by the IRA.
4 October 1988	Prison Officer	Brian Samuel Armour	48	HMP Maze	IRA	Brian was Vice-Chairman of the Prison Officer's Association. He was killed when a booby-trap bomb exploded under his car as he drive through Belfast. In 1990, a former Principal Officer John Hanna was jailed for life for aiding and abetting the killing and conspiring to kill other colleagues. Hanna had been working with the IRA. He later died in prison from cancer.
4 May 1989	Hospital Officer	John Griffiths	37	HMP Maze	IRA	John was killed when a booby-trap device exploded under his car. He had just left home for work. The resulting fire totally consumed the car. The aftermath was witnessed by his wife and children who were unable to help due to the intense heat from the fire.
1 September 1993	Prison Officer	James Alexander Peacock	44	HMP Belfast	UVF	Jim was in his kitchen when UVF gunmen used a sledgehammer to smash their way into his home. They shot him in the back and he died later in hospital. The UVF stated that his death was in retaliation for a dispute at the Maze Prison which had not been resolved to the satisfaction of the loyalist prisoners.
1 November 2012	Prison Officer	David Edmund Black	52	HMP Maghaberry	IRA	David was shot by IRA gunmen as he drove along the M1 on his way to work in Maghaberry Prison. A car drove alongside him and gunmen fired several shots into his vehicle, which then crashed out of control.
15 March 2016	Senior Officer	Adrian Thompson Ismay	52	Prison Service College	IRA	Adrian was a tutor at the Prison Service College and a Control & Restraint instructor. He was injured by a booby-trap bomb which exploded under his vehicle as he drove to work on 4th March 2016. He died 11 days later.

== See also ==
- Northern Ireland Department Of Justice
- Attorney General for Northern Ireland
- Advocate General for Northern Ireland
- Northern Ireland Executive
- Northern Ireland Assembly
- Police Service Northern Ireland
- His Majesty's Prison Service
- Scottish Prison Service
- His Majesty's Inspectorate of Prisons
- HM Prison
- United Kingdom prison population
- List of United Kingdom prisons
- Prison categories in the United Kingdom
- Young offender
- OASys
- Prisons in the Republic of Ireland
- Woodlands Juvenile Justice Centre, the only young offenders' institution in NI; not run by NIPS
