= British–Irish Intergovernmental Conference =

Organization to promote co-operation between British and Irish governments

- Abbreviation: BIIGC
- Predecessor: Anglo-Irish Intergovernmental Conference
- Formation: 17 December 1999; 26 years ago
- Type: IGO
- Legal status: British–Irish Agreement
- Headquarters: Belfast, Northern Ireland^{1}
- Coordinates: 54°35′42″N 5°55′53″W
- Region served: United Kingdom and Ireland
- Members: Ireland; United Kingdom
- Remarks: ^{1} This is the location of the Joint Secretariat of the British–Irish Intergovernmental Conference.

The British–Irish Intergovernmental Conference (BIIGC) is an intergovernmental organisation established by the Governments of Ireland and the United Kingdom under the Good Friday Agreement in 1998. It first met in London in 1999, and the latest meeting took place at 100 Parliament Street in London on 29 April 2024.

When the Northern Ireland Assembly is suspended, devolved matters revert to the BIIGC's remit. The BIIGC guarantees the Government of Ireland a say in areas of bilateral co-operation and on those matters not yet devolved to the Northern Ireland Assembly or the North/South Ministerial Council.

The BIIGC is normally chaired by the Irish Minister for Foreign Affairs and the Secretary of State for Northern Ireland. Provision is made however for meetings at summit level, i.e. between the Taoiseach and Prime Minister, as required. Summit meetings of the BIIGC took place in 1999, 2005 and 2018. There is also provision under the Belfast Agreement for Members of the Legislative Assembly to be involved in the intergovernmental conference but they do not have the power to block decisions taken by the two governments.

== History ==
The establishment of the BIIGC was provided for under Strand Three of the Good Friday Agreement, signed on 8 March 1998. The inaugural meeting took place at 10 Downing Street on 17 December 1999 and was chaired by Prime Minister Tony Blair and Taoiseach Bertie Ahern and attended by representatives of the Irish government, the British government and the Northern Ireland Executive.

The BIIGC replaced the Anglo-Irish Conference which was established under Article 2 of the Anglo-Irish Agreement of 1985. Under the terms of the Belfast Agreement, the BIIGC is supported by officials of the British and Irish Governments, including a standing Joint Secretariat of officials dealing with non-devolved Northern Ireland matters. The BIIGC secretariat has approximately 21 staff (10 for the British side, 11 for the Irish side). The staff comprise a mix of grades from senior civil servants to administrative support grades.

== Devolved matters ==
In respect of bilateral co-operation these include:

- Asylum and immigration, including Common Travel Area issues
- European Union and international issues
- Social security including methods of fraud detection
- Education
- Policy on misuse of drugs: combating organised crime and associated money laundering
- Fiscal issues

== Non-devolved matters ==
In respect of non-devolved matters issues include:

- Rights
- Policing, including implementation of the Patten Report
- Criminal justice
- Normalisation of security arrangements and practices
- Cross-border security co-operation
- Victims of violence
- Prison issues
- Drugs and drug trafficking
- Broadcasting

== Criminal justice co-operation ==
Under an international agreement between the UK and Ireland on "Co-operation on Criminal Justice Matters" signed in 2005, the Northern Ireland minister responsible for justice reports to the BIIGC on certain matters. This is because the Agreement provides that the Ministers of the governments of the United Kingdom and Ireland (hereinafter referred to as "the Ministers") responsible for criminal justice matters in the two jurisdictions (Ireland and Northern Ireland) shall meet at least annually for the purpose of facilitating more effective co-operation and co-ordination on criminal justice matters, including in combating criminal behaviour, working together in the prevention of crime and on community safety issues, and dealing with offenders after conviction. Such meetings shall be referred to hereinafter as Ministerial Meetings on criminal justice co-operation. The Agreement provides that such meetings shall operate under the auspices of, and be accountable to, the British–Irish Intergovernmental Conference.

== Meetings ==
The following is a list of meetings of the BIIGC:

- 1–17 December 1999 (Summit Level Meeting)
- 2–22 October 2002
- 3–18 December 2002
- 4–20 May 2003
- 5–2 July 2003
- 6–18 September 2003
- 7–22 January 2004
- 8–21 April 2004
- 9–7 July 2004
- 10–15 December 2004
- 11–2 March 2005
- 12–27 June 2005 (Summit Level Meeting)
- 13–19 October 2005
- 14–1 February 2006
- 15–2 May 2006
- 16–25 July 2006
- 17–24 October 2006
- 18–26 February 2007
- 25 July 2018
- 2 November 2018
- 8 May 2019
- 24 June 2021
- 2 December 2021
- 23 March 2022
- 7 October 2022
- 19 January 2023
- 28 November 2023
- 29 April 2024
- 3 December 2024
- 24 April 2025
- 17 November 2025
- 30 April 2026

== See also ==
- British-Irish Council
- North/South Ministerial Council
- Belfast Agreement
- Northern Ireland Executive
- Government of the United Kingdom
- Government of Ireland
