= Woodlands Juvenile Justice Centre =

Youth detention facility in Bangor, Northern Ireland

- Location in Northern Ireland Woodlands Juvenile Justice Centre (County Down)
- Location: Bangor, Northern Ireland
- Status: Operational
- Security class: Juvenile Justice Centre
- Capacity: 48
- Population: ~30
- Opened: 2007
- Managed by: Youth Justice Agency
- Director: Mary Aughey

Woodlands Juvenile Justice Centre (JJC) is a youth detention centre located in Bangor, County Down; it is the only such facility in Northern Ireland.

== History ==
The Criminal Justice (Children) (Northern Ireland) Order 1998 provides legislative basis for the JJC's operation. Woodlands Juvenile Justice Centre opened on the Rathgael site in 2007. It is for children of both sexes aged 10 to 17, held either on remand or having been sentenced by a court to custody.

The centre aims to providing a safe, secure and caring environment, delivers anti-offending programmes, addresses development, health, educational and recreational needs and prepares offenders for return to family and community.

A 2018 report by Criminal Justice Inspection Northern Ireland was very positive about Woodlands, but noted the disproportionate number of Catholic children in the centre.

A new unit was opened in 2024, increasing capacity to 48; the typical population is about 30.
