= Institute of Public Health (all-Ireland) =

The All Island Institute of Public Health is an all-island organisation supporting the development of public health policy in Ireland and Northern Ireland.

It was established in 1999 to provide support on public health policy to the respective Departments of Health in both jurisdictions.

In 2025, the Institute updated its name to the All Island Institute of Public Health (IPH) and launched a new corporate strategy (2026-2030).

== See also ==
- Public Health Agency (Northern Ireland)
- List of hospitals in Northern Ireland
