= Probation Board for Northern Ireland =

Northern Irish public body

The Probation Board for Northern Ireland (PBNI) is a non-departmental public body responsible to the Northern Ireland Department of Justice for the Probation Service in Northern Ireland. It is part of the Public Protection Arrangements Northern Ireland (PPANI). The Board has 13 members drawn from across the community to oversee the work of the Probation Service. It employs around 430 people, around half of whom are probation officers, based in 31 offices throughout Northern Ireland. The Board requires probation officers to hold professional qualifications in social work. Other employees are community service supervisors, probation services officers, and corporate services staff.

The work of the Board involves assessing convicted offenders, preparing pre-sentence reports for the courts, reports for parole commissioners and other justice-related bodies. The Board supervises over 4,000 court orders at any given time. The Board also provides a number of behavioural change programmes such as sex offending, domestic violence, drug/alcohol-related offending, anger management and violence.

== History of probation in Northern Ireland ==
In 1908, the first official probation Officers started work in Belfast, following the implementation of the Probation of Offenders Act 1907. Under this Act, magistrates were able to appoint probation officers to supervise defendants through a probation order for the first time. Some of the first appointed probation officers in Belfast came from Belfast City Mission and St Vincent de Paul. The magistracy had responsibility for probation services.

In 1921, when Northern Ireland came into being, the authority for justice was devolved to the new Northern Ireland Parliament and rested with the Ministry of Home Affairs. It was not until 1928 that the Ministry began issuing probation rules (the first set of standards for the Probation Service). In 1935, following developments in England, the Committee on the Protection and Welfare of the Young and the Treatment of Young Offenders (known as the Lynn Committee) was established. At this time, England and Wales used probation services much more than Northern Ireland.

In 1936, appointing probation officers became the responsibility of the Ministry of Home Affairs and was funded through the Dog Licence Fund. In 1936, the cost of the probation service was £312.

The Lynn Committee published its report in 1938 The report examined a number of issues that were believed to be contributory factors to offending behaviour in young people such as unemployment, inadequate housing, cinemas, dance halls and street trading. Any implementation of recommendations were stalled due to the outbreak of World War Two (1939–1945).

The first senior probation officer (head of probation) was James McAdam in 1946, though during his tenure (1946–1948) his role was more of a co-ordinating and instructor type role.

In 1950, the Northern Ireland Parliament passed the Probation Act (NI) which was influenced by another report endorsing the Lynn Committee Report of 1938. From then, the Ministry of Home Affairs had responsibility for the Probation Service including appointments and funding (staff were now civil servants with salaries and pensions to reflect the change). The legislation also meant that probation officers would now have to enquire into the circumstances of any accused to write a report to aid the court's determining the most suitable sentence. In addition, the Children and Young Persons (NI) Act also made it necessary for probation officers to be notified when young persons came before the courts to prepare a similar report.

The Prison Act 1953 gave probation officers new responsibilities in the after care of sentenced offenders through post release supervision.

The Children and Young Persons (NI) Act 1968 set the age of criminal responsibility at 10 and set out the court's powers in relation to the care and protection of young persons aged 14 and over. This continued the involvement of the Probation Service in the area of young offenders. Also during this time, the Probation Service recruited its first university graduates.

By 1976, there were 45 probation officers with 7 support staff. There were also 23 trainees. This was the beginning of the Probation Service progressing towards a more professional organisation with opportunities to develop skills and experience.

The period of the Troubles in Northern Ireland saw much of the after care aspect of the probation officer's role put on ice as emergency legislation introduced in 1970 brought in to deal with aspects of the unrest made a large number of new prisoners eligible for the after care. This would have put probation officers at the centre supervising a different type of released prisoner not envisaged in the original 1953 Act. As such, the Probation Service did not have to supervise politically motivated offenders.

In 1979, a review group published a report after being formed by the Department of Health and Social Services and the Northern Ireland Office to look at the future of the Probation Service. The group was headed by Sir Harold Black. It recommended that the Probation Service remain as a separate service focusing on dealing with offenders and serving the courts. It also recommended that the Probation Service should be administered by a board drawn from the whole community and that a written code of practice should be drawn up for approval by the courts and the Secretary of State.

In 1982, the Probation Board Order (NI) was enacted establishing the Probation Board for Northern Ireland (PBNI) as a non-departmental public body with a chair, deputy chair and between 10 and 18 other members to be appointed by the Secretary of State for a three-year term. Jim Grew was the first chair.
