= Northern Ireland Medical and Dental Training Agency =

The Northern Ireland Medical and Dental Training Agency (NIMDTA) is an independent, special agency of the Department of Health in Northern Ireland, responsible for the NIMDTA commissions, promotes and oversees postgraduate medical and dental education and training throughout Northern Ireland. NIMDTA is accountable to the GMC for ensuring that the standards set by the GMC are achieved.

On multiple occasions, the agency has reported concerns about training places not being used.
