= The Ulster-Scot =

Northern Irish newspaper

The Ulster-Scot is a free, bi-monthly publication produced by the Ulster-Scots Agency, published in Northern Ireland. It is a product of incentives to encourage awareness of Ulster heritage and often provided as a supplement with local newspaper The News Letter. It was first published in November 2002. The news topics are based around the heritage of Ulster Scots and the Ulster variant of the Scots language. The main content of the paper is written in English with various sections in Ulster-Scots. It reports on Ulster-Scots events such as dances and Burns suppers, as well as releases of traditional music on CD and books about Ulster-Scots language and culture.

The term Ulster-Scots refers to people from Scotland that settled in Ulster, and their descendants. It also refers to their heritage and cultural traditions.

It can be read online at the Ulster Scots Agency website, ulsterscotsagency.com.
