= Northern Ireland Practice and Education Council for Nursing and Midwifery =

The Northern Ireland Practice and Education Council for Nursing and Midwifery (NIPEC) is an independent, special agency of the Department of Health in Northern Ireland, established in 2002 via the Health and Social Care Act. It sets standards of proficiency, standards of practice, and other guidance related to the profession.
