= Hillsborough Castle Agreement =

Northern Irish law concerning devolution

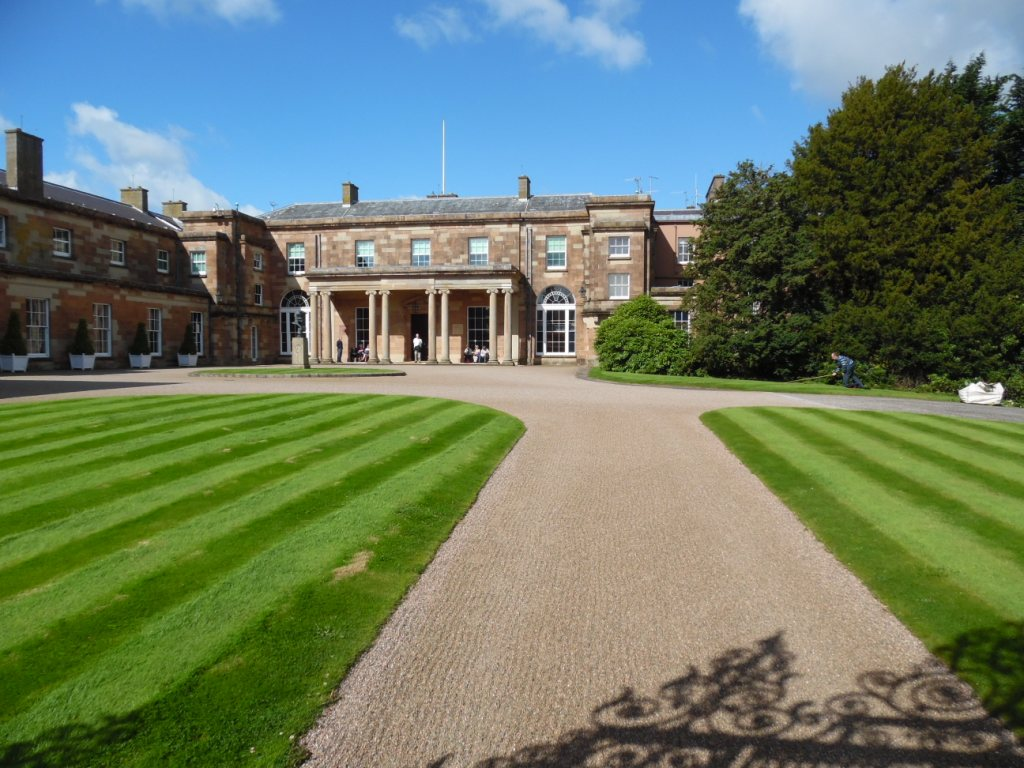
Hillsborough Castle, Co Down

The Hillsborough Agreement was an agreement reached in Northern Ireland that enabled the devolution of policing and justice powers to the Northern Ireland Executive. Concluded on 5 February 2010, it also included an provisions on controversial parades and the implementation of outstanding matters from the St Andrews Agreement. Additionally, it changed the method for selecting the Minister of Justice, providing for appointment with cross-community support rather than through the D'Hondt method used for most other ministers.

The agreement was signed at, and named after, Hillsborough Castle in the village of Royal Hillsborough, County Down. The Sunningdale Agreement, Belfast Agreement, and the St Andrews Agreement were also negotiated in the places from which they took their names.

== Implementation ==
Implementation of the Hillsborough Castle Agreement
Section	Implementation
Policing and Justice	The agreement required a resolution under a successful cross-community vote on 9 March 2010. This vote was successfully held. The agreement required that the UK Government detail a timetable for devolving policing and justice functions by 12 April 2010. The statutory instrument was laid before parliament on 31 March 2010, taking effect on 12 April 2010. The Department of Justice was established by the Department of Justice Act (Northern Ireland) 2010.
Parades	While a consultation was held on the Public Assemblies, Parades and Protests Bill 2010, it was not introduced.
Improving Executive Functions	The establishment of an Efficiency Review Panel was announced by the Office of the First Minister and the Deputy First Minister on 9 April 2010. It had not been established by March 10 March 2011.
Outstanding Executive Business	The agreement required the establishment of a working group on outstanding Executive business. By September 2010, the working group met 12 times.
Outstanding St Andrews Review	The agreement required the First Minister and Deputy First Minister to review outstanding issues from the St Andrews Agreement. One issue was an Irish Language Act, which was later passed as the Identity and Language (Northern Ireland) Act 2022.

== See also ==
- Belfast Agreement
- St Andrews Agreement
