= List of medical abbreviations: V =

Abbreviation	Meaning
V	ventilation
VA	visual acuity
VAC	vincristine, actinomycin D, and cyclophosphamide (chemotherapy regimen)
VAC	vacuum-assisted closure (of a wound)
VACTERL	vertebral defects, anal atresia, cardiac defects, tracheo-esophageal fistula, renal, and limb anomalies (VACTERL association)
VAD	ventricular assist device vincristine, adriblastine, dexamethasone
Vag	vaginal
VAI	vincristine, actinomycin D, and ifosfamide (chemotherapy regimen)
VAMP	vesicle-associated membrane protein vincristine, adriblastine, methylprednisone
VAS	vibroacoustic stimulation visual analog scale
VBG	venous blood gases
VBAC	vaginal birth after caesarean
VC	vital capacity
VCTC	voluntary counselling and testing centers (for HIV—government centres in India)
vCJD	variant Creutzfeldt–Jakob disease
VCUG	voiding cystourethrogram
VD	vaginal delivery venereal disease (outdated name for sexually transmitted disease) volume of distribution
VDRF	ventilator-dependent respiratory failure
VDRL	Venereal Diseases Research Laboratory (old test for syphilis)
VE	vaginal examination (manual examination)
VEB	ventricular ectopic beat
VED	Vacuum Erection Device
VEE	Venezuelan equine encephalitis
VF; V-fib	ventricular fibrillation
VFSS	videofluoroscopic swallow study
VH	visual hallucinations vaginal hysterectomy
VHL	Von Hippel–Lindau disease
VIN	vulvar intraepithelial neoplasia
VIR	Vascular Interventional Radiology
VIP	vasoactive intestinal peptide
VLDL	very-low-density lipoprotein
VMA	vanillylmandelic acid violent mechanical asphyxia
VNPI	Van Nuys prognostic scoring index (for ductal carcinoma)
VO	verbal order
VOC	vaso-occlusive crisis
VOD	volume of distribution
VPA	valproic acid
VPAP	variable positive airway pressure
VPB	ventricular premature beats (see premature ventricular contraction)
VPC (PVC)	ventricular premature contraction
VPI	Velopharyngeal insufficiency
V/Q	ventilation/perfusion scan
VRE	vancomycin-resistant enterococcus
VRSA	vancomycin-resistant Staphylococcus aureus
VS	vital signs versus visual snow
VSD	ventricular septal defect
VSR	ventricular septal rupture (see myocardial rupture)
VSS	vital signs stable visual snow syndrome
VT	ventricular tachycardia verotoxin
VTE	venous thromboembolism
VTEC	verotoxin-producing Escherichia coli, also known as enterohaemorrhagic E. coli
VUR	vesicoureteral reflux
VWD	ventral wall defect Von Willebrand disease
VWF	Von Willebrand factor
VZIG	varicella zoster immune globulin
VZV	varicella zoster virus
