= Northern Ireland Library Authority =

Museum service in Northern Ireland

Libraries Act (Northern Ireland) 2008
- Act of the Northern Ireland Assembly
- Northern Ireland Assembly
- Long title: An Act to provide for the establishment and functions of the Northern Ireland Library Authority; to enable the Department of Culture, Arts and Leisure to make grants in connection with the provision of library services; and for connected purposes.
- Citation: 2008 c. 8 (N.I.)

Dates
- Royal assent: 17 June 2008

Status: Current legislation

Text of statute as originally enacted

Text of the Libraries Act (Northern Ireland) 2008 as in force today (including any amendments) within the United Kingdom, from legislation.gov.uk.

Libraries NI (formally the Northern Ireland Library Authority) is a library service in Northern Ireland consisting of all libraries in Northern Ireland. It is headquartered at Lisburn City Library and is sponsored by the Department for Communities to provide 'a dynamic focal point in the community and assists people to fulfil their potential'.

In June 2023, it was announced that the service had significantly reduced its budget for buying new books.

== See also ==
- List of libraries in the United Kingdom
