= Voltage symmetrization system =

Voltage Symmetrization System (VSS) was developed especially for electric power networks with great phase voltage unbalance. It is a three-phase system which enables earth-fault current and charging current elimination. Until now, the operation with earth-fault current compensation has been very complicated for the networks with a great voltage unbalance. In the past, it was necessary to operate such networks with an isolated neutral, solid grounding or with a significantly untuned arc-suppression coil. VSS can also substitute for an arc-suppression coil or it can complement it parallelly. Moreover, it contributes to a better function of earth-fault protections for high-resistance earth faults by equalizing phase-to-earth capacity unbalance. The VSS was patented.

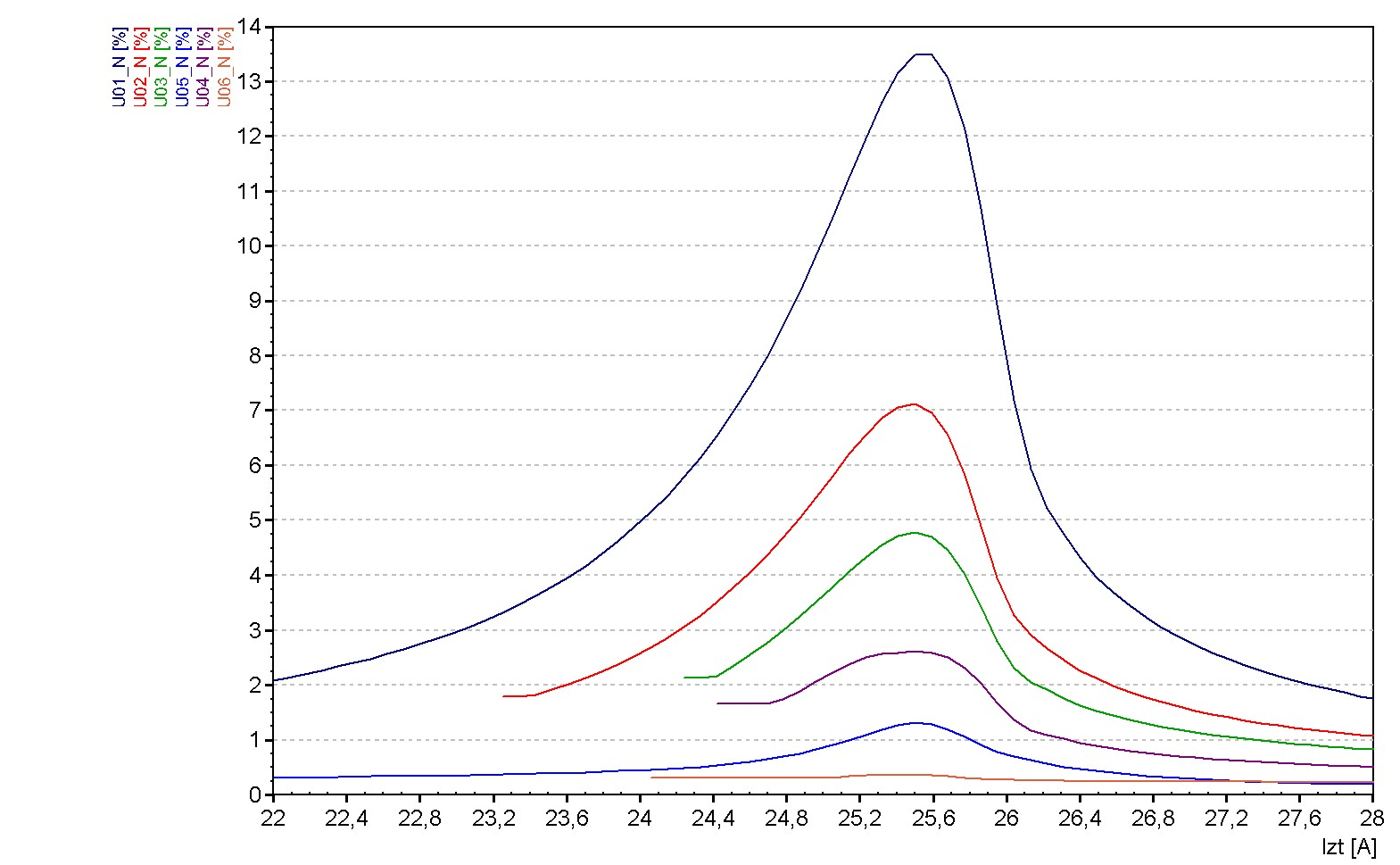
Phase-to-earth capacity unbalance influences zero sequence voltage in the network: the higher the phase-to-earth capacity unbalance, the higher the value of zero sequence voltage during arc-suppression coil tuning, and thus the higher the difference in phase voltage.

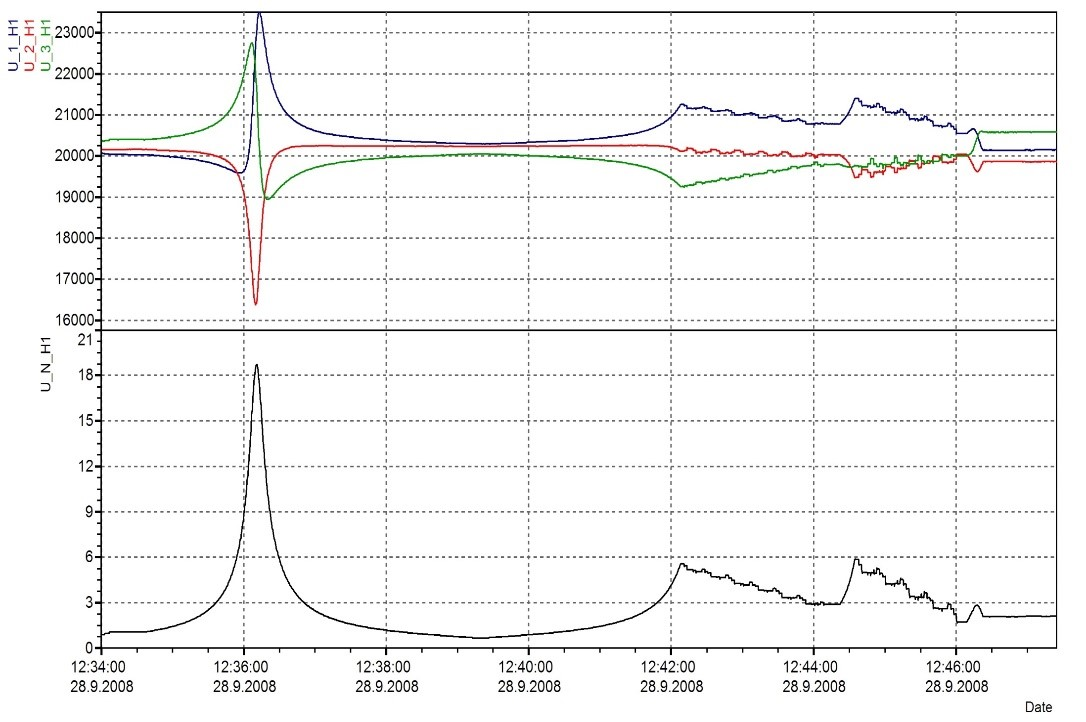
Arc-suppression coil tuning in an unbalanced network with blocked function of automatic voltage symmetrization VSS (see left) and with unblocked function (see right).

The three-phase VSS has several basic functions:

- In a faultless condition:
1. Symmetrization of phase voltage, i.e. elimination of phase voltage unbalance realized by controlling the phase-to-earth capacity unbalance in the network,
2. Reduction of charging current value, i.e. elimination of charging current of phase-to-earth capacity which contributes to reduction of reactive capacity power flow in the network.
- During an earth fault:
1. Elimination of earth-fault current (analogous to an arc-suppression coil,
2. Controlling the residual active earth-fault current.

== Faultless condition ==
If VSS is used for phase voltage unbalance elimination only, it is possible to operate it with a relatively low power. The VSS can effectively eliminate and control the phase voltage unbalance, which is caused by phase-to-ground capacity unbalance. The system enables to automatically maintain phase-to-ground capacity unbalance of the network in the range of assigned parameters, and thus provides the network with symmetrical phase voltage in the assigned range as well. In particular cases, the VSS can be used for artificial increase in phase voltage unbalance of the network, mostly for a short-time period during earth-fault localization in the network.

=== Reduction of charging current value in a faultless condition ===
If VSS is used for line's charging current elimination, it is not necessary to install shunt reactor. In single-phase cable lines, the VSS can eliminate the whole charging current because the operational capacity comprises phase-to-ground capacity only. In three-phase and overhead lines, the operational capacity comprises not only of phase-to-ground capacity but also of phase-to-phase capacity. VSS eliminates only charging currents of phase-to-ground capacity in these networks, which stands for 60% to 70% of line's operational capacity value (VSS is not designated for elimination of phase-to-phase capacity charging current in the lines). VSS contributes to a significant reduction of charging reactive power flow.

== Elimination of earth-fault current during an earth fault ==
The advantage of the system is that it does not require a neutral to eliminate the earth-fault current. Therefore, the VSS has been implemented especially in networks which were operated with isolated neutral. During an earth fault in the network, the system eliminates earth-fault current. The function is in principle similar to an arc-suppression coil. In comparison to the arc-suppression coil, VSS eliminates earth-fault current more efficiently, even in unbalanced or extremely unbalanced networks.

== Controlling the residual active earth-fault current during an earth fault ==
VSS enables to control the magnitude of residual active earth-fault current. This can be applied to improve the function of directional ground protection or to decrease great active earth-fault current in the network. Such quality is used in networks with great active earth-fault current value, for instance in large cable lines.

== Note ==
As VSS does not require neutral for its connection, it can be connected anywhere in the network. At the same time, it is possible to adjust its power to a certain part of the network only, which can be use in local distribution networks or in long feeders, in feeders with high value of charging current, or in feeders with high capacity unbalance. The part of the network in which VSS is installed does not increase the value of phase-to-earth capacity current in power supply network. Furthermore, the value of network's charging current decreases by the set system power. The VSS is very beneficial in networks with island operation. In island operation, the source is not loaded by charging current of the line and the separated island area is operated with resonant grounding. Such qualities cannot be reached with a classic arc-suppression coil.

== Operational experience of VSS since 2005 ==
VSS systems have been installed in industrial 6 kV networks as well as in standard distribution networks up to 35 kV. Operational experience proved that VSS can eliminate even extremely high cross parameters unbalance in the network without negatively influencing the function of earth fault protection. Thanks to elimination of phase capacity unbalance, high reliability of directional ground protection can be reached even with high-resistance earth-faults. The possibility of operating the network with accurately compensated phase-to-earth capacity currents contributes to higher safety of the network operation.
