= Castle Buildings =

Group of buildings in Belfast, Northern Ireland

Coordinates: 54.598199°N 5.81533°W

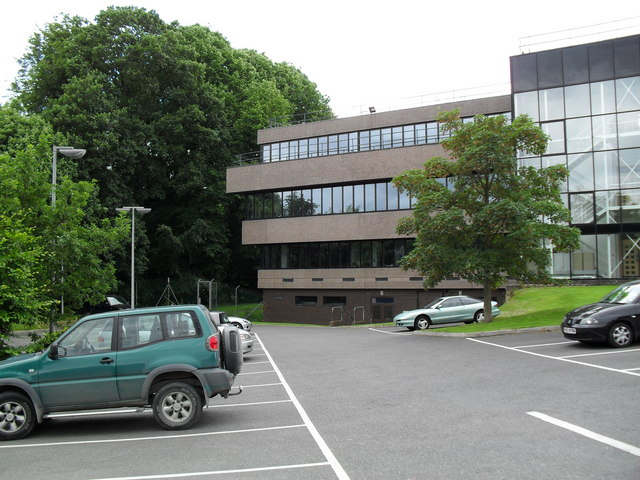
Castle Buildings

Castle Buildings is the name given to a group of Northern Ireland Executive buildings in the Stormont Estate in Belfast, Northern Ireland. The complex is notable as the location of the negotiations leading to the Good Friday Agreement.

Castle Buildings are the headquarters for the Department of Health and the Department of Justice, who it was announced would be based in two offices on the first floor on 29 July 2009. The group of buildings is also used by the Executive Office and previously by the Northern Ireland Office.

== See also ==
- First Minister and deputy First Minister
- The Executive Office
- Department of Health
- Department of Justice
- Belfast Agreement
- Northern Ireland Office
