= Foyle, Carlingford and Irish Lights Commission =

Cross-border lighthouse and fisheries body on the island of Ireland

The Foyle, Carlingford and Irish Lights Commission (FCILC) is a commission supervised by the North/South Ministerial Council with responsibility for two agencies which span the Irish border, namely the Loughs Agency and the Lights Agency. The FCIC is one of the implementation bodies (or "cross-border bodies") established in 1999 under the 1998 British–Irish Agreement during the Northern Ireland peace process.

== Lights Agency ==
The Lights Agency is intended to succeed the Commissioners of Irish Lights in managing lighthouses around the coast of Ireland; however, this process has been stalled by administrative and legal complications.

== Loughs Agency ==
The Loughs Agency (Irish: Gníomhaireacht na Lochanna; Ulster Scots: Factrie fur Loughs) manages fisheries in Carlingford Lough and Lough Foyle — the sea loughs at the southeastern and northwestern ends respectively of the land border between Northern Ireland and the Republic of Ireland — as well as the basin of the River Foyle, which forms part of the border and flows into Lough Foyle. The Loughs Agency is the successor of the Foyle Fisheries Commission, established in 1952 by the Government of Ireland and the Government of Northern Ireland to bypass their dispute over which had sovereignty over Lough Foyle and the river channel.
