= Ulster-Scots Community Network =

Organisation in Northern Ireland

The Ulster-Scots Community Network, previously known as the Ulster-Scots Heritage Council, was established in 1995 as an umbrella organisation to represent the Ulster Scots community. The organisation, which is based in Belfast, is registered as a charity with the Charity Commission for Northern Ireland. It is involved in "highlight[ing] the significant contribution of the Ulster-Scots community to the development of life in Northern Ireland, the border counties of the Republic of Ireland, and the wider Ulster-Scots diaspora", and has published a number of works on Ulster-Scots history. In 2023/2024, the organisation received most of its funding from the Ulster-Scots Agency (£408,000) and Arts Council of Northern Ireland (£33,800), and expended approximately £300,000 on salaries and staffing costs.
