= Northern Ireland Conservatives election results =

UK political party election results

This article lists the Northern Ireland Conservatives election results in UK parliamentary elections.

== Summary of general election performance ==
| Year | Number of candidates | Total votes |
|---|---|---|
| 1992 | 11 | 44,608 |
| 1997 | 8 | 9,858 |
| 2001 | 3 | 2,422 |
| 2005 | 3 | 2,718 |
| 2010 | 17 (UCU-NF) | 102,631 |
| 2015 | 16 | 9,055 |
| 2017 | 7 | 2,399 |
| 2019 | 4 | 5,433 |
| 2024 | 5 | 553 |

== 1987–1992 by-elections ==
| Election | Candidate | Votes | % | Position |
|---|---|---|---|---|
| 1990 Upper Bann by-election | Colette Jones | 1,038 | 3.0 | 6 |

== 1992 general election ==
| Constituency | Candidate | Votes | % | Position |
|---|---|---|---|---|
| Belfast East | David Greene | 3,314 | 9.3 | 3 |
| Belfast North | Margaret Redpath | 2,107 | 5.9 | 5 |
| Belfast South | Andrew Fee | 3,356 | 10.0 | 4 |
| East Antrim | Myrtle Boal | 3,359 | 8.6 | 4 |
| East Londonderry | Alan Elder | 1,589 | 3.0 | 5 |
| Lagan Valley | Timothy R. Coleridge | 4,423 | 9.0 | 4 |
| North Antrim | Richard Sowler | 2,263 | 5.0 | 5 |
| North Down | Laurence Kennedy | 14,371 | 32.0 | 2 |
| South Down | Stephanie McKenzie-Hill | 1,488 | 2.4 | 5 |
| Strangford | Stephen Eyre | 6,782 | 15.1 | 4 |
| Upper Bann | Collette Jones | 1,556 | 3.4 | 5 |

== By-elections, 1992–1997 ==
| Election | Candidate | Votes | % | Position |
|---|---|---|---|---|
| 1995 North Down by-election | Stuart Sexton | 583 | 2.1 | 5 |

== 1997 general election ==
| Constituency | Candidate | Votes | % | Position |
|---|---|---|---|---|
| Belfast East | Sarah Dines | 928 | 2.4 | 4 |
| Belfast South | Myrtle Boal | 962 | 2.4 | 7 |
| East Antrim | Terence Dick | 2,334 | 6.8 | 4 |
| East Londonderry | James Holmes | 436 | 1.0 | 6 |
| Lagan Valley | Stuart E. Sexton | 1,212 | 2.7 | 5 |
| North Down | Leonard Fee | 1,810 | 5.0 | 4 |
| Strangford | Gilbert Chalk | 1,743 | 4.2 | 5 |
| Upper Bann | Brian Price | 433 | 0.9 | 7 |

== 2001 general election ==
| Constituency | Candidate | Votes | % | Position |
|---|---|---|---|---|
| Belfast East | Terry Dick | 800 | 2.2 | 7 |
| East Antrim | Alan Greer | 807 | 2.2 | 7 |
| North Down | Julian Robertson | 815 | 2.2 | 4 |

== 2005 general election ==
| Constituency | Candidate | Votes | % | Position |
|---|---|---|---|---|
| Belfast East | Alan Greer | 434 | 1.4 | 6 |
| North Down | Julian Robertson | 822 | 2.5 | 5 |
| Strangford | Terry Dick | 1,462 | 3.9 | 5 |

== 2010 general election ==
Candidates stood as part of an electoral alliance with the Ulster Unionist Party with the ballot paper description Ulster Conservatives and Unionists - New Force.

| Constituency | Candidate | Votes | % | Position |
|---|---|---|---|---|
| Belfast East | Trevor Ringland | 7,305 | 21.2 | 3 |
| Belfast North | Fred Cobain | 2,837 | 7.7 | 4 |
| Belfast South | Paula Bradshaw | 5,910 | 17.3 | 3 |
| Belfast West | Bill Manwaring | 1,000 | 3.1 | 4 |
| East Antrim | Rodney McCune | 7,223 | 23.7 | 2 |
| East Londonderry | Lesley Macaulay | 6,218 | 17.8 | 3 |
| Foyle | David Harding | 1,221 | 3.2 | 5 |
| Lagan Valley | Daphne Trimble | 7,713 | 21.1 | 2 |
| Mid Ulster | Sandra Overend | 4,509 | 11.0 | 4 |
| Newry and Armagh | Danny Kennedy | 8,558 | 19.1 | 3 |
| North Antrim | Irwin Armstrong | 4,634 | 10.9 | 4 |
| North Down | Ian Parsley | 6,817 | 20.4 | 2 |
| South Antrim | Reg Empey | 10,353 | 30.4 | 2 |
| South Down | John McCallister | 3,093 | 7.3 | 4 |
| Strangford | Mike Nesbitt | 9,050 | 27.8 | 2 |
| Upper Bann | Harry Hamilton | 10,639 | 25.7 | 2 |
| West Tyrone | Ross Hussey | 5,281 | 14.2 | 3 |

== 2015 general election ==
| Constituency | Candidate | Votes | % | Position |
|---|---|---|---|---|
| Belfast East | Neil Wilson | 1,121 | 2.8 | 3 |
| Belfast South | Ben Manton | 582 | 1.5 | 8 |
| Belfast West | Paul Shea | 34 | 0.1 | 9 |
| East Antrim | Alex Wilson | 549 | 1.6 | 8 |
| East Londonderry | Liz St Clair-Legge | 422 | 1.2 | 7 |
| Foyle | Hamish Badenoch | 132 | 0.4 | 7 |
| Lagan Valley | Helen Osborne | 654 | 1.6 | 9 |
| Mid Ulster | Lucille Nicholson | 120 | 0.3 | 9 |
| Newry and Armagh | Robert Rigby | 210 | 0.4 | 5 |
| North Antrim | Carol-Anne Freeman | 368 | 0.9 | 8 |
| North Down | Mark Brotherston | 1,593 | 4.4 | 5 |
| South Antrim | Alan Dunlop | 415 | 1.1 | 7 |
| South Down | Felicity Buchan | 318 | 0.7 | 6 |
| Strangford | Johnny Andrews | 2,167 | 6.4 | 6 |
| Upper Bann | Amandeep Singh Bhogal | 201 | 0.4 | 8 |
| West Tyrone | Claire-Louise Leyland | 169 | 0.4 | 8 |

== 2017 general election ==
| Constituency | Candidate | Votes | % | Position |
|---|---|---|---|---|
| Belfast East | Sheila Bodel | 446 | 1.0 | 6 |
| Belfast South | Clare Salier | 246 | 0.6 | 7 |
| East Antrim | Mark Logan | 963 | 2.5 | 6 |
| East Londonderry | Liz St Clair-Legge | 330 | 0.8 | 6 |
| Lagan Valley | Ian Nickels | 462 | 1.0 | 6 |
| North Down | Frank Shivers | 941 | 2.4 | 5 |
| Strangford | Claire Hiscott | 507 | 1.3 | 7 |

== 2019 general election ==
| Constituency | Candidate | Votes | % | Position |
|---|---|---|---|---|
| East Antrim | Aaron Rankin | 1,043 | 2.8 | 5 |
| Lagan Valley | Gary Hynds | 955 | 2.1 | 6 |
| North Down | Matthew Robinson | 1,959 | 4.8 | 4 |
| Strangford | Grant Abraham | 1,476 | 3.9 | 5 |

== 2024 general election ==
| Constituency | Candidate | Votes | % | Position |
|---|---|---|---|---|
| East Londonderry | Claire Scull | 187 | 0.5 | 9 |
| Newry and Armagh | Samantha Rayner | 83 | 0.2 | 8 |
| South Down | Hannah Westropp | 46 | 0.1 | 9 |
| Strangford | Barry Hetherington | 146 | 0.4 | 10 |
| West Tyrone | Stephen Lynch | 91 | 0.2 | 8 |
