= Waterways Ireland =

Irish water company

Coordinates: 54.3432°N 7.6482°W

Waterways Ireland Uiscebhealaí Éireann (Irish) Watterweys Airlann (Ulster-Scots)

Implementation body overview
- Formed: 1999
- Jurisdiction: Northern Ireland; Republic of Ireland
- Headquarters: Enniskillen, County Fermanagh
- Parent department: Northern Ireland Executive; Government of Ireland
- Key document: Belfast Agreement, 1999
- Website: www.waterwaysireland.org

Waterways Ireland (Irish: Uiscebhealaí Éireann; Ulster-Scots: Watterweys Airlann) is one of the six all-Ireland North/South implementation bodies established under the Belfast Agreement in 1999. It is responsible for the management, maintenance, development, and restoration of inland navigable waterways primarily for recreational purposes. Included as inland waterways are the Barrow Navigation, the Erne System, the Grand Canal, the Lower Bann, the Royal Canal, the Shannon–Erne Waterway and the Shannon Navigation.

Waterways Ireland has its headquarters in Enniskillen, Northern Ireland, and regional offices in Carrick-on-Shannon, Dublin, and Scarriff in the Republic of Ireland.

The Waterways Ireland Visitor Centre is located at 2 Grand Canal Quay, Ringsend, Dublin. The building was constructed on the waters of the inner basin of Grand Canal Dock.

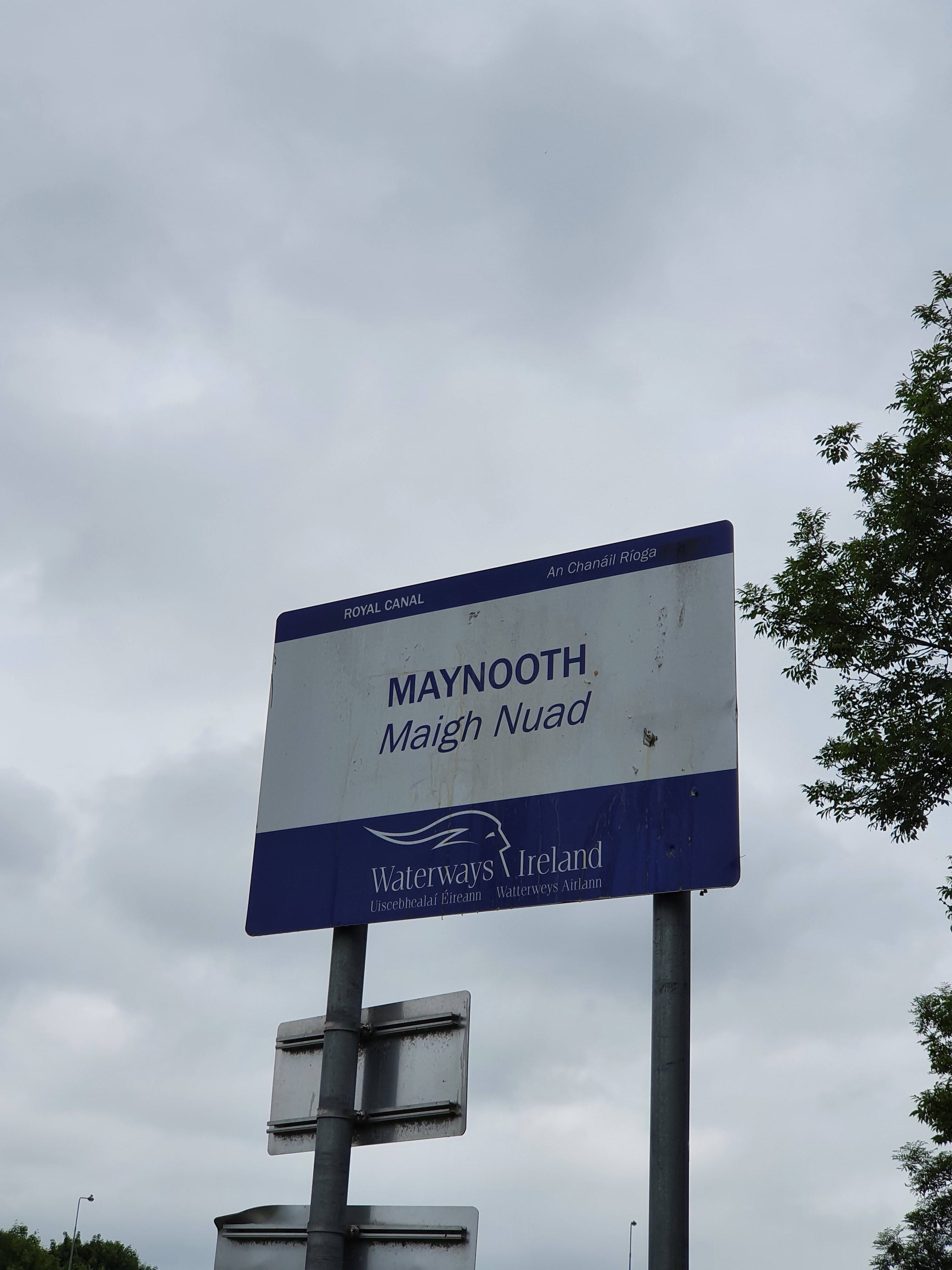
Waterways Ireland signpost alongside the Royal Canal upon entering Maynooth in County Kildare.

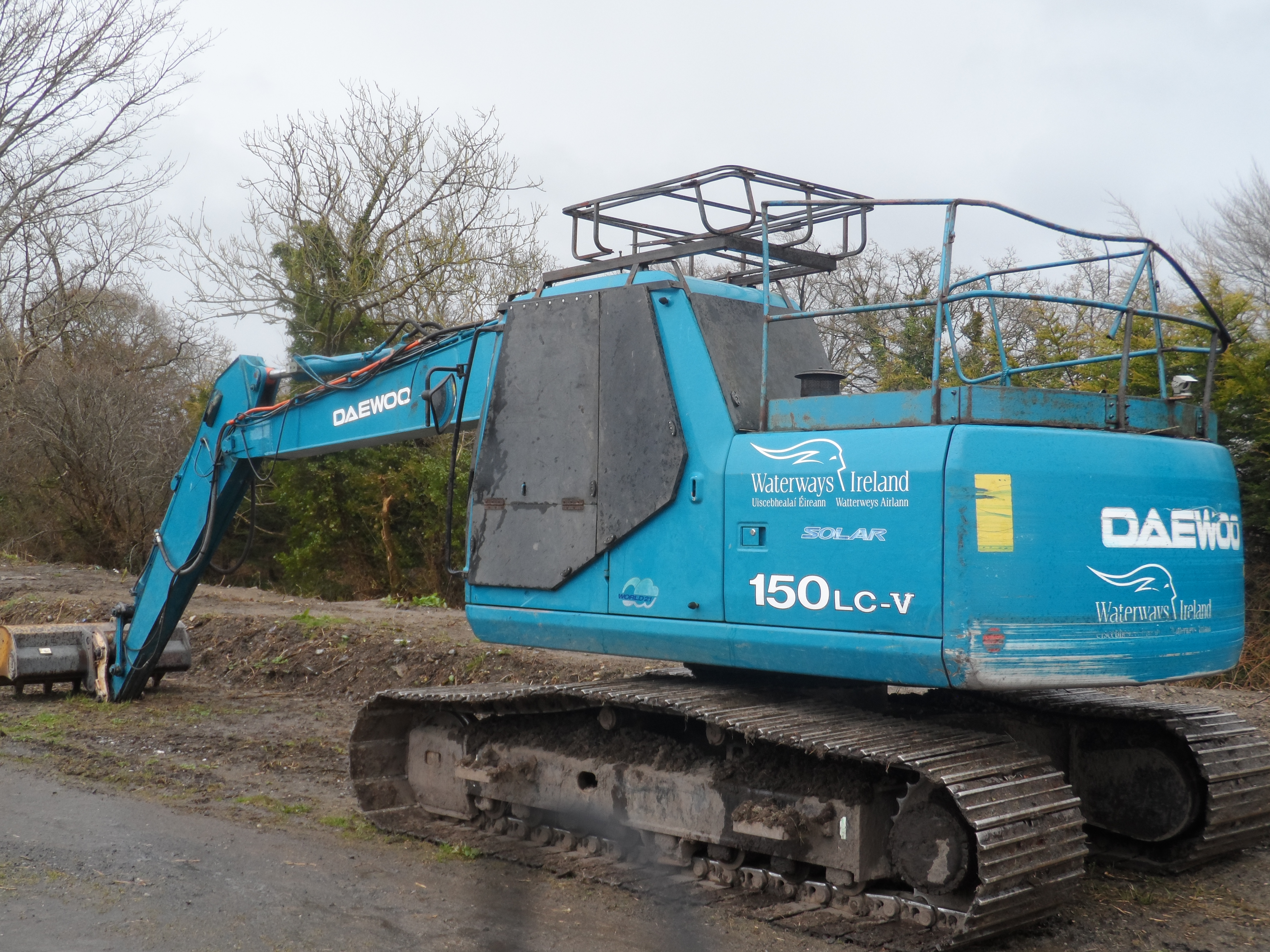
Waterways Ireland Daewoo Solar 150LC-V crawler excavator, used for canal maintenance.

== See also ==
- Canals of Ireland
- Rivers of Ireland
