= The North/South Language Body =

The North/South Language Body (Irish: An Foras Teanga Thuaidh/Theas; Ulster-Scots: Tha Noarth/Sooth Boord o Leid or The Language Curn) is an implementation body, provided for by the Belfast Agreement, that exists to implement policies agreed by Ministers in the North/South Ministerial Council (NSMC) in Republic of Ireland and Northern Ireland with regard to the Irish and Ulster-Scots (or "Ullans") languages on a cross border all Island basis.

It is a single body reporting to the North/South Ministerial Council, but composed of two separate and largely autonomous agencies: Foras na Gaeilge, the Irish language agency, and Tha Boord o Ulstèr-Scotch, the Ulster-Scots Agency.

== See also ==
- Bòrd na Gàidhlig
- Welsh Language Commissioner
