= Northern Ireland Prisoner Ombudsman =

The office of the Prisoner Ombudsman for Northern Ireland, was first established in Northern Ireland in 2005.

The office's governing statutes are the Justice (Northern Ireland) Act 2004, the Northern Ireland Act 1998 (Devolution of Policing and Justice Functions) Order 2010 and the Justice Act (Northern Ireland) 2016

The ombudsman's function are to:

- investigate complaints submitted to it by individual prisoners whose complaints were not resolved by the Prison Service Internal Complaints Process
- complete death in custody investigations, as well as answering family concerns; identifying any learning points for the prison service.
- investigate complaints submitted to it by individual prisoners whose complaints or concerns were not resolved by the Visit Manager
