= Office of The Industrial Tribunals and The Fair Employment Tribunal =

Office of the Industrial Tribunal and the Fair Employment Tribunal
Non-Departmental Public Body overview
- Jurisdiction: Northern Ireland
- Headquarters: Killymeal House, Belfast
- Minister responsible: Minister for the Economy
- Website: www.economy-ni.gov.uk

The Office of the Industrial Tribunals and Fair Employment Tribunal (OITFET) is a Government body in Northern Ireland which is responsible for the facilitation of employment tribunals. Industrial tribunals are independent judicial bodies in Northern Ireland that hear and determine claims to do with employment matters. These include a range of claims relating to unfair dismissal, breach of contract, wages and other payments as well as discrimination on the grounds of sex, race discrimination, disability discrimination, sexual orientation, age, part-time working and equal pay. The Fair Employment Tribunal is an independent judicial body in Northern Ireland that hears and determines complaints of discrimination on the grounds of religious belief or political opinion. It is staffed by 59 personnel responsible for the administration and organisation of the tribunals. The staff are provided by the Department for the Economy (DfE) and the team is led by the Secretary of the Tribunals.

== Industrial Tribunals ==
The jurisdiction of an industrial tribunal to hear and determine complaints is subject to Article 85 of the Fair Employment and Treatment (Northern Ireland) Order 1998.

Where a complaint has been made to the Fair Employment Tribunal of unlawful discrimination on the grounds of religious belief or political opinion and it appears that this complaint is one in respect of which:

  - a complaint could be made to an industrial tribunal under any other statutory provision; or
  - a complaint has been made to an industrial tribunal which has not been disposed of;

then the President or Vice President may direct that these matters shall be heard by the Fair Employment Tribunal and not by an industrial tribunal. For these purposes the Fair Employment Tribunal has the jurisdiction and powers of an industrial tribunal. Before such a direction is made however, a notice will be sent to those concerned, giving them an opportunity to show cause why such a direction should not be made.

Industrial Tribunals sit mainly in Belfast but in certain circumstances may use other centres throughout Northern Ireland.

== Fair Employment Tribunals ==
The Fair Employment Tribunal deals with claims of discrimination on the grounds of religious belief or political opinion.

The statutory regulations governing its proceedings are The Fair Employment Tribunal (Rules of Procedure) Regulations (Northern Ireland) 2005. Tribunals are like courts but are not as formal; for example, nobody wears a wig or a gown. However like a court it must act independently and cannot give legal advice. Almost all hearings are open to the public. The Fair Employment Tribunal sits in Belfast. Persons (or other bodies) bringing claims to a tribunal are known as claimants and those against whom such claims are brought are known as respondents.
