= Ulster-Scots Agency =

All-Ireland body promoting Ulster-Scots

The Ulster-Scots Agency (Ulster-Scots: Tha Boord o Ulstèr-Scotch) is a cross-border body for Ireland which seeks to "promote the study, conservation and development of Ulster-Scots as a living language, to encourage and develop the full range of its attendant culture, and to promote an understanding of the history of the Ulster-Scots [people]."

== Purpose ==
The remit of the agency is "the promotion of greater awareness and the use of Ullans and of Ulster-Scots cultural issues, both within Northern Ireland and the Republic of Ireland." "Ullans" and "Ulster-Scots cultural issues" are defined in inter-governmental agreement and enshrined in legislation as follows:

"Ullans" is to be understood as the variety of the Scots language traditionally found in parts of Northern Ireland and Donegal. "Ulster-Scots cultural issues" relate to the cultural traditions of the part of the population of Northern Ireland and the border counties which is of Scottish ancestry and the influence of their cultural traditions on others, both within the island of Ireland and in the rest of the world.

== Structure and funding ==
The agency is part of The North/South Language Body, established as a result of the Belfast Agreement of 1998. Its counterpart is Foras na Gaeilge, which was set up to promote the Irish language. The two bodies work together on some events, such as the National Ploughing Championships and the Balmoral Show.

It has its head office in the Corn Exchange Building in Belfast, and a regional office in Raphoe, in eastern County Donegal (one of the three counties of the historical province of Ulster in the Republic of Ireland).

=== Governance ===
The agency is overseen by an eight-member board, appointed by the North/South Ministerial Council.

=== Staff ===
Answering to the Board but with day-to-day executive authority is the CEO. In turn there are directors for education and language, community and promotion, and corporate services. The staff levels have always been modest, reported as around 16 in 2015.

=== Funding ===
It is jointly funded by the Department for Communities (tha Depairtment fur Commonities in Ulster-Scots) in Northern Ireland and the Department of Culture, Communications and Sport in the Republic of Ireland.

== Work ==
The agency delivers some projects itself, but also provides grants to charitable and community groups for language, musical and dance events. Bigger events include festivals and summer schools, but small projects are also supported.

School visits and fairs are a major area of activity.

Projects which have been undertaken include an audio-recording survey of native speakers, the compilation of a two-way Ulster Scots/English dictionary, a text base of written Ulster Scots, and an expert translation service.

=== Ulster-Scots Discovery Centre ===
In the same building as the agency's HQ, but with a separate entrance, the agency operates a Discovery Centre, which includes exhibitions about the language and its history, and has space for groups to study further.

=== Supported bodies ===
Relevant bodies to which the agency provides funding include the Ulster-Scots Language Society, Ullans Speakers Association and the Ulster-Scots Community Network.

=== Publications ===
The agency publishes an English-language newsletter, albeit with some token Scots, several times a year, entitled The Ulster-Scot, as a supplement to the Belfast News Letter. The publication has also been made available free of charge upon request. An e-bulletin is also issued. Further publications are planned over time.

==== Websites ====
Aside from its main website, the agency operates sites around the plantation of Ulster, settlements in the United States, and Rathlin Island.

== See also ==
- Ulster Scots
- Languages in the United Kingdom
- List of language regulators
