= Victims and Survivors Service =

Public agency in Northern Ireland

Agency overview
- Formed: 2012
- Jurisdiction: Northern Ireland
- Headquarters: Seatem House, 28-32 Alfred Street, Belfast
- Agency executive: Andrew Walker, Chief Executive Officer
- Parent department: Executive Office
- Website: www.victimsservice.org

The Victims and Survivors Service is a non-departmental public body in Northern Ireland, established in 2012 to deliver support and services to improve the health and wellbeing of victims and survivors of The Troubles and associated conflict.

In March 2023, was announced that the service had been granted an additional £15,000,000 to support victims and survivors: 26 health and wellbeing caseworkers across Northern Ireland, Ireland, and Great Britain. In its first year of operation, the trauma network helped over 9,000 people.

== See also ==
- Executive Office (Northern Ireland)
