= Safefood =

Food safety authority on the island of Ireland

Public Body overview
- Formed: 1999
- Jurisdiction: Northern Ireland, Republic of Ireland
- Headquarters: Cork, Republic of Ireland
- Public Body executive: Dr Joanne Uí Chrualaoich (CEO)
- Website: www.safefood.net

Safefood (formally The Food Safety Promotion Board; FSPB; Irish: An Bord um Chur Chun Cinn Sabháilteachta Bia; Ulster-Scots: Tha Mait Safétie Fordèrin Boord or The Meat Sauftie Forder Buird), is an all-island public body responsible for raising consumer awareness and promoting food safety and healthy eating across the island of Ireland (both Northern Ireland and the Republic of Ireland). Founded in 1999, Safefood is one of six North-South implementation bodies established jointly by the British and Irish governments under the terms of the 1998 British-Irish Agreement Act.

== History and legal basis ==
Safefood was established in 1999 as part of the institutions created by the Belfast/Good Friday Agreement. Its legal basis and functions are set out in the British-Irish Agreement Act 1999 (Ireland) and the North/South Co-operation (Implementation Bodies) (Northern Ireland) Order 1999 (UK). The organisation operates under the policy direction of the North/South Ministerial Council

== Function ==
Safefood's statutory functions, as proscribed in law (British Irish Agreement Act 1999, annex I, part 2), are:

- Promotion of food safety
- Commissioning and communicating research into food safety
- Communication of food alerts
- Surveillance of foodborne disease
- Promotion of scientific co-operation and laboratory linkages
- Development of cost-effective facilities for specialised laboratory testing

== Organisation structure and governance ==
Safefood's headquarters are in Little Island, Cork, with a second office in central Dublin. Funding is provided by the Oireachtas in Ireland and the Northern Ireland Assembly; in recent years, funding has been apportioned 70% from Ireland’s Department of Health and 30% from Northern Ireland’s Department of Health.

The organisation has a Chief Executive Officer and four directorates - Communications, Corporate Operations, Nutrition, and Food Safety - with oversight from the North/South Ministerial Council (NSMC), an Advisory Board and the Safefood Advisory Committee. As of 2026, the CEO is Dr Joanne Uí Chrualaoich.

== Activities ==
Safefood is a multidisciplinary organisation employing expertise in both food science and nutrition. The body's research, educational, and promotional activities centre on the subjects of food safety and healthy eating and are delivered via media campaigns (e.g. television and radio advertisements and social media) and the publication of information resources for consumers and other stakeholders.

Examples of Safefood consumer campaigns on tackling excess weight and obesity amongst adults include Stop the Spread and Weigh-2-Live, while Safefood's If you Could see the Germs Spread campaign aims to raise awareness amongst consumers of the health risks associated with poor food hygiene practices in the home.

== Website and audiences ==
Safefood operates a dual-audience website:

- Public- consumer-focused food safety and healthy eating advice, recipes, and seasonal guidance.
- Professional- resources for food safety, nutrition and education professionals, including the Knowledge Network, research reports, training (e.g., Safefood for Business) and sector events.

== Campaigns ==
Campaigns run by the agency have included:

- "Building a healthier food environment" (launched June 2024): a five-year public health campaign focusing on how the food environment influences choices, with an emphasis on protecting children’s health; parallel activity in Northern Ireland.
- "Safe2Eat" (EFSA partnership) (2025): Safefood represents Ireland in the EU-wide consumer education campaign (formerly #EUChooseSafeFood) led by EFSA.
- Food safety seasonal initiatives: ongoing campaigns including “Trust the Meat Thermometer” (originated 2021; continues for BBQ and Christmas cooking safety).
- Community and research-led initiatives: expansion of Community Food Initiatives 2025–28 (€1.5m; 28 projects); ongoing Healthy Food Basket research series (ROI and NI).
