= InterTradeIreland =

InterTradeIreland (ITI) is an all-Ireland economic development agency. Established in 1999, it seeks to "boost cross-border economic co-operation" between Northern Ireland and the Republic of Ireland. As of 2025, ITI had reportedly supported approximately 60,000 businesses and "generated €1.95bn/£1.7bn in business development value".

As one of the cross-border bodies established under the Good Friday/Belfast Agreement, InterTradeIreland is funded by the Department of Enterprise, Tourism and Employment in the Republic of Ireland and the Department for the Economy (DfE) in Northern Ireland.

As of 2023, ITI had approximately 40 permanent staff. It is based in Newry, County Down.
