= Special EU Programmes Body =

Cross-border British–Irish government body

The Special EU Programmes Body (SEUPB) (Irish: Comhlacht na gClár Speisialta AE; Ulster-Scots: Tha By-Ordnar CE Dargs Convenerie) is a cross-border body in the United Kingdom and Republic of Ireland which co-ordinates projects funded by the European Union and implemented in Northern Ireland and adjacent regions: the Border region of the Republic of Ireland, and Western Scotland. The SEUPB is one of six cross-border bodies established after the 1998 Belfast Agreement, given statutory force by Section V of both the North/South Co-operation (Implementation Bodies) (Northern Ireland) Order 1999 and the British-Irish Agreement Act, 1999 in the UK and Republic respectively. SEUPB receives and disburses funds under two EU programs: Interreg IVA (€256 m) and Peace III (€333 m). It may also compete for Interreg IVB and IVC funds. It reports to the European Commission, the Northern Ireland Executive and the Government of Ireland.

== Peace III ==
The EU Programme for Peace & Reconciliation in Northern Ireland and the Border Region of Ireland, known as Peace III, aims to "reinforce progress towards a peaceful and stable society and promote reconciliation".

The previous programmes were Peace I (1995–1999) and Peace II (2000–2004).

== PEACE PLUS ==
In July 2022, a new €1.1 billion / £1 billion "PEACE PLUS" programme was announced, to be administered by SEUPB, jointly funded by the UK and the EU, and with the Northern Ireland Executive and Irish Government providing matching funding. PEACE PLUS expires in 2027.

== Impact of Brexit ==
As part of the Brexit withdrawal agreement, the European Union, Ireland and United Kingdom had committed to continue the funding of the Special EU Programmes Body until at least 2023. In 2022, they announced joint EU-UK funding of the programme would extend until at least 2027.
