= 2002 Belfast riots =

2002 Belfast riots may refer to:

- Holy Cross dispute
- May 2002 Belfast riots
- 2002 Short Strand clashes
