= Cluan Place =

Area in Belfast, Northern Ireland

Coordinates: 54.59567°N 5.90395°W

Cluan Place (derived from Irish Cluain 'meadow') is a Protestant working-class area in eastern inner-city Belfast, in Northern Ireland.

There is currently a peace line, separating the area from Roman Catholic Short Strand. Rioting between neighbouring Loyalist and Republican factions has been a feature of the area's recent past. See Battle of Saint Matthew's and 2002 Short Strand clashes. CCTV has been introduced along the peace line in an attempt to deter anti-social behaviour and sectarian attacks.
