= Interface area =

Area in Northern Ireland where nationalist and unionist neighborhoods meet

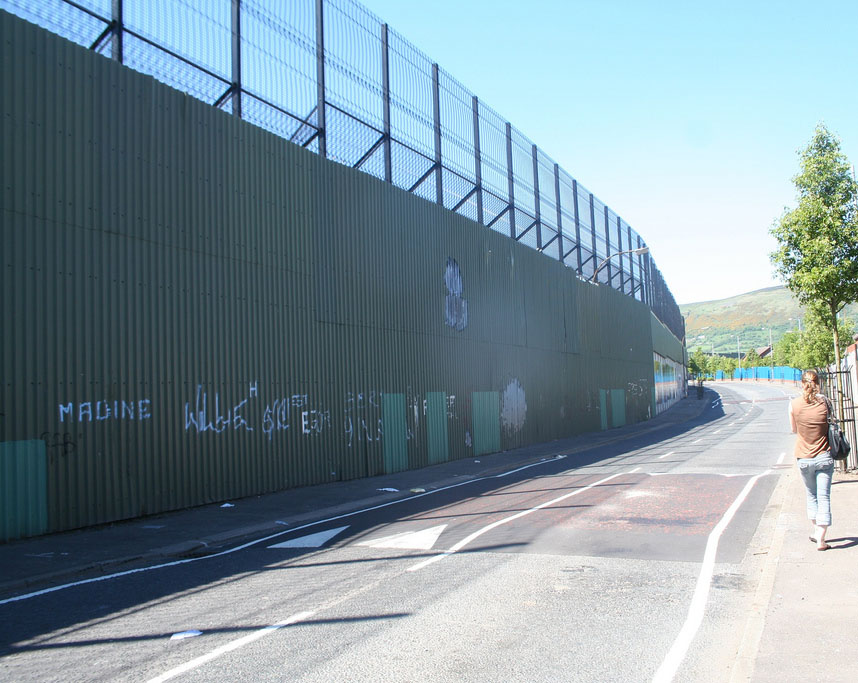
The "peace line" along Cupar Way in West Belfast

Interface area is the name given in Northern Ireland to areas where segregated nationalist and unionist residential areas meet. They have been defined as "the intersection of segregated and polarised working class residential zones, in areas with a strong link between territory and ethno-political identity".

== Characteristics ==
Interface areas are sometimes bounded by the defensive barriers known as peace lines, and can be identified at their perimeter by painted kerbs or flags, demarcating the territorial affiliation of the area. However, this is not always the case, so people not local to the area are not always aware of the existence of interface areas. They are sometimes the sites of sectarian violence, when they have become known as "flashpoints".

== Key interface areas ==
=== North Belfast ===
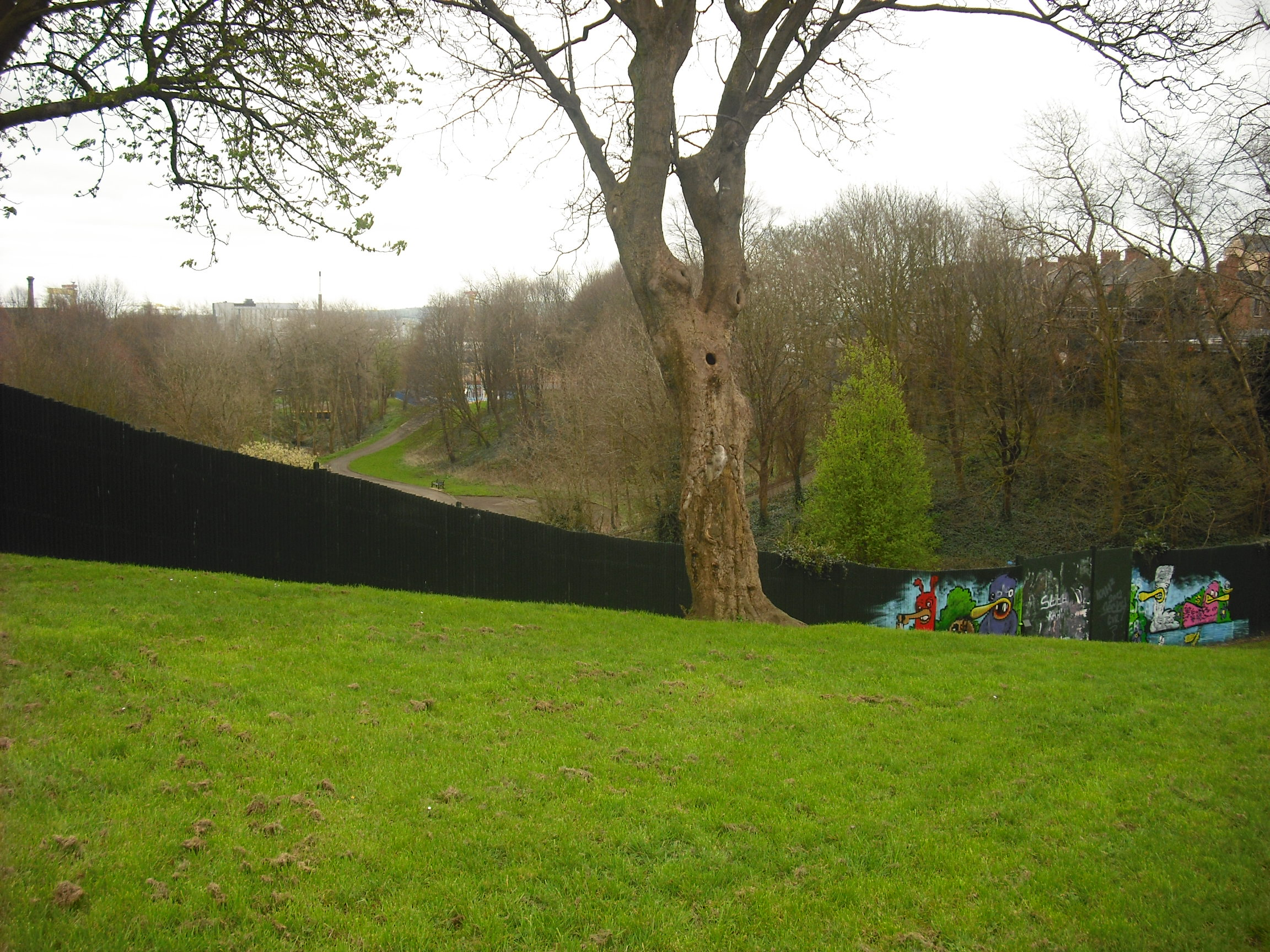
Alexandra Park fence, viewed from the Antrim Road side

North Belfast is home to a number of interface areas. One of the most famous is Holy Cross in the Ardoyne area of Belfast, which was the site of significant disputes in 2001 and 2002. Another significant area is that between the lower Antrim Road and the lower Shore Road which was seen as such a flashpoint in 1994 that a three-metre high (10') 'peace wall' was added to Alexandra Park, a public amenity straddling both areas. Alexandra Park is believed to be the only park in western Europe to be divided by such a wall, effectively dividing the park between the two adjacent communities. The wall remains in place although a gate was added in 2011 permitting limited access from one side to the other.

A major interface also exists at Duncairn Gardens between the Irish republican New Lodge area of the Antrim Road and the neighbouring Ulster loyalist Tiger's Bay area. Clashes here date back to at least the early 1970s when local "defence associations" formed by loyalists became part of the wider Ulster Defence Association. Trouble in the area has been a regular feature with petrol bombs thrown in 2000 and 2001 after local UDA Brigadier Jimbo Simpson claimed that republican housing was starting to encroach into Tiger's Bay. The Limestone Road, which runs parallel to Duncairn Gardens, also provides a dividing line, with the Parkside and Newington areas being largely Irish nationalist and the Tiger's Bay and Halliday's Road area mainly unionist (although a small section of Halliday's Road forms the edge of the New Lodge area and is divided from the rest of the road as a result). There have also been divisions around the Antrim Road between the Protestant Westland Road and the Catholic areas of the Cavehill Road known as "Little America", although there has been more co-operation between community groups aimed at decreasing tensions.

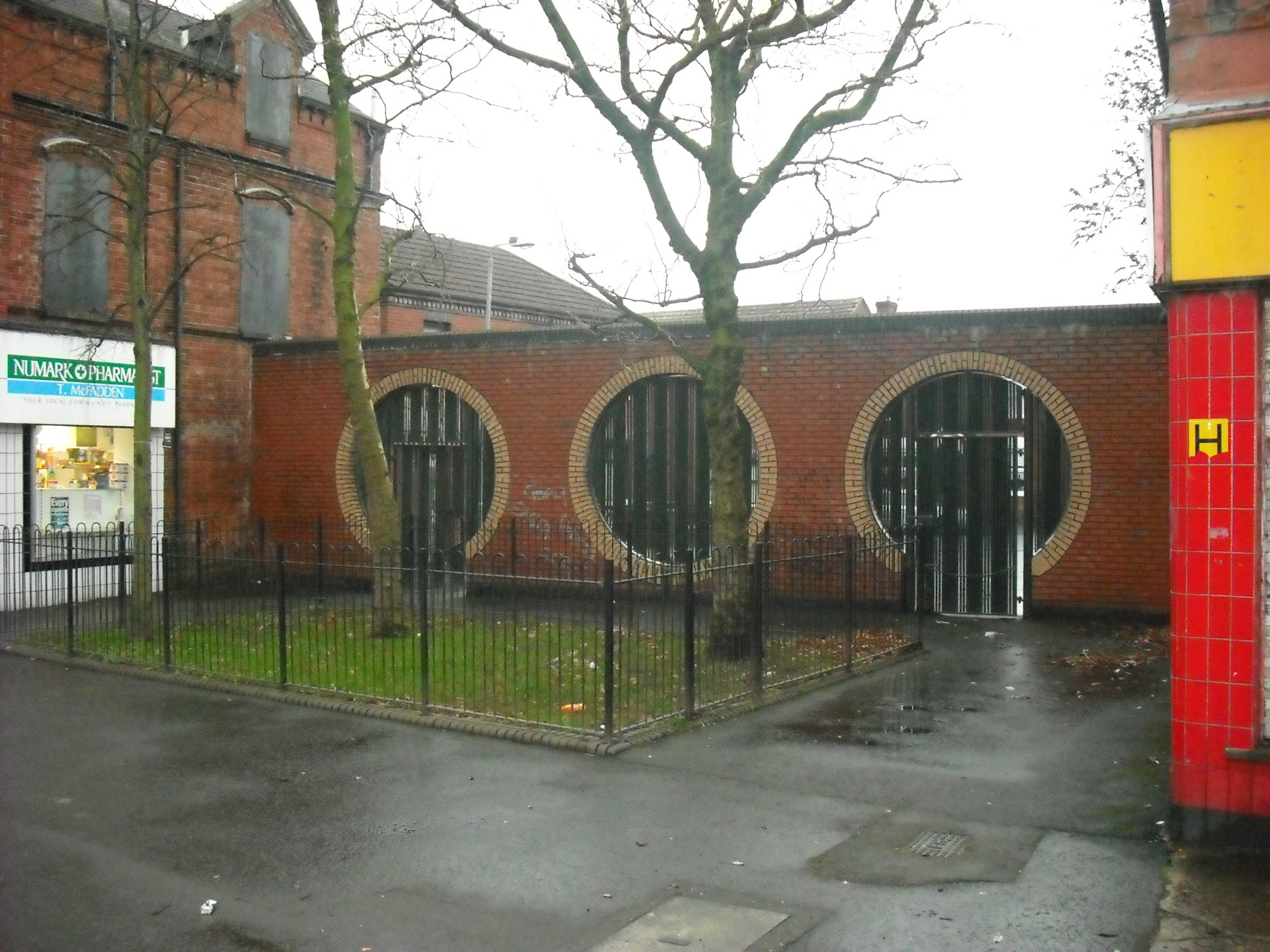
Entrance on Duncairn Gardens to the Catholic section of Halliday's Road

Further north another major flashpoint exists between the republican Ardoyne area and the loyalist Glenbryn estate, with this clash reaching its apex in the above mentioned Holy Cross dispute of 2001 and 2002. The dividing line between the two areas is Alliance Avenue where the peace line has been since 1971. On its western edge Ardoyne borders on the Crumlin Road and Woodvale Road, two mainly loyalist areas.

To the south of Ardoyne there are a number of interface areas on the Oldpark Road. The Torrens area was a heavily fortified loyalist enclave on the road access onto which is severely restricted. Areas such as Wyndham Street and Oldpark Avenue that surround Torrens are mostly republican. During the summer of 1996 the Ulster Volunteer Force in Torrens had been preparing to attack Ardoyne after local disturbances, although they were talked out of it by Progressive Unionist Party politician Billy Hutchinson. Around 2010, the majority of the loyalist population was moved from the area and the barricades and police station have since been demolished. Further down the road the loyalist Lower Oldpark is divided from the republican Ardoyne by the area around Hillview Road and Rosapenna Street, with Manor Street split in half by a peace line. The Lower Oldpark area sees occasional sectarian clashes as a result.

Towards Newtownabbey the Whitewell Road contains an interface area between the republican Whitewell and loyalist White City areas. The Whitewell area, as well as neighbouring Catholic areas of Longlands and Arthur, also border on the loyalist Rathcoole estate.

=== South Belfast ===
Although not strictly an interface as the areas on each side of it are majority Catholic according to the 2001 and 2011 censuses, Ormeau Bridge became the focus of clashes in the 1990s. Residents of the Lower Ormeau Road opposed the Orange Order marching towards the city centre across Ormeau Bridge and via the Lower Ormeau Road. The marches originated in Ballynafeigh, which although a mixed area, contains an Orange Hall and a couple of Protestant enclaves, leading to a tradition of marches along the Ormeau Road. The Parades Commission has determined that marches be prevented from crossing Ormeau Bridge in recent years, and tensions have since reduced.

=== West Belfast ===
One of the deadliest interface areas in Northern Ireland was that between the loyalist Shankill Road and the republican Falls and Springfield roads. Reports of rioting between the two communities go back to at least the 19th century and in the post-war years violence between the young people from both sides was common on the many streets that linked the two areas. Following the outbreak of the Troubles and a huge upturn in violence in these areas most of the direct points of access were sealed by peace lines, generating pockets of urban voids marked by dereliction and abandonment. Low level violence and vandalism often occur at the points where the two areas come very close, notably where Ainsworth Avenue backs onto the Springfield Road, the points at which Kirk Street and Workman Avenue in the Woodvale area touch Springfield, the parts of the Highfield estate that border the Springfield Road and where republican Bombay Street and loyalist Cupar Way almost meet. More recently, on 7 April 2021, the gate at Lanark Way, a road connecting the Springfield Road to the Shankill Road, was the site of rioting in protest against the ‘Northern Ireland Protocol’ of the UK Brexit withdrawal agreement.

Other interfaces in west Belfast include the Donegall Road and Broadway, which are divided between the loyalist Village area and the republican St James's area by the roundabout where the Rise statue stands and the Stewartstown Road that divides the republican Lenadoon area from the loyalist Suffolk.

=== East Belfast ===
Although east Belfast as a whole is largely Protestant in nature the republican enclave of the Short Strand forms a number of interface areas with neighbouring loyalist districts on the Albertbridge Road and the Newtownards Road. The 1970 Battle of St Matthew's saw one of the deadliest expressions of the tensions in the area, although as recently as 2011 sustained violent clashes have broken out in the area.

=== Portadown ===
The interface between the loyalist Corcrain Road and republican Obins Drive has been a regular scene of violence in the County Armagh town. Violence broke out here in 2011 after loyalist youths had liaised with each other through social network sites in order to launch the disturbances.

=== Derry ===
One of the main interface areas is between the Fountain estate and Bishop Street in the cityside as well as several others including the Dungiven Road, Currynierin and Tullyally interface and Irish Street and Gobnascale in the Waterside. In the early years of The Troubles, the Fountain estate almost directly bordered Bishop Street, which was a part of Free Derry, a Republican no-go area, resulting in hardline loyalism and the government trying to intervene by making more interface areas. After Operation Motorman and the end of Free Derry, sectarian violence became worse and the peace lines grew rapidly in the Protestant Fountain area bordering the Catholic Bishop Street. The heavily Protestant Waterside area borders the Catholic Dungiven road and it has multiple peace lines, and has been known as a violent area during The Troubles. There were many other interface areas in Derry but the two mentioned above were the largest. The City Council has attempted to tackle the tensions in these areas by embarking on a Shared City Project that aims to bring together people from both communities through education and recreational activities. Harding Street in the city is divided by a fence.
