= 2002 Short Strand clashes =

Riots in East Belfast, Northern Ireland

- Date: 31 May–7 June 2002
- Location: East Belfast, Northern Ireland
- Methods: Rioting; fighting; houses damaged; gun battles
- Result: Five civilians shot; At least 28 PSNI officers hurt; Damage to cars and property; Families forced out of homes; High tensions

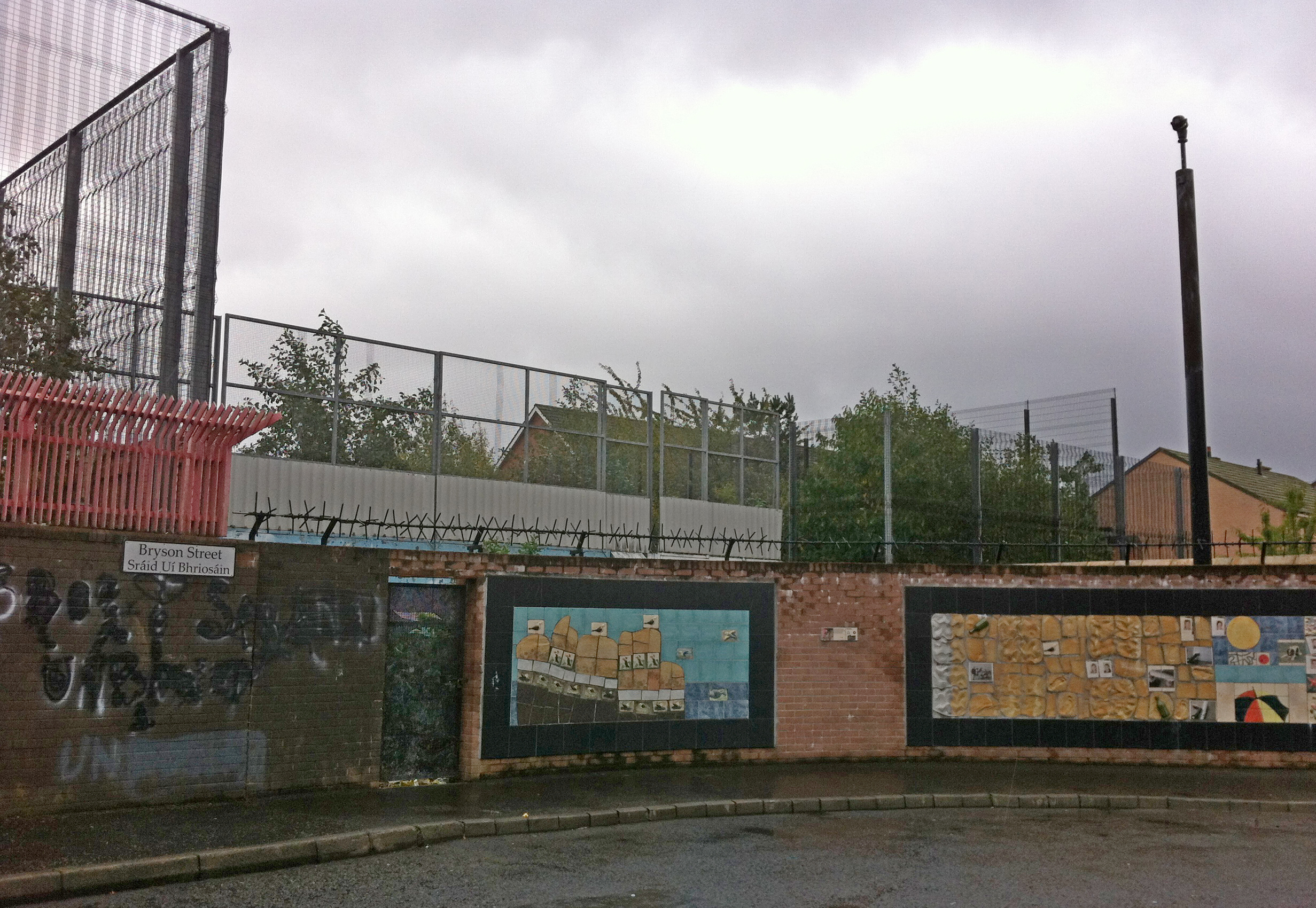
A peace wall in Short Strand dividing it from a Protestant area

The 2002 Short Strand clashes, also known as the siege of Short Strand, was a series of major sectarian violence and gun battles in and around the Short Strand area of east Belfast – a mainly Irish/Catholic enclave surrounded by Protestant communities. Although violence had occurred many times throughout 2002, this article deals with the worst episode in June.

== Clashes ==
The violence started as loyalists were celebrating the Golden Jubilee of Queen Elizabeth II on the streets around Newtownards Road. On Friday 31 May 2002, Protestants were accused of draping unionist red-white-blue buntings on the rails of St Matthew's church in Short Strand. That evening a blast bomb was thrown at a police Land Rover car, injuring nine officers. Soldiers from three British Army regiments were called in to support the Police Service of Northern Ireland (PSNI). On Sunday 2 June, fire bombs were thrown at police, before three Protestants were injured in Cluan Place, a Protestant enclave separated from Short Strand by a peace wall, as loyalists and Irish republicans clashed. Two hours later a Catholic bus driver was wounded when he was attacked by gunmen on Lower Newtownards Road.

On Monday 3 June, up to 1,000 people were involved in street fighting and rioting in Short Strand and around Albertbridge Road. Five people were shot that day and nineteen police officers were wounded. Assistant chief constable of the PSNI claimed that paramilitaries were involved in the violence. Police constable Colin Cramphorne warned that Northern Ireland was heading for "a fresh nightmare". Both loyalists and republicans blamed each other, whilst the PSNI acknowledged that both the Ulster Volunteer Force (UVF) and the Provisional Irish Republican Army (IRA) were orchestrating violence. In Cluan Place three civilians were shot. During the fighting houses were set on fire by petrol bombs, forcing many families out.

David Ervine, leader of the Progressive Unionist Party (PUP) said that Short Strand had become a "no-go area" for security forces. Both Ervine and Sinn Féin leader Gerry Adams held emergency talks with Northern Ireland secretary John Reid. A councillor of Short Strand claimed that loyalist paramilitaries fired into the Catholic area first.

Fresh violence broke out on Wednesday. Saint Matthew's church was attacked with bottles and stones, before a stand-off of loyalists with security forces on Lower Newtownards Road in the afternoon. By night time, shots were fired in Short Strand, narrowly missing a group of children and a 22-year-old woman inside her living room in Seaforde Street. Earlier that day, the local Sinn Féin councillor, Joe O'Donnell, blamed loyalists for the shootings. First Minister David Trimble meanwhile blamed the IRA for organising the violence, having told British Prime Minister Tony Blair so in a meeting.

On Thursday 6 June, loyalist women blocked Lower Newtownards Road in a protest. One of their posters read "No Short Strand nationalists or republicans allowed into east Belfast". One of the women said:

"These Fenians in the Short Strand want to take over the houses in Cluan Place. We don't want them shopping on our road anymore. We want the police to go in there and restore order. Our kids musn't go through what we had to endure in the 1970s."

On Friday, masked loyalist men raided the Belfast Institute for Further and Higher Education, a few blocks from the scene of the clashes. They checked identifications of students to see who was from Short Strand, and warned them not to enter the area. Councillor Joe O'Donnell said that day:

"The people here are cut off from medical facilities, shops and now from places of education. We are trying to set up emergency supplies but the surrounding loyalist areas are trying to strangle us."

By the weekend, residents were returning to their homes on both sides as the situation became relatively calm.

== Aftermath ==
Northern Ireland security minister Jane Kennedy called the violence "mindless" and urged both sides to stop. SDLP leader Mark Durkan also condemned the violence and blamed loyalist paramilitaries of exploiting the situation. The violence was compared to the riots of 1969.

On 8 June, Kennedy announced that the peace lines will be raised and high metal screens erected to prevent gunmen from firing over the walls, including between Cluan Place and Clandeboye Drive, the main flashpoint of the clashes. However a previous wall extension on Madrid Street led to Short Strand residents claiming they were cut off from shops living in a "state of siege".

The BBC called the east Belfast clashes as one of the worst instances of street violence in Belfast "in a generation". In the years after the clashes, community workers on both sides of the communities formally met regularly in en effort to reduce tensions.

Sporadic clashes would continue in east Belfast. On 22 August rioting by a loyalist mob injured nine police officers, which was blamed on the Ulster Defence Association (UDA).

== See also ==
- Battle of St Matthew's
- Holy Cross dispute
- Drumcree conflict
- July 2001 Belfast riots
- May 2002 Belfast riots
- 2005 Belfast riots
