= May 2002 Belfast riots =

Riots in Northern Ireland

The May 2002 Belfast riots were riots that occurred in north Belfast, Northern Ireland. On Saturday May 2002, up to 800 people were involved in sectarian clashes beginning shortly after the Scottish Cup Final in which Rangers F.C. beat Celtic F.C. Petrol bombs and fireworks were thrown at Police Service of Northern Ireland (PSNI) officers. That night 28 police officers and 10 civilians were injured, including two Protestant men who were shot.

The PSNI fired 40 plastic baton rounds at rioters, which happened in and around Ardoyne, Crumlin Road and New Lodge. Two officers had serious injuries, one with a suspected fractured skull and another being treated for spinal injuries. Several homes around Whitewell Road came under attack. Both sides blamed each other for starting the violence. DUP MP Nigel Dodds and Progressive Unionist Party Assembly member Billy Hutchinson blamed republicans for starting the trouble, while a Sinn Féin councillor said the trouble began when 12 loyalists attacked nationalist homes with iron bars, and blamed the Ulster Defence Association (UDA) for orchestrating it. Another Sinn Fein councillor said the trouble began when loyalists threw bricks and bottles.

On a second night of violence, pipe bombs were thrown at police and three officers were injured in the middle of confrontations between loyalists and nationalists. A loyalist community worker said that the violence was a consequence of the shooting of two Protestants the night before.

North Belfast had already seen tensions and violence up to that point in the year, including in both March and April 2002, the latter of which involved a bomb explosion.

== See also ==
- July 2001 Belfast riots
- Holy Cross dispute
- November 2001 Belfast riots
- 2002 Short Strand clashes
- 2005 Belfast riots
- 2010 Northern Ireland riots
