= Alexandra Park, Belfast =

Park in Belfast, Northern Ireland

Coordinates: 54.618°N 5.932°W

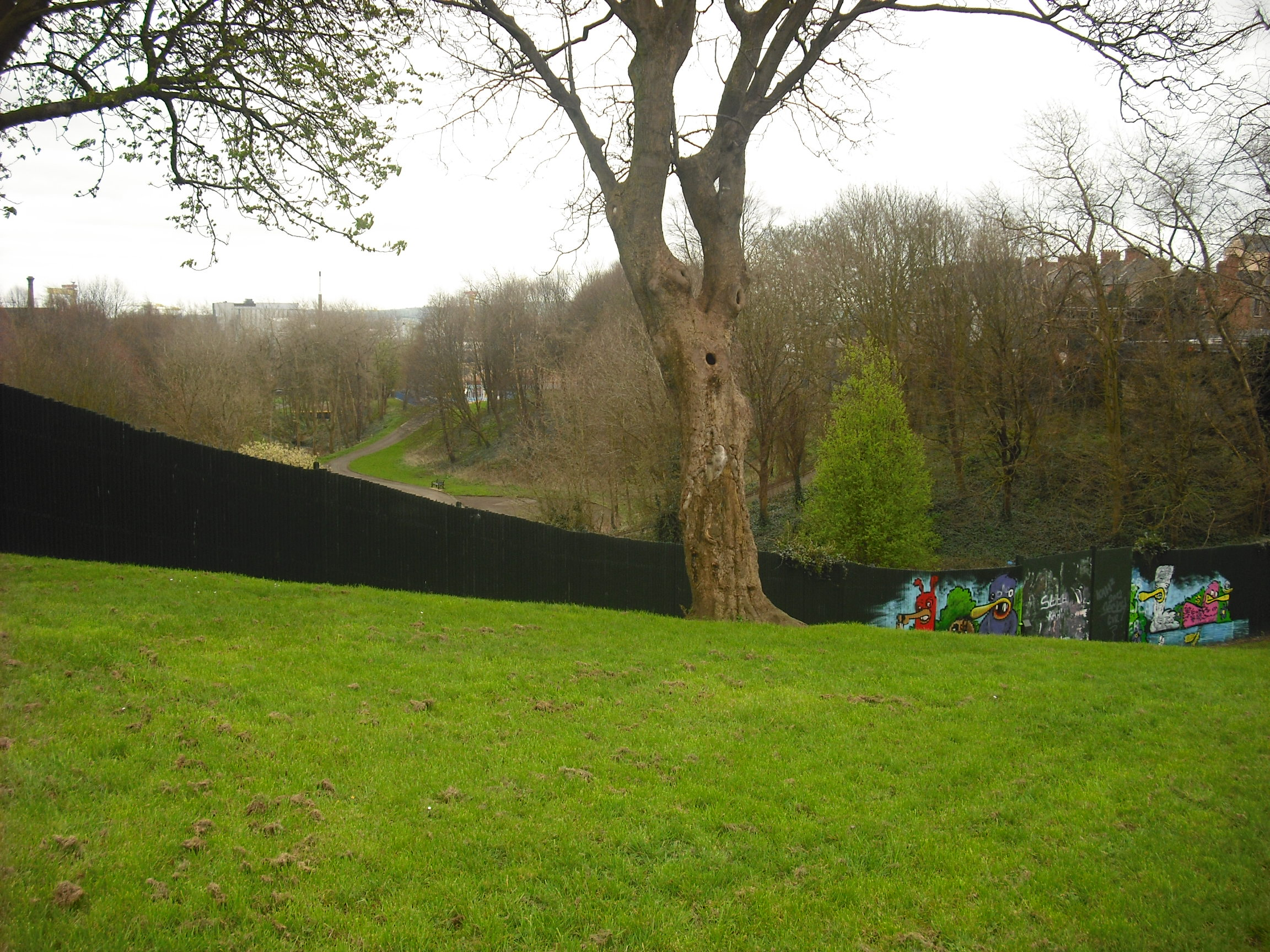
Alexandra Park fence, viewed from the Antrim Road side

Alexandra Park is a Victorian park situated in north Belfast. It is named after Princess Alexandra of Saxe-Coburg and Gotha and was opened in 1888. As is typical for parks of the period, it has a formal layout that includes tree lined avenues. It also contains play areas for children.

Alexandra Park is believed to be the only park in western Europe to be divided by a three-metre (10') wall. The barrier was erected in 1994 and is one of a number of "peace walls" built across the city in attempt to prevent violence between Nationalist/Republican and Unionist/Loyalist communities. The wall's foundations were laid on 1 September 1994, the day of the first IRA ceasefire. The northern part of the park was accessible only from the Antrim Road whilst the southern part could only be reached from the Shore Road. In September 2011 a gate linking the two communities was installed in the wall. The gate was initially open on weekdays from 9 am to 3 pm for a trial period of 3 months. As of 2026 the gate is now open full time.
