= Whitewell Road =

Street in Belfast, Northern Ireland

Coordinates: 54.654°N 5.930°W

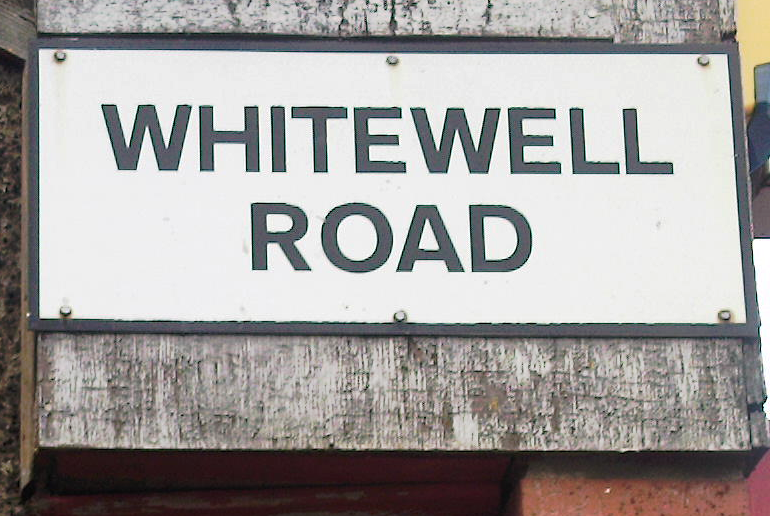
Road sign at Shore Road end

The Whitewell Road is an interface area in north Belfast and Newtownabbey, Northern Ireland, and historically the site of occasional clashes between nationalists and loyalists. The Whitewell Road and the surrounding area is a residential community in the Greencastle parish. The Whitewell area is considered a working class area. For much of its length the Whitewell Road runs parallel to the M2 and also provides a direct link between the A2 (Shore Road) and the A6 (Antrim Road). In total it is roughly 2.44 kilometres (1.52 miles) long.

The beginning of the White City residential estate on the upper Whitewell Road marks the boundary between the Nationalist and Loyalist communities there. A peace line runs the length of Serpentine Gardens. The road generally had a high level of community integration until 1997 when the Drumcree conflict polarised the two communities in the area and led to increased tension, violence and segregation. In 2012, as part of an effort to tackle sectarian divisions, the Catholic-run Greencastle CEP and the Protestant-run Whitecity Community Development Association merged to form the Greater Whitewell Community Surgery as single community organisation for all residents of the road and its surrounding districts.

Hazelwood Integrated College is located on the Whitewell Road. It is an integrated comprehensive secondary school, drawing students from various religious and community backgrounds throughout the greater Belfast area.

Half way up the road is the Throne Centre, a mixed-use business premises that has had a number of uses over the years. Taking its name from the Giant's Chair, a large stone on nearby Cavehill used as the throne of the O'Neill Clan, it was initially a private residence before becoming a hospital and convalescent home. Whilst used as a hospital Throne became noted for its pioneering work in the area of plastic surgery.

== Politics ==
Most of the Whitewell Road lies within the Castle District Electoral Area of Belfast City Council. The current representatives are Lydia Patterson and Guy Spence of the Democratic Unionist Party, Mary Campbell and Tierna Cunningham of Sinn Féin and Pat Convery of the Social Democratic and Labour Party. The road is in Belfast North for parliamentary election and the same constituency for the Northern Ireland Assembly. The Member of Parliament (MP) is the John Finucane of Sinn Féin, and the MLAs are Paula Bradley, William Humphrey and Nelson McCausland of the DUP, Carál Ní Chuilín and Gerry Kelly of Sinn Féin and Alban Maginness of the SDLP.
