= Short Strand =

Area in Belfast, Northern Ireland

Coordinates: 54.59805°N 5.90936°W

The Short Strand (Irish: an Trá Ghearr) is a working class, inner city area of Belfast, Northern Ireland. It is a mainly Catholic and Irish nationalist enclave surrounded by the mainly Protestant and unionist East Belfast.

Short Strand is located on the east bank of the River Lagan in the townland of Ballymacarrett, which is part of County Down. The borders of the Short Strand are Albertbridge Road (to the south), Short Strand Road (to the west), Newtownards Road (to the north) and Bryson Street/Clandeboye Gardens (to the east). At the Short Strand's northeast corner is St Matthew's Catholic church.

For decades, Protestants and Catholics have regularly clashed at the edges of the Short Strand. This has led to fierce rioting and, occasionally, gun battles. Much of the Short Strand is surrounded by peace lines.

== History ==
=== 18th century ===
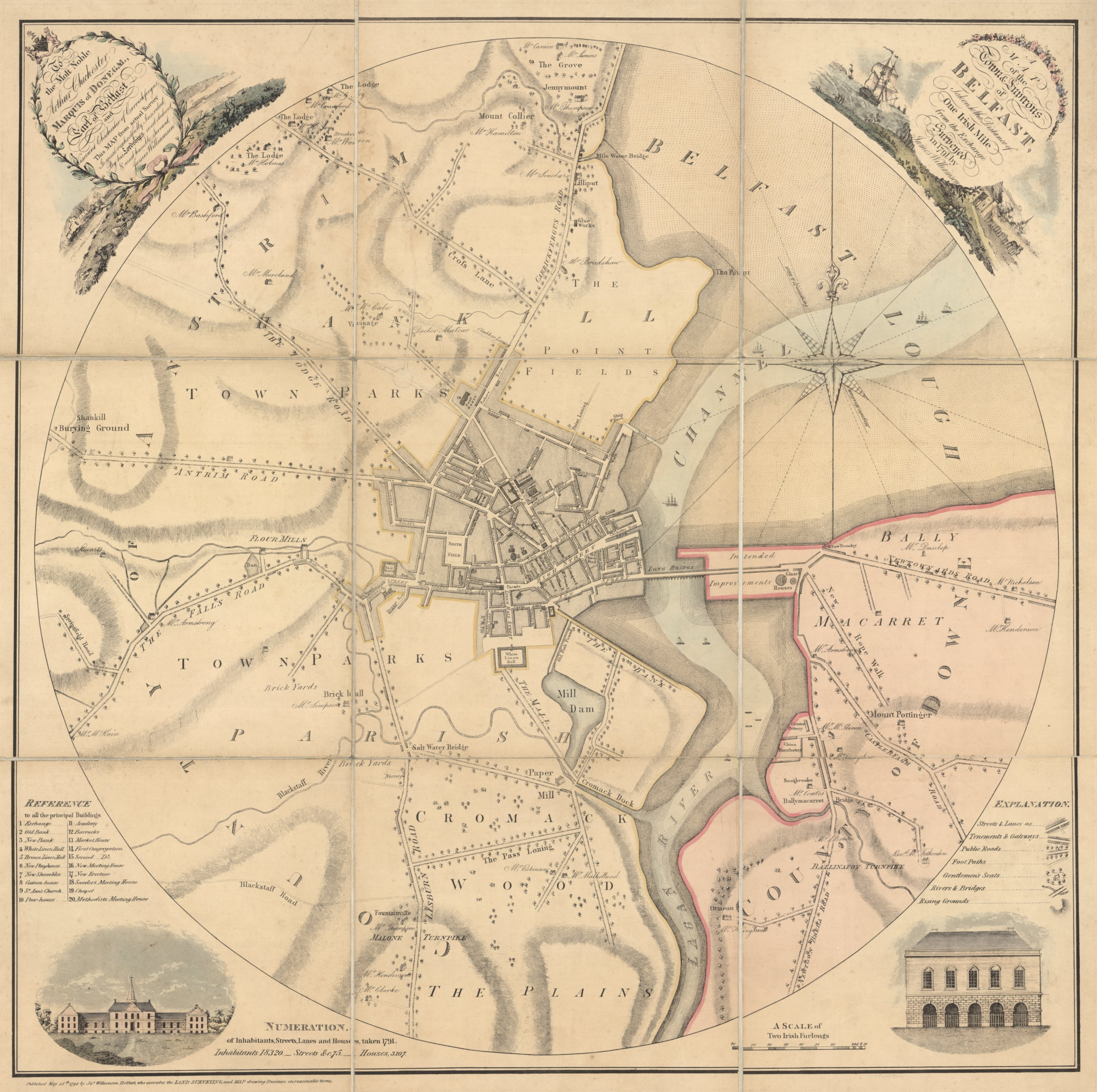
Map of the river shore at Short Strand (partially reclaimed, with glassworks) south of Long Bridge in 1791. The red shoreline shows the boundary of County Down.

The name 'short strand' refers to the previous river shoreline of Ballymacarrett townland, before the land to the west was reclaimed in stages from the River Lagan for industrial use in the 18th century. This included the first glassworks in the area, established by Benjamin Edwards in 1776, which also used sand from the river to make its glass.

=== 19th century ===
In the 19th century, many Catholics moved from County Down to the area.

=== 1920s Troubles ===
On 21 July 1920, after hours of intimidation and violence by Loyalists, most Catholic and Socialist workers were forcibly removed from their jobs at the Harland and Wolff shipyard. Expulsions continued for several days at locations within Belfast to include several hundred female textile workers. After the "Shipyard Clearances" intense Communal violence occurred in the Short Strand area for several years with an estimated 32 people from the area losing their lives over a two year period. Widespread rioting, looting, evictions of Catholics from their homes and arson occurred. The local Catholic church (St. Matthews) was attacked multiple times – on 25 August 1920 after lootings and arson attacks in Ballymacarrett, on 22 November 1921 the gate lodge of the church was gutted by a Loyalist mob numbering between seven and eight hundred. In March 1922, St. Mathews Primary School was subjected to a bombing attack. (See Belfast Pogrom.)

=== The Troubles ===
The ethno-political conflict known as The Troubles began in 1969. In the early years of the Troubles, Catholics in Short Strand numbered about 6,000, while their Protestant neighbours totalled about 60,000. The area was the scene of much violence; including rioting and attacks by both Irish republican and loyalist paramilitaries. On 27 June 1970, the Provisional IRA fought a lengthy gun battle with loyalist militants around St Matthew's church. Three people were killed. This was the Provisional IRA's first major action and became known as the Battle of St Matthew's.

Throughout the Troubles there was a Royal Ulster Constabulary (RUC) base in the Short Strand. It was heavily fortified due to bomb and gun attacks by the IRA. It was shut in 2009 and demolished in February 2011.

=== 21st century ===
An entrance to Short Strand

In June 2002, there was major rioting between rival republican and loyalist crowds, numbering over 1,000, and prolonged exchanges of gunfire between the rival paramilitaries. See 2002 Short Strand clashes.

On 20 June 2011, a group of 60 to 100 men were reported to be attacking peoples' homes. There were reports of injuries, as well as homes being damaged and petrol bombs being thrown. Two men were reported to have been shot. Fighting had started at an interface area between Mountpottinger Road and the lower Newtownards road. Chief Superintendent Alan McCrum of the PSNI said that the violence had been orchestrated by the UVF. Two men were shot, and eleven shots were fired. A press photographer was shot on the second night of riots, with the PSNI blaming dissident Republicans. Assistant Chief Constable Alastair Finlay said that there was no sign that the UVF intended to finish the rioting.

In 2015, the area again made headlines when members of the IRA were blamed for the murder of former IRA man Kevin McGuigan, who was shot dead outside his home in the Short Strand in retaliation for the murder three months earlier of senior IRA member Gerard 'Jock' Davison.

== Popular culture ==
=== Film ===
- Much of the film The Outsider (1980) is set in the Short Strand.

=== Television ===
- The Short Strand, and St Matthew's Church in particular, are settings for season 3 of the television show Sons of Anarchy.
