= Segregation in Northern Ireland =

Sociopolitical division between Irish republicans and unionists

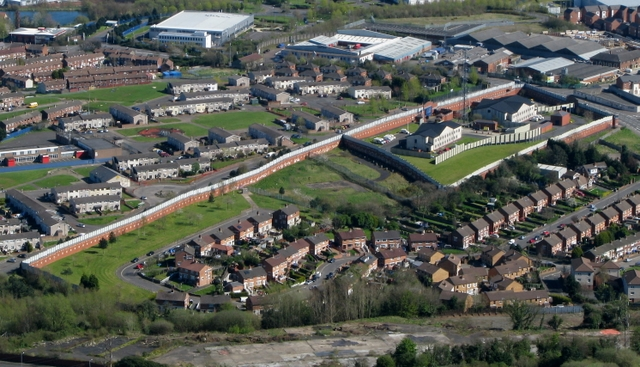
A 5.5 metres (18 ft) high "peace line" along Springmartin Road in Belfast, with a fortified police station at one end

Religion map of Belfast, 2011, showing percentage of respondents identifying as Catholic in each area.

Segregation in Northern Ireland is a long-running issue in the political and social history of Northern Ireland. The religious segregation involves Northern Ireland's two main voting blocs—Irish nationalist/republicans (mainly Roman Catholic) and unionist/loyalist (mainly Protestant). It is often seen as both a cause and effect of the "Troubles".

A combination of political, religious and social differences plus the threat of intercommunal tensions and violence has led to widespread self-segregation of the two communities. Catholics and Protestants lead largely separate lives in a situation that some have dubbed "self-imposed apartheid".

== Education ==
Education in Northern Ireland is heavily segregated. Most state schools in Northern Ireland are predominantly Protestant, while the majority of Catholic children attend schools maintained by the Catholic Church. In 2006, 90% of children in Northern Ireland were in segregated schools, by 2017 that figure had risen to 93%. The consequence is, as one commentator has put it, that "the overwhelming majority of Ulster's children can go from four to 18 without having a serious conversation with a member of a rival creed." The prevalence of segregated education has been cited as a major factor in maintaining endogamy (marriage within one's own group).

The integrated education movement has sought to reverse this trend by establishing non-denominational schools. Such schools are, however, still the exception to the general trend of segregated education. Integrated schools in Northern Ireland have been established through the voluntary efforts of parents. The churches have not been involved in the development of integrated education. However, both the Catholic Church and Protestant denominations, along with state-run institutions, have supported and organised cross-community school projects such as joint field trips, educational classes and forums wherein pupils can come together to share their beliefs, values and cultures. The academic John H. Whyte argued that "the two factors which do most to divide Protestants as a whole from Catholics as a whole are endogamy and separate education".

== Employment ==
Historically, employment in the Northern Irish economy was highly segregated in favour of Protestants, particularly at senior levels of the public sector, in certain then-important sectors of the economy, such as shipbuilding and heavy engineering, and strategically important areas such as the police. Emigration to seek employment was therefore significantly more prevalent among the Catholic population. As a result, Northern Ireland's demography shifted further in favour of Protestants leaving their ascendancy seemingly impregnable by the late 1950s.

A 1987 survey found that 80 per cent of the work forces surveyed were described by respondents as consisting of a majority of one denomination; 20 per cent were overwhelmingly uni-denominational, with 95–100 per cent Catholic or Protestant employees. However, large organisations were much less likely to be segregated, and the level of segregation has decreased over the years.

The British government has introduced numerous laws and regulations since the mid-1990s to prohibit discrimination on religious grounds, with the Fair Employment Commission (originally the Fair Employment Agency) exercising statutory powers to investigate allegations of discriminatory practices in Northern Ireland business and organisations. This has had a significant impact on the level of segregation in the workplace; John Whyte concludes that the result is that "segregation at work is one of the least acute forms of segregation in Northern Ireland."

== Housing ==
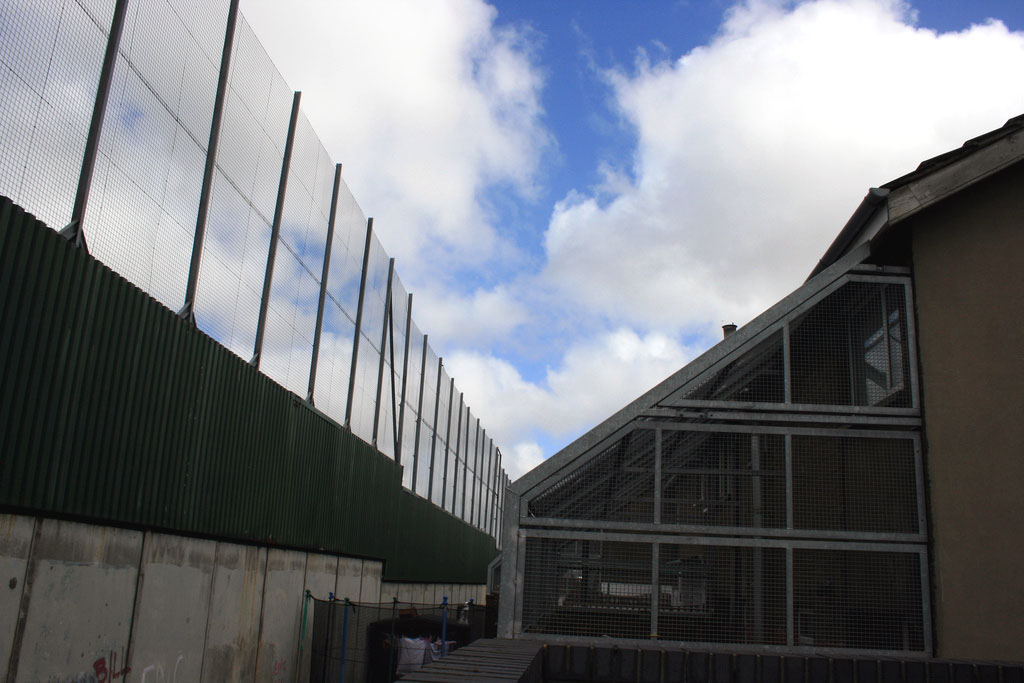
Back of a house behind a "peace line", on Bombay Street, Belfast

Public housing is overwhelmingly segregated between the two communities. Inter-communal tensions have forced substantial numbers of people to move from mixed areas into areas inhabited exclusively by one denomination, thus increasing the degree of polarisation and segregation. The extent of self-segregation grew very rapidly with the outbreak of the Troubles. In 1969, 69 per cent of Protestants and 56 per cent of Catholics lived in streets where they were in their own majority; as the result of large-scale flight from mixed areas between 1969 and 1971 following outbreaks of violence, the respective proportions had by 1972 increased to 99 per cent of Protestants and 75 per cent of Catholics. In Belfast, the 1970s were a time of rising residential segregation. It was estimated in 2004 that 92.5% of public housing in Northern Ireland was divided along religious lines, with the figure rising to 98% in Belfast. Self-segregation is a continuing process, despite the Northern Ireland peace process. It was estimated in 2005 that more than 1,400 people a year were being forced to move as a consequence of intimidation.

In response to inter-communal violence, authorities in Northern Ireland constructed a number of high walls called "peace lines" to separate rival neighbourhoods. These have multiplied over the years and now number forty separate barriers, mostly located in Belfast. Despite the moves towards peace between Northern Ireland's political parties and most of its paramilitary groups, the construction of "peace lines" has actually increased during the ongoing peace process; the number of "peace lines" doubled in the ten years between 1995 and 2005. In 2008 a process was proposed for the removal of the peace walls.

The effective segregation of the two communities significantly affects the usage of local services in "interface areas" where sectarian neighbourhoods adjoin. Surveys in 2005 of 9,000 residents of interface areas found that 75% refused to use the closest facilities because of location, while 82% routinely travelled to "safer" areas to access facilities even if the journey time was longer. 60% refused to shop in areas dominated by the other community, with many fearing ostracism by their own community if they violated an unofficial de facto boycott of their sectarian opposites.

== Intermarriage ==
In contrast with both the Republic of Ireland and most parts of Great Britain, where intermarriage between Protestants and Catholics is not unusual, in Northern Ireland it has been uncommon: from 1970 through to the 1990s, only 5 per cent of marriages were recorded as crossing community divides. This figure remained largely constant throughout the Troubles. It rose to between 8 and 12 per cent, according to the Northern Ireland Life and Times Survey, in 2003, 2004 and 2005. Attitudes towards Catholic–Protestant intermarriage have become more supportive in recent years (particularly among the middle class) and younger people are also more likely to be married to someone of a different religion to themselves than older people. However, the data does not show the considerable regional variation across Northern Ireland.

== Anti-discrimination legislation ==
In the 1970s, the British government took action to legislate against religious discrimination in Northern Ireland. The Fair Employment Act 1976 prohibited discrimination in the workplace on the grounds of religion and established a Fair Employment Agency. This Act was strengthened with a new Fair Employment Act in 1989, which introduced a duty on employers to monitor the religious composition of their workforce, and created the Fair Employment Commission to replace the Fair Employment Agency. The law was extended to cover the provision of goods, facilities and services in 1998 under the Fair Employment and Treatment (Northern Ireland) Order 1998. In 1999, the commission was merged with the Equal Opportunities Commission, the Commission for Racial Equality and the Northern Ireland Disability Council to become part of the Equality Commission for Northern Ireland.

An Equality Commission review in 2004 of the operation of the anti-discrimination legislation since the 1970s, found that there had been a substantial improvement in the employment profile of Catholics, most marked in the public sector but not confined to it. It said that Catholics were now well represented in managerial, professional and senior administrative posts, although there were some areas of under-representation such as local government and security but that the overall picture was a positive one. Catholics, however, were still more likely than Protestants to be unemployed and there were emerging areas of Protestant under-representation in the public sector, most notably in health and education at many levels including professional and managerial. The report also found that there had been a considerable increase in the numbers of people who work in integrated workplaces.
