= Battle of St Matthew's =

1970 gun battle in Northern Ireland

- Part of the Troubles
Date	27–28 June 1970
Location	Short Strand, Belfast, Northern Ireland 54°35′57″N 5°54′22″W
Result	IRA victory

Belligerents
Provisional IRA; Belfast Brigade; Citizens' Defence Committee	Ulster loyalists

Commanders and leaders
Billy McKee	Unknown

Strength
1 active service unit (about a dozen IRA volunteers)	Unknown number of gunmen, and rioters

Casualties and losses
1 killed 1+ wounded	2 killed Unknown wounded
- The location of the battle (red dot) in Belfast (pink)

The Battle of St Matthew's or Battle of Short Strand was a gun battle that took place on the night of 27–28 June 1970 in Belfast, Northern Ireland. It was fought between the Provisional Irish Republican Army (IRA), and Ulster loyalists in the area around St Matthew's Roman Catholic church. This lies at the edge of the Short Strand, a Catholic enclave in a mainly-Protestant part of the city. Violence had erupted there, and in other parts of Belfast, following marches by the Orange Order. The battle lasted about five hours and ended at dawn when loyalists withdrew. The British Army and police were deployed nearby but did not intervene. Three people were killed and at least 26 wounded in the fighting, while another three were killed in north Belfast.

The battle was the Provisional IRA's first major action during the Troubles, and a propaganda victory for the Irish nationalist organization. It presented itself as having successfully defended a vulnerable Catholic enclave from armed loyalist mobs. Loyalists, however, argue that the IRA lured them into a carefully prepared trap.

== Background ==
During the Northern Ireland riots of August 1969 in Belfast, Catholic Irish republicans clashed with Protestant Ulster loyalists and the mainly-Protestant Royal Ulster Constabulary (RUC), Northern Ireland's police force. Catholics believed that they were about to become "victims of a Protestant pogrom" and Protestants believed they were on the "eve of an IRA insurrection". Hundreds of Catholic homes and businesses were burnt out and more than 1,000 families, mostly Catholic, were forced to flee. The Irish Republican Army (IRA) had few weapons or members and was unable to adequately defend the Catholic areas. The rioting ended with the deployment of British troops. In December 1969, the IRA split into the 'Official' IRA and 'Provisional' IRA—with the Provisionals vowing to defend Catholic areas in future.

The Short Strand is a Catholic/nationalist enclave in East Belfast, a mainly Protestant/Ulster unionist part of the city. In the early years of the Troubles, Catholics in Short Strand numbered about 6,000, while their Protestant neighbours totalled about 60,000.

=== Preceding violence ===
On Saturday 27 June 1970, a large march by the Orange Order took place in west Belfast, which was joined by loyalist bands from other parts of the city. Violence broke out as the march entered the Catholic Springfield Road area on its way to Whiterock Orange Hall. Missiles were thrown by both sides, a bakery was set ablaze, and the British Army fired CS gas to disperse crowds. The riot sparked violence in other parts of Belfast.

In north Belfast, another Orange march went along the Crumlin Road, the boundary between the Catholic Ardoyne and the Protestant Shankill areas. According to Crown prosecutors, a crowd emerged from Ardoyne throwing bottles and stones. As the riot descended into a gun battle, the IRA—who according to Gerry Adams were "ready and waiting"—killed three Protestants: William Kincaid (28), Daniel Loughins (32) and Alexander Gould (18). Others were wounded, including a Royal Navy petty officer who was shot in the jaw while driving a field ambulance. Earlier in the month, British troops had diverted an Orange march away from Ardoyne, leading to serious rioting by Protestants in the Shankill.

In the predominantly Protestant east of the city, an Orange parade had also taken place along the Newtownards Road. At the bottom of the road is the Catholic enclave of the Short Strand, and here there would be a gun battle between the IRA and Protestants, though the cause of it was disputed by both sides.

== Battle ==
Violence erupted at St Matthew's Catholic church on the evening of 27 June. It began after a loyalist band and supporters marched through the area on their return from the main parade. Rival groups gathered, taunting led to stone-throwing, and eventually, shots were fired.

As the situation worsened, Catholic residents feared that the gathering crowds of loyalists would attempt to invade the Short Strand and burn them from their homes. Local IRA members retrieved weapons from arms dumps. A young resident, Jim Gibney, recalled: "I saw neighbours, people I knew, coming down the street carrying rifles. I was just dumbstruck by this experience. I'd never seen such a thing before".

The battle began at about 10 pm and would continue for the next five hours. Loyalists began attacking the church and surrounding property with petrol bombs. A small house in the church grounds, where the sexton lived with his family, was set ablaze. A nearby Catholic pub was also looted and burnt.

A small group of IRA members and members of the Citizens' Defence Committee took up positions in the church grounds and in adjoining streets. The IRA members were armed with M1 carbines and were led by Billy McKee, commander of the IRA's Belfast Brigade. Also present was Billy Kelly, commander of the Belfast Brigade's 3rd Battalion. The IRA members fired at the loyalists, some of whom were positioned on the roofs opposite. Jim Magee, a local loyalist, said he saw wounded people lying on the road and asked the police (RUC) for help. According to Magee, "[they] said 'if you have anything, get it out and protect your people'. So we got an old rifle and went into Frazer Street and started firing back".

The security forces were deployed in the area at the time but did not intervene to end the fighting. Shortly after the shooting began, Stormont MP Paddy Kennedy went with Short Strand residents to the local RUC base and demanded protection for their homes. Across the River Lagan, in the Markets area, other IRA members assembled and prepared to reinforce the Short Strand should it be invaded. British soldiers eventually arrived in armoured vehicles and cordoned off the roads around the Short Strand, which denied the IRA "any hope of reinforcement". At the time, the British Army said that its soldiers fired no shots because "owing to the confused situation, it was impossible to identify targets". British Army Colonel Mike Dewar later said: "The whole incident had taken its course because the Army was so chronically overstretched that night in Belfast. The one spare platoon in the whole of west Belfast was not able to get through rioting Protestants to the Short Strand". Journalist Tony Geraghty wrote that sometimes "The gunfire eased long enough to allow an occasional British Army personnel carrier (a 'Pig') to whine past, illuminated by the flames in a token gesture of law-and-order". Another journalist who witnessed the battle, Peter Taylor, later said:

The shooting intensified but the soldiers still declined to intervene and separate the two sides – either because they felt they were not numerically strong enough or because they did not wish to get caught up in the middle of a sectarian fight, in the darkness, with shots being fired by both sides.

Liz Maskey, who was a volunteer nurse that night, said that the Short Strand was surrounded by loyalists and claimed they attacked her ambulance as it tried to leave the area.

The loyalists withdrew after about five hours, as dawn broke. IRA leader Billy McKee claimed that his unit had fired 800 rounds during the battle.

=== Casualties ===
Three people were killed in the fighting. At least 26 were wounded—including Billy McKee, who was shot five times.

- Robert Neill, a 38-year-old Protestant, died instantly when a shot fired from the church bounced off the pavement and hit him in the spine.
- James McCurrie, a 34-year-old Protestant, was shot dead on Beechfield Street.
- Henry McIlhone, a 33-year-old Catholic, was helping to defend Short Strand when he was accidentally shot from the republican side. He died on 29 June. However, McKee maintains that McIlhone was shot by loyalists. Tírghrá, the IRA's official list of its fallen, lists McIlhone as a "volunteer" but adds "although not a member of the IRA, Henry McIlhone was included in the republican roll of honour as a mark of respect for this great Irishman by republican comrades he fought alongside".

== Aftermath ==
Republicans and loyalists disagree over who started the violence and fired the first shots. Republicans claim that the violence was started by a mob of loyalists returning from an Orange march. They say that the loyalists tried to set the church alight and invade Short Strand, with the intention of burning the residents from their homes. Hence, republicans argue that they were defending the Short Strand from a loyalist attack. Loyalists claim the violence was begun by republicans; allegedly when the returning Orangemen and supporters were attacked on Newtownards Road. They argue that republicans attacked Protestants to lure them into "a carefully prepared trap".

The following day, loyalists expelled 500 Catholic workers from the nearby Harland and Wolff shipyard. Shortly after, the British government's representative at Stormont said that the decision to allow Orange marches to go ahead on that day was "the greatest single miscalculation I have ever seen made in the course of my life".

Many Catholics and nationalists believed that the IRA had been unable to defend them during the August 1969 riots. However, it is argued that the IRA's defence of Short Strand redeemed it in the eyes of many Catholics and nationalists. Prior to the gun battle, the IRA had been waiting for an opportunity to portray themselves as defenders of the Catholic community. Among republicans, the battle is seen as a key event in the growth of the Provisional IRA.

Less than a week later, the British Army seized a large haul of Official IRA weapons during a three-day operation in west Belfast. Nationalists saw this as a confiscation of their defences.

== See also ==
- Timeline of Provisional Irish Republican Army actions
- Timeline of Ulster Volunteer Force actions
- 1997 riots in Northern Ireland
- 2002 Short Strand clashes
- 2011 Northern Ireland riots
