= Holy Cross dispute =

Dispute in Ardoyne, Belfast, Northern Ireland

Coordinates: 54°37′12″N 5°58′08″W

- Date: 19 June 2001 – 11 January 2002
- Location: Ardoyne, Belfast, Northern Ireland
- Methods: Picketing; Rioting; Verbal and physical abuse
- Result: Numerous police and civilians injured; Damage to cars and property; Children suffering from trauma; Tighter security introduced

Parties
Security forces, schoolchildren and parents	Ulster loyalist protesters, including members of Red Hand Defenders (RHD)

Casualties and losses
170+ policemen and several British soldiers injured	

The Holy Cross dispute occurred in 2001 and 2002 in the Ardoyne area of north Belfast, Northern Ireland. During the 30-year conflict known as the Troubles, Ardoyne had become segregated – Ulster Protestants and Irish Catholics lived in separate areas. This left Holy Cross, a Catholic primary school for girls, in the middle of a Protestant area. In June 2001 – during the last week of school before the summer break – Protestant loyalists began picketing the school, claiming that Catholics were regularly attacking their homes and denying them access to facilities.

The picket resumed on 3 September, when the new school term began. For weeks, hundreds of loyalist protesters tried to stop the schoolchildren and their parents from walking to school through their area. Hundreds of riot police, backed up by British soldiers, escorted the children and parents through the protest each day. Some protesters shouted sectarian abuse and threw missiles, including balloons filled with urine, at the schoolchildren and their families. The "scenes of frightened Catholic schoolgirls running a gauntlet of abuse from loyalist protesters as they walked to school captured world headlines". Death threats were made against the parents and school staff by the Red Hand Defenders, a loyalist paramilitary group. The protest was condemned by both Catholics and Protestants, including politicians. Some likened the protest to child abuse and compared the protesters to North American white supremacists in the 1950s. During this time, the protest sparked bouts of fierce rioting between Catholics and Protestants in Ardoyne, and loyalist attacks on police. On 23 November, the loyalists ended the protest after being promised tighter security for their area and a redevelopment scheme. The security forces remained outside the school for several months after.

In January 2002, a scuffle between a Protestant and a Catholic outside the school sparked a large-scale riot in the area and attacks on other schools in north Belfast. The picket was not resumed and the situation has been mostly quiet since then. The following year, the BBC aired a documentary-drama about the protests.

== Beginning ==
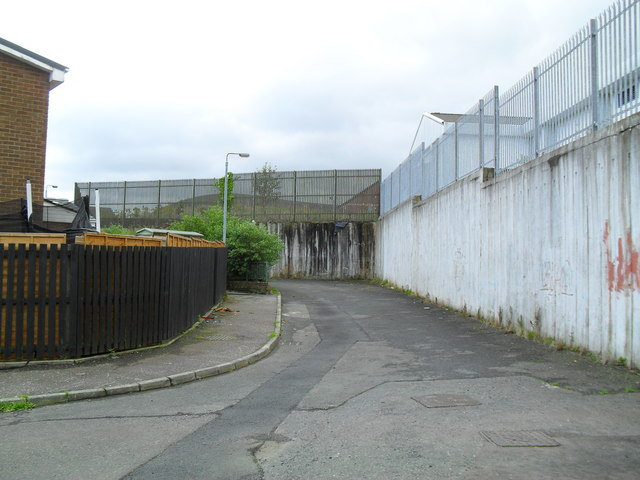
One of the "peace lines" in Ardoyne, segregating Catholic and Protestant neighbourhoods

Holy Cross is a girls-only Catholic primary school in the Ardoyne area of north Belfast. Ardoyne was one of the most deprived areas of Northern Ireland. Before the outbreak of the Troubles in the late 1960s, the area was "mixed", with Catholics and Protestants living alongside each other. However, after violence broke out between the two communities, the area became segregated. The area to the south of Alliance Avenue became almost wholly populated by Catholics (who were mostly Irish nationalist and republican) while the area to the north (known as Glenbryn) became wholly populated by Protestants (who were mostly British unionist and loyalist). This left Holy Cross in the middle of a Protestant area and some of the schoolchildren had to walk through it to get to school. A 40-foot-high (12 m) wall (known as a "peace line") was built to separate the two communities. During the Troubles, almost 20 people were killed near the peace line by loyalists, republicans and the British Army.

In the mid-1990s, the Provisional Irish Republican Army (IRA) and the main loyalist paramilitary groups – the Ulster Defence Association (UDA) and Ulster Volunteer Force (UVF) – declared ceasefires. In 1998, the Good Friday Agreement was signed, which set up a government in which Irish nationalists/republicans and British unionists/loyalists were to share power. However, the political situation remained tense. So-called dissident republicans and dissident loyalists continued to wage small-scale violent campaigns.

In December 2000, Protestant taxi driver Trevor Kell was shot dead in Ardoyne. The IRA were suspected of involvement as forensic evidence linked the gun with an IRA shooting in 1997. This would make it the first sectarian killing for almost two years. The next day, loyalists retaliated by shooting dead Catholic man Gary Moore as he was renovating a house in Newtownabbey. Later, the IRA was blamed for the "punishment shooting" of two men, one of whom is believed to have been questioned over Kell's death.

The protesters claimed their homes were being regularly attacked by Catholics and that they were being denied access to facilities in the Catholic area, such as shops and playgrounds. Catholics claimed that their homes were also regularly attacked. The Protestant population of Glenbryn had dropped significantly since the ceasefires and some Protestants believed they were being driven out. Other protesters alleged that IRA members were using the children's journey to-and-from school to gather intelligence. Anne Bill, a community worker who was centrally involved in the protest, said "Protestants felt they weren't getting a fair deal under the Good Friday Agreement. People in Glenbryn kept telling the Government about attacks on their houses and how vulnerable they felt but we weren't being listened to. That is why people protested on the Ardoyne Road, the focus wasn't so much the school itself [...] The community in Glenbryn is in decline and it is fearful of Ardoyne. That does encourage a siege mentality".

Tension built and youths from both communities raised more and more flags along Ardoyne Road. On 19 June, a fight broke out between men putting up loyalist paramilitary flags and the occupants of a passing car. Loyalists allege that the car from republican Ardoyne estate rammed the ladder and knocked the two men off. How the episode started remains disputed. In the summer of 2001, the RUC received intelligence that UDA members were planning to "exploit community tensions" to kill Irish nationalists, Catholics and/or police officers.

== Summer 2001 ==
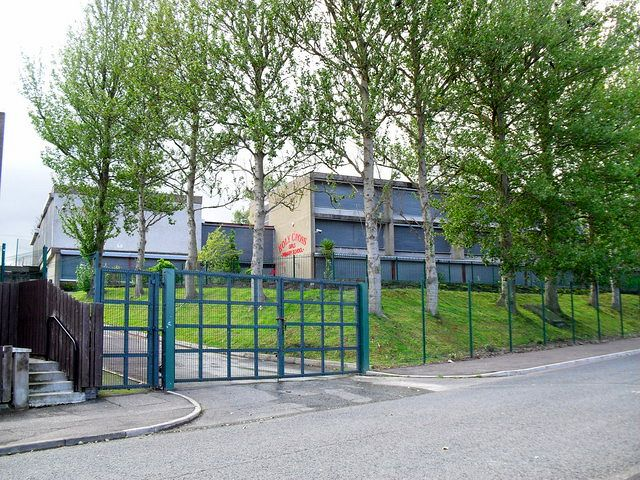
The entrance to Holy Cross Girls Primary School

On Tuesday 19 June, Royal Ulster Constabulary (RUC) officers had to protect children and parents entering the school after they were attacked by loyalist stone throwers. Police described the attack as "vicious". Following the incident, a blockade of the school developed, with loyalists standing across the road and RUC officers keeping the children and their parents away.

The following day, the school was forced to close when loyalists blocked the entrance. During the evening, hundreds of loyalists and nationalists (up to 600) clashed with each other and with the police. Shots were also fired at the police and over 100 petrol bombs were thrown. During the riots the police fired a number of the new 'L21A1' plastic baton rounds for the first time. 39 RUC officers were injured. Nine shots in total were fired – six from loyalists and three from republicans. The trouble came after an explosion at the rear of Catholic homes next to a peace line. Both loyalist and nationalist politicians blamed each other for the violence. This would be the first of many large riots to take place in Belfast within more than a year.

The morning blockade continued on Thursday 21 June. About 60 of the school's 230 pupils entered the school through the grounds of another school. Senior Sinn Féin member Gerry Kelly said: "It's like something out of Alabama in the 1960s". Three Protestant families left their homes in Ardoyne Avenue, saying they were afraid of a nationalist attack. During the evening and night there were serious disturbances in the area around the school. Loyalists fired ten shots, and threw six blast bombs and 46 petrol bombs at police lines. Two Catholic homes were attacked with pipe bombs, and a child was thrown against a wall by one of the blasts. 24 RUC officers were hurt.

On Friday 22 June, a number of schoolchildren again had to enter the school through the grounds of another school. This was the last day of school before the summer break.

Talks between the protesters and the schoolchildren's parents took place over the summer, but no agreement was reached. On 20 August, a 'paint bomb' was thrown at the home of a Protestant man in Hesketh Park, smashing a window and causing paint damage to furniture. The man had taken part in the loyalist protest.

== Autumn 2001 ==
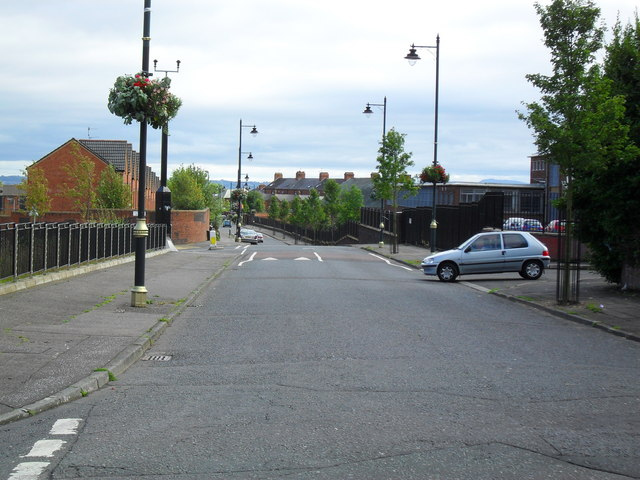
Part of Ardoyne Road

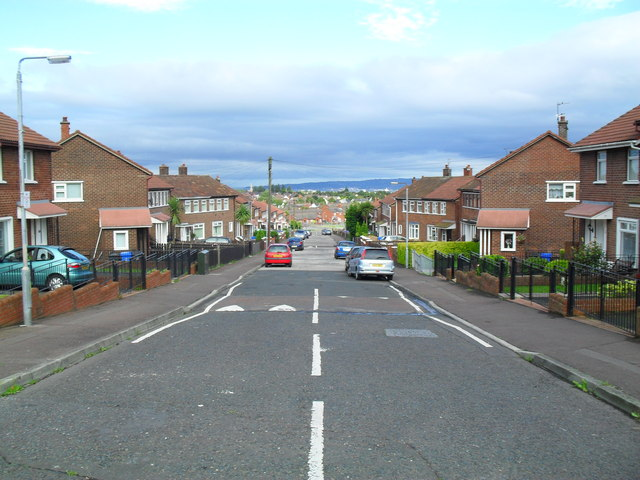
A street in Glenbryn, the Protestant area

The protest resumed on Monday 3 September, the first day of the Autumn school term. The RUC, supported by the British Army, were by then better prepared and managed to force a path through the protesters. Loyalists jeered and shouted sectarian abuse as the children, some as young as four, were escorted into the school by their parents and the police. Stones and bottles were thrown at the children and their parents; one woman was injured. A mother of one of the schoolgirls said: "It was absolutely terrifying. They were shouting 'dirty tramps', 'your kids are animals', 'Fenian scum', 'you Fenian bastards'. And all we were trying to do was get our kids to school". Unionist politicians claimed a "heavy-handed" police presence had inflamed the situation, while the Progressive Unionist Party's Billy Hutchinson alleged that five known IRA men had been allowed to walk with the children through the Protestant area.

Later in the day the Red Hand Defenders (RHD), an illegal loyalist paramilitary group, warned parents and children to stay away from the Ardoyne Road. A threat was also issued against police officers. During the evening there was violence near the school as youths from both sides attacked each other and the security forces. Three Catholic-owned homes on Newington Avenue were badly damaged in a loyalist pipe bomb attack. The blast caused an oil tank to catch fire and the flames spread to three houses, one of which was completely destroyed. Another pipe bomb exploded in the garden of a house in the White City area. There was also violence on North Queen Street and Limestone Road.

The following is a timeline of the major events during the Autumn protest.

Week one

- Tuesday 4 September: Loyalist protesters tried to block access to the school, but riot police forced a path through the protesters and lined the road with armoured vehicles, creating a cordon for the children and parents to walk through. Loyalists attacked riot police with a blast bomb (an improvised grenade), injuring one officer. As the children and parents made their way through the cordon, loyalist protesters shouted abuse and threw stones at them. Some of the children were forced to turn back. There was more rioting near the school during the evening and night. A crowd of loyalists attacked police with bricks, bottles, stones, fireworks, ballbearings and blast bombs. A volley of shots was also heard in the Glenbryn estate. Police figures stated that 41 police officers and two soldiers had been injured, fifteen blast bombs and 250 petrol bombs had been thrown, and four civilian cars had been damaged.
- Wednesday 5 September: As the parents and their children passed Glenbryn Parade, loyalists threw a blast bomb towards them. The device exploded, injuring four police officers and a police dog. Panic ensued. Children began screaming and "weeping uncontrollably" and one mother suffered a panic attack. All were taken to hospital. The Red Hand Defenders (RHD) said it was responsible for the attack. Afterward, Progressive Unionist Party (PUP) politician Billy Hutchinson said he was "ashamed to be a loyalist today after seeing these people attack young Catholic girls". However, he says he continued to stand with the protesters each morning to show leadership. John Reid, the British Secretary of State for Northern Ireland, called the attack "barbaric" and called for the protest to end immediately.
- Thursday 6 September: The protest was peaceful but very noisy as protesters used air horns (klaxons), blew whistles, and banged metal bin lids as the children passed through the security cordon. Four parents in the 'Right to Education' group were notified that death threats had been made against them by the RHD, who said they would be killed if they were seen taking their children to the school. John Reid, Secretary of State for Northern Ireland, cut short his holiday and returned to Northern Ireland because of the situation.
- Friday 7 September: Loyalists held a silent protest as children and parents passed through the security cordon. The silent protest was a mark of respect for Thomas McDonald (16), a Protestant killed in a hit-and-run incident after he had attacked a car with bricks and stones in another part of north Belfast on Tuesday. Catholic parents also held a minute's silence before beginning their walk to the school. Inside the school grounds, prayers involving clergymen from both denominations were said.

Week two

- Monday 10 September: The protesters were quiet as the children and their parents passed, but when the parents returned home the protesters used air horns (klaxons), blew whistles, and banged metal bin lids. Some of the protesters shouted "Fenian scum" at the parents. In London, Richard Haass, the United States Special Envoy for Northern Ireland, discussed the protest with John Reid. Senior Sinn Féin member Gerry Kelly introduced a private members' motion in the Northern Ireland Assembly, proposing that "the Assembly supports the right to education of children attending the Holy Cross Primary School in north Belfast". Unionist members proposed an amendment to the motion to make it apply to all schools in the area. The Assembly passed the amended motion.
- Tuesday 11 September: The protest followed the pattern of yesterday. Father Aidan Troy, Chairman of the school's Board of Governors, together with a local Protestant clergyman, held a meeting with representatives of the Concerned Residents of Upper Ardoyne (CRUA) who were organising the protest. John Reid also held a meeting with the representatives. Fr Troy said of the protest: "I really found it hard to comprehend the hatred that was shown to the school girls ... I walked with them and because of that I was spat on by the protesters. They held up posters accusing me of being a paedophile and they showed the children pornographic images. The intensity of the protest was hard to comprehend; I don't think people can really understand that from watching it on television".
- Wednesday 12 September: The protest followed the pattern of Monday and Tuesday. However, before going to the school the children and parents held a prayer service and a minute's silence for the victims of the September 11 attacks. On Friday, the protesters halted their protest for one day as a mark of respect for the victims of the attacks.

Week three

- Thursday 20 September: Protesters reverted to the earlier tactic of making a lot of noise as the children passed. Six men appeared before Belfast Magistrates Court on public order offences related to the school protest. The six men were remanded on bail but told not to take part in the protest. As a result of the arrests, the group representing the protesters, CRUA, announced that it had "suspended all business until further notice".

Week four

- Wednesday 26 September: Protesters threw fireworks at children and parents returning from the school during the afternoon. That evening, a loyalist protest which blocked the nearby Crumlin Road turned into a riot. Police said they moved to protect Catholic homes from loyalists and were attacked by gunfire, pipe bombs and petrol bombs. They responded with plastic bullets, and 33 officers were injured. There was further violence in the area the following night, and police came under fire from loyalists on Cambrai Street. Thirteen officers were injured in the violence and a woman was shot in the leg.

Week five

- Monday 1 October: Protesters continued their noisy protest as children and parents entered and left the school. Some protesters threw urine-filled balloons at the children and parents. Cups of cold tea and water were also thrown by protesters. Reg Empey (Ulster Unionist Party), then Acting First Minister of Northern Ireland, and Seamus Mallon (Social Democratic and Labour Party), then Deputy First Minister, met with local representatives to discuss the situation. Empy said there was no excuse for the ongoing protest.
- Tuesday 2 October: British Conservative MP Quentin Davies, then Shadow Secretary of State for Northern Ireland, accompanied parents and children as they returned home through the protest. Davies called the protest "utterly unacceptable".

Week six

- Tuesday 9 October: Aidan Troy, chairman of the school's Board of Governors, said he was considering taking legal action to try to end the protest. He said: "The weeks of suffering for these small girls were never justified ... This is no longer a legitimate protest; it is a form of child abuse". The cost of policing the protest was reported as having reached £1 million.
- Wednesday 10 October: Many of the protesters had begun to hide their identity and some were wearing masks of characters from horror movies. Local doctor Michael Tan said that some of the schoolchildren's families were near "breaking point" and parents and children were in need of professional psychological care. Brice Dickson, head of the Northern Ireland Human Rights Commission, visited the scene of the protest. He spoke to some of the protesters but was criticised by some of the parents of the children for not walking the route with them as Quentin Davies had done. One of the protesters displayed a threatening letter allegedly sent by a group called the "Catholic Reaction Force". Meanwhile, it was announced that the security wall between the loyalist and nationalist areas would be extended.

Week seven

- Monday 15 October: Brice Dickson again visited the protest and called for it to end. He said "The treatment of these children is inhumane and their right to effective education is being affected". Protestant parents in north and west Belfast said that there had been rising attacks on buses carrying Protestant schoolchildren.
- Wednesday 17 October: As children and parents were returning home from the school, a loyalist bomb exploded at the back of a house on Alliance Avenue. No one was injured but the householder, and a number of parents and children, were described as being "in shock".

Week eight

- Wednesday 24 October: There were disturbances on the Crumlin Road, not far from the school. Loyalists blocked the main road at about 4:30PM, stopping Catholic schoolchildren from getting home. Catholic families arrived to try to escort their children home. Bricks and bottles were thrown by both groups and police moved in to keep the sides apart. The Crumlin Road is the 'alternative' route that loyalists want the Holy Cross children and their parents to use when going to and from the school.
- Friday 26 October: Two people were arrested during the protest outside the school. Loyalists had tried to block the road and stop children parents from getting to the school. That night, loyalists threw a pipe bomb at a group of soldiers and police on the road, badly wounding a soldier and injuring several officers. The school was closed the following week after Halloween.

Week nine

- Monday 5 November: Protesters said they had reached an "understanding" with the Police Service of Northern Ireland (the former RUC, now renamed) over the weekend. As a result, the police were not wearing full riot gear when the protest took place.
- Wednesday 7 November: The mother of a child attending the school began legal proceedings against John Reid and the police. The mother said that police had not given enough protection to her daughter and had failed to identify, arrest, or prosecute protesters who broke the law in full public view. While on a visit to Northern Ireland, Archbishop Desmond Tutu met some of the schoolchildren and their parents. Tutu also met some of those involved in the protest.
- Friday 9 November: The protest was halted for one day. Some of the schoolchildren sat their "11-plus" exams. Mary McAleese, then President of Ireland, called for an end to the protest.

Week ten

- Monday 12 November: There was a change in the policing tactics used at the protest. Instead of gathering together all the Catholic parents and children and escorting them to the school as a group, the police specified a time period in which parents could walk to the school. About 400 police officers (an eighth of the total in Belfast) were there to ensure that the children could get to school. The day's operation cost an estimated £100,000. Some Catholic parents complained that the new police tactics left them more exposed to the protesters. Police arrested a nationalist who was taking a video of the protesters.

Week eleven

- Monday 19 November: The media reported that the father of one of the schoolgirls had begun a hunger strike. The man said that he felt so frustrated by the protest that he was refusing food in an attempt to end the blockade. It was also revealed that a split had occurred in CRUA, the protest group. It was reported that as many as five of its committee members may have resigned. They are believed to include spokesmen Stuart McCartney and Jim Potts.
- Tuesday 20 November: The Belfast Education and Library Board (BELB) provided two buses for those schoolchildren and parents who wished to use them to get through the protest. However, most of them made their way to the school on foot.
- Thursday 22 November: David Trimble (UUP), then First Minister, and Mark Durkan (SDLP), then Deputy First Minister, held a meeting with the protest group. Before calling an end to the protest the protesters asked for CCTV to be introduced, along with road-calming measures, and tighter security in the area.
- Friday 23 November: In the afternoon there was a rally in the middle of Belfast in support of the schoolchildren. About 500 people attended. In the evening the protest group held a meeting and announced that the protest would be "suspended".

For months after the protest ended, police and British Army armoured vehicles sat outside the school and at the junction of Alliance Avenue each day. However, eventually parents were able to walk their children to school without a police and Army escort.

== January 2002 ==
On Wednesday 9 January 2002, there were confrontations outside the school during the early afternoon. Disturbances and rioting quickly spread throughout Ardoyne during the evening and into the night. Catholic parents and Protestant residents each claimed that the other side had started the trouble. Catholic parents said that they had faced increased verbal abuse since Monday during their walks to and from school and that they were attacked while leaving the school on Wednesday afternoon. A Catholic mother claimed she was punched in the face as she walked home from the school with her child. Police officers said they arrived at a confrontation between a Protestant woman and a Catholic woman near the school. The police moved to make an arrest but the person was protected by other residents. Police officers said they had to draw their weapons. There was a report that loyalists had driven a car at the school gates in an attempt to break in. Some schoolchildren had to be taken home through the grounds of another school while a bus carrying other children was attacked on its way down Ardoyne Road. Protestant residents claimed the trouble started when Catholics removed a wreath from a lamp-post.

Up to 500 loyalists and nationalists were involved in the disturbances on the Ardoyne Road, Crumlin Road and Brompton Park areas. About 130 petrol bombs, acid bombs and fireworks were thrown. Four Catholic youths were hospitalised after being hit by shotgun pellets at Hesketh Park; loyalists petrol-bombed and destroyed a police vehicle; Catholic homes were attacked on the Upper Crumlin Road; a Catholic woman was knocked-down by a car on Twaddell Avenue; a Catholic man was struck by a police vehicle, and a 13-year-old Protestant schoolboy was injured when a bus was attacked. The police fired eight plastic bullets and arrested three people. As the trouble worsened, 200 police officers, backed by 200 soldiers, were deployed. At least 14 police officers were injured.

The following day, the Holy Cross school was forced to close for the day. Some other schools in the area closed early due to fears about the safety of schoolchildren. In the morning, six loyalists, one with a gun, rampaged through the grounds of Our Lady of Mercy Catholic girls' secondary school, smashing 18 cars with crowbars. Parents rushed to collect their daughters. In the afternoon, Protestant pupils from Boys' Model Secondary School were ferried home in police armoured Land Rovers past nationalist crowds on Crumlin Road. Catholic parents and Protestant residents held separate meetings to discuss the situation.

On Friday 11 January, the Red Hand Defenders issued a death threat against all Catholic teachers and all other staff working at Catholic schools in north Belfast. That weekend, two Catholic schools were set on fire and teachers' cars were attacked. On Monday, more than 750 armed police officers and soldiers were sent to guard Catholic schools in north Belfast while armoured vehicles lined Ardoyne Road. There was no protest outside the school and there was no serious violence, although there were a few minor scuffles. The Northern Ireland Office announced that permanent CCTV cameras would be installed on the Ardoyne Road. A temporary system was to be put in place while waiting for the permanent installation.

In February 2002, Holy Cross schoolchildren travelled to County Galway for a free holiday as guests of Peacock's Hotel. The owners of the hotel had made the offer of the holiday following the 2001 protests. Twenty of the schoolchildren also met Bertie Ahern, then Taoiseach, during a short visit to Dublin. Ahern said it would show support for the children from the people of the Republic.

In June, James Adair – brother of UDA leader Johnny Adair – was jailed for six months for riotous behaviour and given a concurrent sentence of four months for obstructing police during the riots.

== Aftermath ==
The Holy Cross protest was said to have heightened sectarian tensions in Northern Ireland in a way not seen since the Drumcree dispute in the mid-1990s. PUP politician Billy Hutchinson said "The protest was a disaster in terms of putting their cause forward but it was a genuine expression of their anger and frustration and fear over what is happening in that part of North Belfast".

A month before the protest was ended the Department of Social Development announced a housing redevelopment package for Glenbryn. This angered some Catholics and nationalists, particularly in north Belfast, where almost 80% of those on the housing waiting list were Catholics. They saw the package as a "buy-off" for Glenbryn residents. Ardoyne Sinn Féin councillor Margaret McClenaghan says the common perception was that loyalists were being rewarded for intimidating schoolgirls. However, one Protestant community activist said "There is no victory for our area despite all the hype. It is actually a strategy of social political engineering between the NlO and the Housing Executive, to solve the issue of interface tension". He explained that 186 houses would be demolished and that only about 20% would be replaced. This, he said, would mean a shrinking of the Protestant population in Glenbryn.

During the protest, a number of schoolchildren were moved to other schools. Applications for enrollment at Holy Cross had dropped by almost half.

Since the end of the protest, steps have been taken to heal relations. The North Belfast Community Action Unit was set up to foster inter-community talks, focusing on social and economic issues of interest to Ardoyne and Glenbryn. Nevertheless, community workers from both sides admit progress has been slow.

In December 2024 papers declassified under the thirty-year rule revealed that the government of the Republic of Ireland had offered Fr Aiden Troy the use of a flat leased by the Department of Foreign Affairs in Belfast after he received death threats. He declined the offer as he didn't want to leave Ardoyne and feared that drawing publicity to the threats would have an adverse effect on the children.

=== Effect on the schoolchildren ===
Brendan Bradley, head of the Survivors of Trauma group (which deals with victims of Troubles-related violence), said that the trauma experienced by the children was "almost without parallel" in the history of the Troubles:

It wasn't as though this abuse lasted for a couple of days or was a one-off; it went on for months. Many needed counselling, some long-term counselling, in the wake of it all. Parents told how their daughters had changed from being fun-loving to being very withdrawn.

Fr Aidan Troy said that some of the schoolgirls had been "put on heavy tranquillizers such as diazepam ... because of the trauma they were experiencing". Parents spoke of how their children had been wetting the bed and had started to throw tantrums and become withdrawn. When Holy Cross teachers asked girls in Primary 6 (aged 9–10) to draw a picture many had drawn mothers and fathers crying, surrounded by people with angry faces.

== Later incidents ==
In 2003, Loyalists placed a pipe bomb at the entrance of the school, it was defused and there were no injuries.

In 2003, a BBC televised drama called Holy Cross was made about the dispute, though it was filmed in Liverpool. Fr Aidan Troy, head of the board of governors of the school, expressed concern that the drama could reignite the problem. The film was produced by BBC Northern Ireland in association with RTÉ. Although based on the events which occurred, it was somewhat fictionalised, and told through the eyes of two families on opposite sides of the divide. The film stars Zara Turner and Bronagh Gallagher, and broadcast on RTÉ One on 8 November 2003, and on BBC One on 10 November 2003.

In April 2013, loyalists erected Union Jacks and loyalist flags outside the school and painted the kerbstones at its entrance red, white and blue. On 25 April the Police Service of Northern Ireland (PSNI) were called to the school to disperse a loyalist protest being held outside it. The protest was sparked by false rumours on social networks that Belfast City Council employees were due to arrive to remove the flags and the paint.

In the early hours of Sunday 23 April 2017, a bomb was found by a police patrol outside the gates of Holy Cross Boys' Primary School in Ardoyne. The police said the bomb was "significant in terms of its [undisclosed] shape", and that police on foot patrol were the likely target. A sense of outrage was reported in the area.
