= Peace lines =

Separation barriers in Northern Ireland

Map of peace lines in Belfast

Major peace lines Minor peace lines and other associated barriers

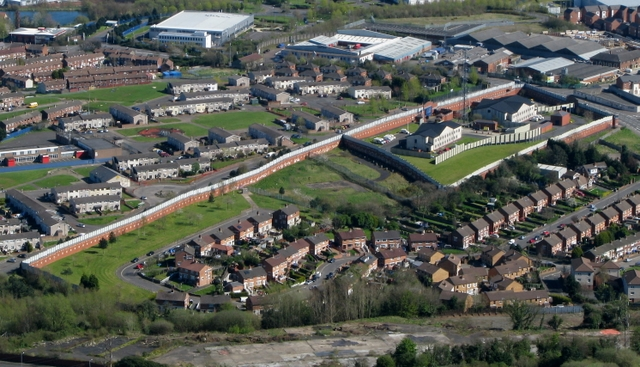
A 5.5-metre-high (18-foot) peace line along Springmartin Road in Belfast, with a fortified police station at one end

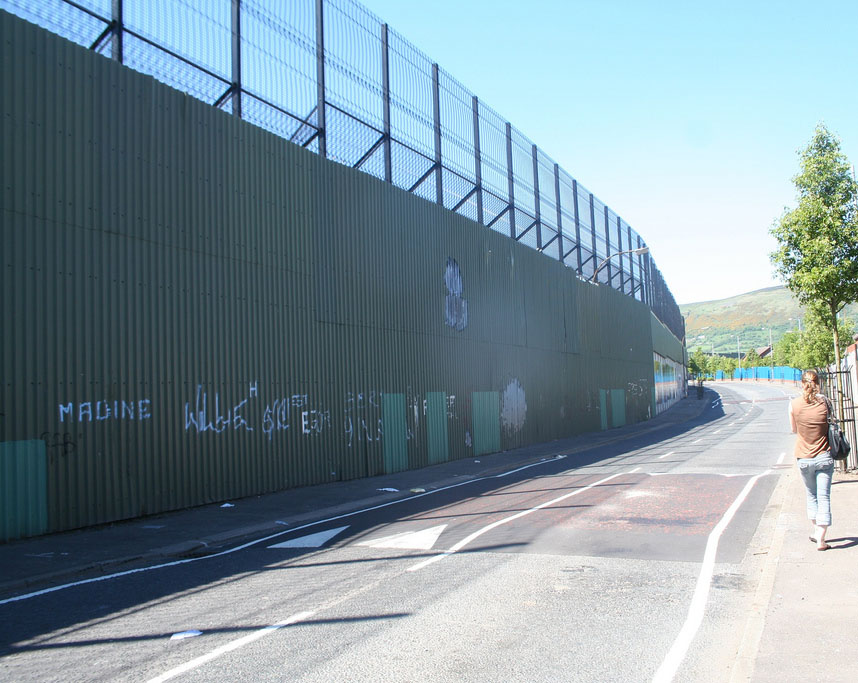
The peace line along Cupar Way in Belfast, seen from the predominantly Protestant side

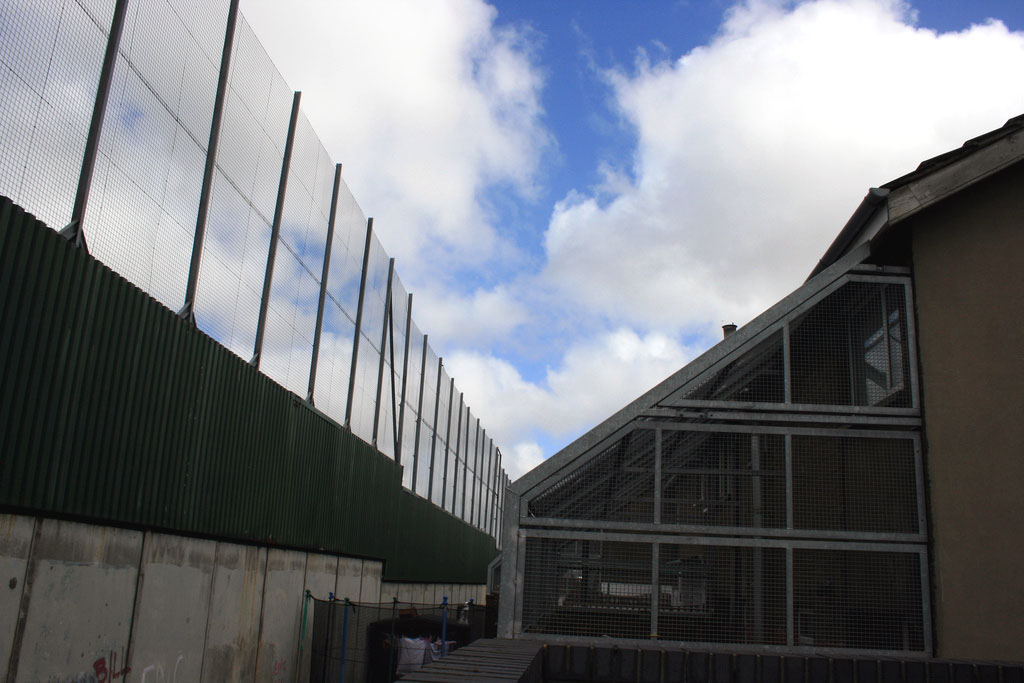
The peace line at Bombay Street/Cupar Way in Belfast, seen from the predominantly Catholic side

The peace lines or peace walls are a series of separation barriers in Northern Ireland that separate predominantly Irish republican or nationalist Catholic neighbourhoods from predominantly British loyalist or unionist Protestant neighbourhoods. They have been built at urban interface areas in Belfast and elsewhere.

The majority of peace walls are located in Belfast, but they also exist in other regions of Northern Ireland with more than 32 kilometres (20 miles) in total.

== History ==
Although temporary peace walls were built in Belfast in the 1920s (in Ballymacarett) and 1930s (in Sailortown), the first peace lines of "the Troubles" era were built in 1969, following the outbreak of civil unrest and the 1969 Northern Ireland riots. They were initially built as temporary structures, but due to their effectiveness they have become wider, longer, more numerous and more permanent. Originally few in number, they have multiplied over the years, from 18 in the early 1990s to at least 59 as of late 2017; in total they stretch over 34 kilometres (21 miles), with most located in Belfast. They have been increased in both height and number since the Good Friday Agreement of 1998. Three-quarters of Belfast's estimated 97 peace lines and related structures (such as gates and closed roads) are in the north and west of the city. These are also the poorer and more disadvantaged areas of Belfast. 67% of deaths during the sectarian violence occurred within 500 metres (550 yd) of one of these "interface structures".

The stated purpose of the peace lines is to minimise inter-communal violence between Catholics (most of whom are nationalists who self-identify as Irish) and Protestants (most of whom are unionists who self-identify as British).

The peace lines range in length from a few hundred metres (yards) to over 5 kilometres (3 mi). They may be made of iron, brick, steel or a combination of the three and are up to 8 metres (25 feet) high. Some have gates in them that allow passage during daylight but are closed at night.

In recent years, they have become locations for tourism. Black taxis now take groups of tourists around Belfast's peace lines, trouble spots and famous murals.

Notable peace lines separate the nationalist Falls Road and unionist Shankill Road areas of West Belfast; the nationalist Short Strand and the unionist Cluan Place areas of East Belfast; the unionist Corcrain Road and the nationalist Obins Drive in Portadown; and the unionist Fountain Estate and nationalist Bishop Street area of Derry.

In 2008, a public discussion began about how and when the peace lines could be removed. Belfast City Council agreed to develop a strategy regarding the removal of peace walls on 1 September 2011. At the end of 2011, several local community initiatives resulted in the opening of a number of interface structures for a trial period. A study was released in 2012 indicating that 69% of residents believe that the peace walls are still necessary because of potential violence.

In January 2012, the International Fund for Ireland launched a Peace Walls funding programme to support local communities who want to work towards beginning to remove the peace walls. In May 2013, the Northern Ireland Executive committed to the removal of all peace lines by mutual consent by 2023.

In 2017, the Belfast Interface Project published a study entitled "Interface Barriers, Peacelines & Defensive Architecture" that identified 97 separate walls, barriers and interfaces in Belfast. A history of the development of these structures can be found at the Peacewall Archive.

In September 2017, the Northern Ireland Department of Justice published its Interface Programme, established to deliver the commitment made by the Northern Ireland Executive to remove all Interface structures by 2023 under the Together: Building a United Community Strategy. By the end of 2023, more than 100 barriers still remained, but none had gone up since 2008. Surveyed in 2022, 83% stated they wanted the peace walls to come down. New figures released by the Department of Justice in 2026 revealed that the number of official peace walls remaining in Northern Ireland had dropped to 39.

In September 2019, a series of events were held in Belfast to mark the anniversary of 50 years of peace lines in the city. This included an international conference alongside other events to discuss the past and possible future of the peace lines.

== See also ==
- Defensive wall
- Interface area
- Segregation in Northern Ireland
