= List of Northern Ireland riots =

The following are a list of riots that have occurred in Northern Ireland.

Name	Dates	Locations	Cause	Deaths	Wounded	Ref
1969 Northern Ireland riots	12–16 August 1969	Mainly Derry, Belfast, Newry, Armagh, Crossmaglen, Dungannon, Coalisland, Dungiven	Tensions between Ulster Protestants and Irish Catholics	8	750+	
1997 Northern Ireland riots	6–11 July 1997	Irish nationalist districts of Northern Ireland	Drumcree conflict (The Troubles)	2	162+	
Holy Cross dispute	19 June 2001 – 11 January 2002	Ardoyne, Belfast	Tensions between Ulster Protestants and Irish Catholics	0	170+	
July 2001 Belfast riots	12 July 2001	Belfast	Tensions between Irish republicans and Ulster loyalists	0	113+	
November 2001 Belfast riots	11 November & 16–17 November 2001	Belfast	Tensions between Irish republicans and Ulster loyalists	0	28+	
2005 Belfast riots	10 – 12 September 2005	Belfast and County Antrim	Tensions between Irish republicans and Ulster loyalists	0	81	
2010 Northern Ireland riots	11–15 July 2010	Belfast, Derry, and County Armagh	Tensions between Irish republicans and Ulster loyalists	0	83	
2011 Northern Ireland riots	20 June – 16 July 2011	Belfast, Portadown, Newry, Ballyclare, Larne, Derry, Ballymena	Tensions between Irish republicans and Ulster loyalists	0	300	
2012 North Belfast riots	12 July, 25 August, and 2–4 September 2012	Belfast	Tensions between Irish republicans and Ulster loyalists	0	92	
Belfast City Hall flag protests	3 December 2012 – 30 November 2013	Belfast	Belfast City Council voting to limit the number of days the Union Jack was flown from Belfast City Hall	0	157	
2013 Belfast riots	12–17 July & 9 August 2013	Belfast	Tensions between Irish republicans and Ulster loyalists	0	90+	
2018 Derry riots	8–13 July 2018	Derry	Tensions between Irish republicans and Ulster loyalists	Uncertain	Uncertain	
2021 Northern Ireland riots	30 March – 9 April 2021	Belfast, Carrickfergus, and Derry	Northern Ireland Protocol, the funeral of Bobby Storey, and the COVID-19 pandemic	0	88	
2025 Ballymena riots	9 June – 18 June 2025	Ballymena, Belfast, Carrickfergus, Coleraine, Lisburn and Newtownabbey	Alleged attempted rape of a girl by two Romanian teenagers, anti-immigration	0	32	
2026 Northern Ireland riots	9 June 2026	Various places around Northern Ireland, particularly Belfast	Stabbing attack, Anti-immigration sentiment	0	Uncertain	
