= Belfast riots =

Belfast riots may refer to:

- 1886 Belfast riots
- July 2001 Belfast riots
- November 2001 Belfast riots
- 2005 Belfast riots
- 2012 North Belfast riots
- Belfast City Hall flag protests
- 2013 Belfast riots
- 2026 Northern Ireland riots

== See also ==
- List of Northern Ireland riots
