= Roll of Honour (song) =

Irish rebel song

"Roll of Honour" is an Irish rebel song by the Irish rebel band, The Irish Brigade. It commemorates the ten Provisional IRA and INLA volunteers who died during the 1981 Irish hunger strike in Northern Ireland. It was written by Gerry O'Glacain, and was released on the band's 1983 album of the same name.

The strikers are listed in the order of their death and described as being "Ireland's bravest men". The song ends with the call to "Fight on and make our homeland a nation once again".

In 2014 the song entered the UK Singles Chart at number 33, remaining in the chart for one week.

== Legislation ==
Since the enactment of the Offensive Behaviour at Football and Threatening Communications (Scotland) Act 2012, singing Roll of Honour at Scottish football matches by some supporters of Celtic F.C. has led to arrests and convictions for singing "a song in support of a proscribed terrorist organisation". However some prosecutions have resulted in acquittals with one sheriff stating "If they can proscribe a list of songs which people are banned from singing, they will find the courts are full and the football grounds are empty."

The Green Brigade group of Celtic fans believe that the 2012 Act is "a ridiculous piece of legislation" which has resulted in "expressions of Irish identity, culture and politics being deemed illegal" and highlighted the hypocrisy of the legislation at the Celtic game on 23 November 2013: while ‘Roll of Honour’ was being sung, banners were displayed containing the lyric from the Scottish national anthem: ‘they fought and died for; their wee bit hill and glen’.

In December 2013, seven members of the Green Brigade appeared in court and pleaded not guilty to the charge of having behaved in a way that "is likely or would be likely to incite public disorder" by singing the Roll of Honour at Celtic Park, with trial set for June 2014. In October 2014 two men were convicted and fined following charges surrounding the singing of the pro-IRA song at a match between Hibs and Celtic at Easter Road on 19 October 2013.

== See also ==
- "Billy Boys"
- "Famine Song"
- "The Boys of the Old Brigade"
