= 2012 North Belfast riots =

2012 riots in Northern Ireland

2012 North Belfast Riots
- Date: 12 July 2012; 25 August 2012; 2–4 September 2012
- Location: North Belfast, West Belfast
- Methods: Demonstrations; rioting; car burnings; houses damaged; gun battles
- Result: 92 PSNI officers injured; Damage to cars and property; High tensions in the area; Strong criticism of the Parades Commission

Lead figures
92 PSNI officers injured	25+ arrests

During the 2012 North Belfast Riots sectarian disorder and rioting between loyalists and republicans occurred when rival parades, authorised by the Parades Commission, took place.

== 12 July riot ==
The first incident occurred on 12 July 2012 during "The Twelfth" Loyalist celebrations. There was also violence in the Bogside area of Derry, where petrol bombs were thrown at police and a car set alight. In south and east Belfast there were five arrests for a variety of offences including disorderly behaviour.

On 18 July 2012, a 47-year-old man was charged with attempted murder of the police officers. The PSNI blamed the violence on "thugs" and made a further 26 arrests across Northern Ireland relating to the trouble.

In another incident during a different parade, a Shankill Road-based loyalist band "The Young Conway Volunteers" was filmed by a Sinn Féin activist playing "The Famine Song" outside St Patricks Catholic Church in North Belfast. The activist filming the incident was attacked by band members who tried to snatch the phone from him. The incident brought condemnation, with Sinn Féin declaring it "provocative." Protestant church leaders also condemned the incident as "blatantly sectarian". It was this incident that was believed to have ignited tensions in the area which continued over the next few months.

In the days that followed strong loyalist criticism was levelled at the Parades Commission blaming them for the violence. Nigel Dodds of the Democratic Unionist Party (DUP) accused the Parades Commission of making a "bizarre, crazy, and mad decision" to allow the nationalist parade to coincide with the Orange parade while Sinn Féin's Gerry Kelly blamed the Orangemen for violating regulations set out by the Parades Commission. The Parades Commission denied responsibility, explaining "We have to balance the rights of everybody concerned in parades, not just the rights of paraders, but the rights of people who live in the areas and the rights of police officers."

== 25 August disorder ==
In the buildup to the Royal Black Institution March, also taking place in Ardoyne, the Parades Commission banned the loyalist band "The Young Conway Volunteers", who played the controversial Famine Song outside St Patrick's Catholic Church during the 12 July parade. During the march, however, the Young Conway Volunteers still marched past St. Patrick's in defiance of the ruling, leading to more rioting by nationalist youths. Seven PSNI officers were injured (one female officer suffered minor head injuries) and three people, including a 13-year-old, were arrested for the riotous behaviour.

The DUP and Sinn Féin again blamed opposite sides for the violence: the DUP's Nigel Dodds blamed nationalist protestors for the disorder and a Sinn Féin Member of the Legislative Assembly (MLA), Carál Ní Chuilín, condemned loyalist bands for breaching regulations set out by the Parades Commission.

== 2–4 September riots ==
On 2 September 2012, a Republican parade, organised by the Henry Joy McCracken Flute Band and Republican Network for Unity which took place in North Belfast was deemed "uncontentious" by the Parades Commission. Tensions, however, between the Loyalist and Nationalist communities of North Belfast were still high leading to the worst rioting since July 2012.

As the parade passed through the Loyalist Carlisle Circus area, about 350 Loyalist youths attacked Republican marchers and PSNI lines with bricks, golf balls, fireworks, and petrol bombs. Loyalists launched attacks from Clifton Nursing Home whose residents were evacuated when windows were smashed and their bins were set on fire and used as barriers by Loyalists. Nationalist "Network For Unity" claimed, "Republicans were showered with a barrage of bricks, stones, golf balls and bottles," and that women and children were injured as well. However, during the parade, as supporters passed an Orange Hall at Clifton Lane, Nationalists hurled golf balls and bricks at the building.

On 3 September 2012 violence flared up again between the PSNI and Loyalist youths when about 100 Loyalists gathered at Denmark Street and about the same number of Nationalists at Antrim Road, both reported to be attacking police lines with petrol bombs, bricks and other missiles. Eyewitnesses report that loyalists hijacked a bus and set fire to it near the scene of the previous nights rioting and that the PSNI have deployed water cannon in an effort to quell the violence Reports say that in the Monday night violence 15 PSNI officers were injured, it has also been reported that the PSNI started to fire baton rounds to quell the violence.

The next day, Assistant Chief Constable Will Kerr of the PSNI challenged politicians of Northern Ireland to "sort this out and sort it out now" in the run up to a loyalist march in honour of the 100th anniversary of the Ulster Covenant on 29 September, fearing someone may be killed in the coming days and weeks. "Collectively, we cannot afford night after night of violence in our streets."

Sporadic retaliatory attacks between Loyalists and Nationalists, in the Denmark Street and Antrim Road areas, continued until at least 2:00 am the following morning. The PSNI used water cannons to keep Loyalists at bay in Denmark Street and separated rival gangs of Loyalists and Nationalists at Antrim Road, Carlisle Circus. The violence extended to other areas of Belfast when Sinn Féin's Gerry Kelly alleged that a Catholic home in West Belfast had been attacked by Loyalists with petrol bombs. Forty-seven PSNI officers were injured in the rioting; four required hospital treatment. So far seven men including a 19-year-old teenager in Denmark Street have been arrested in relation to the incident.

In the aftermath, Gerry Kelly (Sinn Féin) claimed that the Loyalist paramilitary group, Ulster Volunteer Force (UVF), was responsible for orchestrating the violence in North Belfast: "There was clearly a well-planned and orchestrated attempt yesterday to further heighten tensions in North Belfast around parading and it was, in my view, planned and orchestrated by the UVF." Billy Hutchinson, leader of the Progressive Unionist Party (PUP) furiously denied this claim: "I just don't know where he got this from. I can categorically state that there was no involvement from the UVF in any way in this violence. The UVF are committed to the principles of the Good Friday agreement." However, later the PSNI Chief Superintendent George Clark commented, "The violence did come from both sides of the community but initially, certainly, it came from within Loyalism. There was clearly orchestration, there's no doubt about that." However, he said it was too early to know whether Loyalist paramilitaries like the UVF were responsible for the orchestration. Alban Maginness of the Social Democratic and Labour Party(SDLP) also claimed that paramilitary involvement was to blame for the trouble, but wasn't specific as to whether he suspected Loyalist or Nationalist paramilitaries.

On 4 September 2012 The Guardian reported that "Loyalist Sources" were claiming that members of the UVF and Ulster Defence Association (UDA) were involved in the violence. Constable Kerr of the PSNI later said "We have no evidence that the UVF officially sanctioned or orchestrated the violence over the past couple of nights but you cannot have violence take place in those areas and not have members of Loyalist paramilitary groups involved." He added, "Undoubtedly there were people from those groups involved in the disorder but equally there were people from those groups trying to quell and restore order". Deputy First Minister Martin Mcguinness issued a statement urging people to obey the rules set out by the Parade Commission.

Disorder continued for a third night in North Belfast on 4 September when a crowd of around 200 loyalists gathered in the troubled Denmark Street and pelted police lines with fireworks, bricks and stones. 3 PSNI officers sustained minor injuries in the trouble including a police inspector. However, on this night the police succeeded in dispersing the loyalist crowd, and water cannon which moved into the area, were withdrawn later without being used.

On 5 September, Northern Ireland First Minister Peter Robinson issued a public statement, condemning those involved in the violence in North Belfast, and stated that he wanted to see the end of the Parades Commission. Whilst Deputy first minister Martin Mcguinness also condemned the riots as "deplorable, disgraceful, and shameful" and accused the Loyal Order of showing a "distinct lack of leadership." That same day the two men met for cross party talks involving North Belfast assembly members and local DUP MP Nigel Dodds.

On 6 September, the Royal Black institution apologised "for any offence caused" to the clergy and parishioners of St Patricks Church when their bands marched past the church in defiance of the Parades Commission's ruling on 25 August, Fr Michael Sheehan of the church issued a statement stating that "I welcome this positive development, and the sincere Christian spirit behind it".

== See also ==
- Belfast City Hall flag protests
- 2013 Belfast riots
- 2011 Northern Ireland riots
- 2005 Belfast riots
