= 2025 Northern Ireland riots =

Riots in Northern Ireland

- Date: 9–18 June 2025 (1 week and 2 days)
- Location: Various places around Northern Ireland (Note: Ballymena, Belfast, Carrickfergus, Coleraine, Derry, Larne, Lurgan, Newry, Newtownabbey and Portadown)
- Caused by: Alleged sexual assault of a teenage girl by two Romanian Roma teenagers Anti-immigration sentiment Sectarianism
- Methods: Rioting; protest; vandalism; arson
- Result: Exodus of two thirds of the Roma population from Ballymena

Parties
Rioters	Northern Ireland Executive; Department of Justice; Police Service of Northern Ireland; Support from: Police Scotland; Northern Ireland Fire and Rescue Service

Casualties and losses
56 arrested	107 police officers injured
- 3+ police vehicles damaged Multiple homes damaged Multiple businesses damaged Multiple cars torched
- Map of riots and protests Riots and disorder Protests

From 9-18 June 2025, riots broke out across Northern Ireland after two Romanian Roma teenagers were charged with attempted rape after allegedly sexually assaulting a teenage girl in Ballymena, a town in County Antrim. Police said the disorder was targeted at ethnic minorities and law enforcement. Across two weeks of disorder, a total of 107 police officers were injured whilst 56 people were arrested, with 27 remanded into custody; across five of the nights, police used a total of 32 attenuating energy projectiles.

On the first night of disorder, which was confined to Ballymena, two police cars and multiple properties were damaged, with fifteen police officers being injured and one rioter arrested. The second night saw a further seventeen police officers injured and five people arrested with more property damage across the town; disorder also occurred in Belfast, Carrickfergus, and Newtownabbey. The third night saw more disorder throughout Northern Ireland: nine police officers were injured and seven people were arrested in Ballymena, whilst a leisure centre in Larne was set ablaze. The fourth night saw some respite for Ballymena, with Portadown experiencing the most disorder: 22 police officers were injured there and two people were arrested. Disorder continued for at least six more nights, albeit at a much less violent level.

== Background ==
From the late 1960s to 1998, Northern Ireland was in the midst of an ethno-nationalist conflict known as the Troubles. The Good Friday Agreement brought an end to hostilities, alongside an increase in the immigrant population (though significantly less than England and Wales or Scotland), although suspicion between communities (particularly from unionist/loyalist groups against those considered to be outsiders) has led to a hostile environment for immigrant groups.

On 7 June 2025, a teenage girl was allegedly sexually assaulted on Clonavon Terrace in Ballymena and the Police Service of Northern Ireland (PSNI) charged two teenage boys with attempted rape. The two boys were ethnic Roma from Romania. On 9 June, the 14-year-old boys appeared at Coleraine Magistrates' Court via videolink from Woodlands Juvenile Justice Centre in Bangor, County Down. They spoke through a Romanian interpreter and denied the charges of attempted oral rape. They were remanded until 2 July, when they are due to appear at Ballymena Magistrates' Court's youth court. Residents have described longstanding tensions with the Roma community, but the alleged assault ignited the spark that led to the riots.

The riots led to questioning of the PSNI's ability to deal with such events, with the BBC describing them coming at "a time of crisis" for the police. At the time of the riots, they had around 6,200 officers, around 1,500 of whom were either on sickness absence or restricted duties; when the force was started it had 9,000 officers, and a number of official reports have suggested they should have at least 7,500. The Chief Constable of the PSNI, Jon Boutcher, has repeatedly warned that the police service was "critically underfunded" and their lack of officers ultimately led to mutual aid requests, something which had occurred the previous year during the nationwide riots which started following the Southport stabbing.

Although the PSNI denied any loyalist paramilitary involvement, Daniel Holder, director of the Committee on the Administration of Justice (a human rights advocacy group), said the riots followed a pattern of unrest similar to other outbreaks of far-right anti-immigrant violence in Northern Ireland since 2023 in areas with "significant loyalist activity", featuring a "degree of paramilitary control", with such riots taking place during the (mostly unionist) marching season. Holder dismissed accounts of nationalist involvement in the riots in Ballymena.

== Timeline ==
=== 9 June ===
At around 19:30 GMT hundreds of people gathered near Ballymena town centre for a vigil; they peacefully gathered in the Galgorm Road area before making their way towards Clonavon Terrace, the site of the assault, via Larne Street, Wakehurt Road and Queen Street. Police were in attendance at the vigil, which the PSNI described as initially peaceful.

Rioting broke out in Ballymena after a group of masked people broke away from the protest and started to attack properties and build barricades on Clonavon Terrace. Rioters threw bricks, fireworks and petrol bombs at police over several hours, with two police cars being damaged. One baton round was fired by police and hit a rioter; fifteen police officers were injured amid the violence, some of whom had to go to hospital. One family with three children described having to "barricade themselves into their attic" as they "heard people rampage" downstairs. Three people were evacuated as four homes were damaged by fire, with six properties on Clonavon Terrace sustaining damage to doors and windows; several business units at Galgorm Parks also had their windows smashed.

The PSNI described their officers being under "sustained attack" for several hours. The chairman of the PSNI said their actions "prevented a pogrom". Local media estimated that 2,500 people had gathered for the unrest, which was described as "anti-immigrant" by some. Police said they had arrested a 29-year-old man on suspicion of riotous and disorderly behaviour, attempted criminal damage and resisting police. They added that they were also investigating a report of arson in nearby Cullybackey which they said was "being dealt with as a racially motivated hate crime"; a petrol bomb was thrown at a vehicle and set it alight, with damage spreading to a nearby property with a woman and two children inside.

=== 10 June ===
On 10 June, an estimated 300 people gathered in the same area as a second night of disorder broke out. Police discharged numerous baton rounds and fired a water cannon at rioters in an attempt to disperse the crowds. Various objects including fireworks, glass, petrol bombs and pieces of metal were thrown at riot police as riot vans were used to block some roads. Multiple houses' windows were smashed and many cars were torched, including a Filipino man's car which was overturned and left burnt out on the street. One rioter failed to throw a petrol bomb at riot police and was engulfed in flames. The disorder left 17 PSNI officers injured, bringing the total to 32, and five people were arrested. In response to the attack on the Filipino national, residents began hanging the Union Jack, the flag of England, or the flag of Ulster and posting stickers and messages on their doorways and windows declaring themselves as either British or Filipino households with their corresponding flags to deter rioters.

Protests also broke out in other places around Northern Ireland, including Belfast, Coleraine and Lisburn. In Carrickfergus, two bins were set alight and police had bottles and masonry thrown at them; bins were also set alight in Newtownabbey, where a man was arrested on suspicion of disorderly behaviour. Traffic was disrupted at Carlisle Circus in Belfast as a small group of people protesting about migrants blocked the road. The following day police said they were investigating a number of reports of criminal damage and arson in north Belfast which they were treating as "racially-motivated hate crimes": three properties sustained damage in Oakley Street after a car was set alight; three vehicles were set alight elsewhere; a motorbike was destroyed in an arson attack; and two properties had windows smashed in Legann Street.

=== 11 June ===
On 11 June, Police Scotland agreed to send officers to Northern Ireland following a request from the PSNI for extra support under mutual aid agreements, with the PSNI saying they had requested 80 officers from Great Britain. Some people on social media called for rush hour protests at various locations across the country, sparking fears of further disorder.

In Ballymena, crowds gathered for a third night with a heavy police presence of around 60 TSG officers in the town. Numerous police Land Rovers were at the scene blocking roads as police dogs were deployed, with people throwing fireworks and other objects at police. A water cannon was deployed after petrol bombs started to be thrown, and the windows of a house were smashed. Police also fired baton rounds at rioters and a hatchet was found among the items thrown at them. Nine police officers were injured and five people were arrested. Two more people were arrested in connection with these riots the following day.

A leisure centre in Larne, which had been providing emergency shelter for those displaced from Ballymena, was attacked by around 100 people and set on fire. Although those being temporarily housed there were moved before the disorder, other people were still inside the building attending swimming and yoga classes. The yoga class had to flee after a brick was thrown through a window. Danny Donnelly, the MLA for East Antrim, described it as a "sustained attack", adding that bricks were thrown at police and staff had to flee through the back door.

In Coleraine, petrol bombs were thrown at police officers after a bus was attacked and bins were set alight on the tracks at the railway station, causing bus and train services to be cancelled. A tyre shop was broken into, with rioters stealing tyres to add to the fire. In Newtownabbey, a teenager was arrested in connection with disorder in the area. Police said protests in Antrim and Lisburn passed without incident and traffic was disrupted after protesters blocked a road in Carrickfergus. They also said that there were a number of protests across Belfast which were "mainly peaceful", although traffic was disrupted in the Shankill and Shore Road areas. In Magherafelt, a group of protesters faced off with another group holding Palestine flags, with police monitoring the situation.

=== 12 June ===
On 12 June, three teenage boys aged 15, 17 and 18 were charged with rioting following the disorder in Ballymena on 10 June; the 15-year-old was also charged with criminal damage and two other teenage boys were released on bail. Residents in Portadown received a letter from a housing association advising them to leave their homes and secure properties ahead of a planned protest.

No disorder was reported at Ballymena, although there was still a large police presence with Land Rovers parked in locations where rioting had previously occurred. Around 400 people gathered in Portadown, where there was a heavy police presence with 20 vehicles and a helicopter as officers blocked off some streets. Disorder broke out later in the evening as objects were taken from a derelict building and thrown at police, leading to warnings that baton rounds would be fired unless crowds dispersed. An empty keg was among the items thrown at police, who also had to put out a number of fires in the town. One protester was filmed being shoved by a police officer who proceeded to pepper spray him whilst crowds cheered in the background after a petrol bomb exploded against a police vehicle. A water cannon was also deployed, with police using batons to for crowd control. A total of 22 police officers were injured in Portadown, with the PSNI reporting two arrests. A number of "mostly peaceful" protests occurred in Belfast, although bricks were thrown through the windows of two houses. A fire was started in a roundabout in Newtownabbey, whilst in Coleraine an arson attack was being investigated as a hate crime.

=== 13 June ===
On 13 June, police said they were investigating multiple reports of racist graffiti across Bangor as racially motivated hate crimes. Violence continued in Portadown as police were attacked with fireworks, petrol bombs and masonry; two people were arrested and police used a water cannon to maintain order. There was also disorder in the Tullyally area of Derry, where one arrest was made and a police vehicle damaged. In Newry, playing fields and properties were damaged when a group began to start fires, with one teenage boy being arrested. Stones were thrown at the windows of a hotel in Newtownabbey and a car was set on fire in Belfast; police said the latter was being treated as a racially motivated hate crime.

=== 14 June ===
On 14 June, there were some sporadic incidents around Northern Ireland, however disorder was on a much smaller scale than in previous days. Police received reports of a group throwing bottles at some properties in Lurgan, leading to the arrest of two boys aged 12 and 14 who were later released on bail. A man was arrested in Carrickfergus after an incident of attempted criminal damage to a vehicle. An anti-racism rally was held at Belfast City Hall to show support for migrants in the country.

=== 15 June ===
On 15 June, police reported sporadic incidents of disorder and said there had been a reduced level of disorder for the second consecutive night. In Ardoyne, a group of about 30 people set a wheelie bin on fire however there was no damage to any shops and the PSNI said no serious disorder ensued. They also said that incidents of graffiti in Bangor and Belfast were being investigated as racially motivated hate crimes.

=== 16 June ===
On 16 June, there were heightened levels of disorder compared to previous nights, namely in Derry. Largely peaceful protests took place in Ballymena and parts of Belfast. In the Nailors Row area of Derry, police were attacked with masonry and fireworks, leaving three officers injured. Two teenage boys, aged 13 and 18, were arrested on suspicion of riotous behaviour and were released on bail, with police confirming the disorder in Derry was not racially motivated. There were also incidents of masked people attempting to attack homes in the nearby Fountain Estate. Gary Middleton, the MLA for Foyle, described the disorder as "wholly sectarian".

=== 17 June ===
On 17 June, a second night of rioting in Derry saw increased violence in the Nailors Row area, with bricks, fireworks, masonry, petrol bombs and planks of wood thrown at police. The disorder, which was described as "blatant sectarian violence" by chief constable Jon Boutcher, left 14 police officers injured as 11 people were arrested. One rioter was hit by a baton round as he ran towards police with a lit petrol bomb.

=== 18 June ===
On 18 June, there were lower levels of disorder with some incidents reported in the Galliagh area of Derry. A number of items including bins, pallets, plastic barriers, a sofa and tyres were dragged onto roads and set on fire, whilst a traffic light was left inoperable after being set alight.

== Aftermath ==
According to a local estimate, of the 1,200 Roma who lived in Ballymena before the riots, two thirds were reported to have left. The Guardian reported, "The rioters, after all, got what they wanted. They won."

In November 2025, prosecutors confirmed that the charges against the two teenage boys were dropped after new evidence meant the case no longer met the threshold for prosecution.

== See also ==
- List of riots in Northern Ireland
- 2021 Northern Ireland riots
- 2023 Dublin riot
- 2024 United Kingdom riots
- 2026 Northern Ireland riots
