= Augustus Anwyl-Passingham =

British military officer (1880–1955)

Colonel Augustus Anwyl-Passingham CBE DL JP
- Birth name: Augustus Mervyn Owen Anwyl Passingham
- Born: 31 August 1880 Dover, Kent
- Died: 22 November 1955 (aged 75)
- Allegiance: United Kingdom
- Branch: Territorial Army

Colonel Augustus Mervyn Owen Anwyl Anwyl-Passingham CBE DL JP (31 August 1880 – 22 November 1955) was a British soldier, recruiting officer and Territorial Army organiser.

== Early life and family ==
Born in 1880 in Dover, Anwyl-Passingham belonged to a family of Anglo-Welsh gentry. He was the second and youngest son of Major Robert Townshend Passingham, JP, DL (1843–1893), of Bala, Merionethshire, and his wife Lucy Emma (d. 1909), eldest daughter of Thomas Jeffreys Badger of Kingsland, Shropshire. In 1888, his father assumed the additional name of Anwyl. His elder brother was the soldier Robert Townshend Anwyl-Passingham, OBE (1867–1926), and two of his sisters married Italian noblemen.

== Career ==
=== Military ===
Anwyl-Passingham was educated at Dover College, and joined the 3rd (Militia) battalion of The Middlesex Regiment as a second lieutenant on 20 December 1899. He transferred to the regular army as a second lieutenant in the 2nd battalion of the regiment on 14 September 1901, and served with the battalion in the Second Boer War (1901–02), staying in South Africa with the battalion after the end of the war (June 1902), until they left Cape Town for Southampton on the SS Staffordshire in January 1903. He was promoted to a lieutenant in 1903. Between 1905 and 1907, he was part of the Royal West African Frontier Force and in 1906 participated in the Hadeija and Sokoto expeditions in Nigeria. Returning to the United Kingdom thereafter, he was wounded in 1907 during rioting in Ireland. Promoted to captain in 1911, he was appointed a recruiting staff officer for the London Recruiting Area in 1913 and remained in that post after the onset of the First World War.

In January 1916, he was appointed a staff captain in the War Office with the temporary rank of major; he was promoted to the full rank in July 1916, and in September he was appointed an assistant inspector of registration and recruiting in the War Office. He was made a deputy director of recruiting with responsibility for Wales and was promoted to temporary colonel in August 1917; he was appointed an Officer of the Order of the British Empire (OBE) in the 1918 New Year Honours for his services.

Anwyl-Passingham left that post and the temporary rank in May 1918, and was "recalled to the colours". According to his obituary in The Times, he served in Italy and was mentioned in dispatches. After the war, he served in Upper Silesia between 1919 and 1921, helping to oversee the preparations for its transfer to Poland. He was promoted to colonel and retired in August 1922.

=== Retirement and later life ===
In 1924, Anwyl-Passingham became secretary of the Middlesex Territorial Army and Air Force Association, serving until 1945. He was appointed a deputy lieutenant for Middlesex in 1927 and served as the county's high sheriff in 1938. In the 1942 New Year Honours, he was advanced to Commander of the Order of the British Empire (CBE). He died on November 22, 1955.
