= OVIK Cameleon IV440 Modular Mission Vehicle =

OVIK CAMELEON IV440
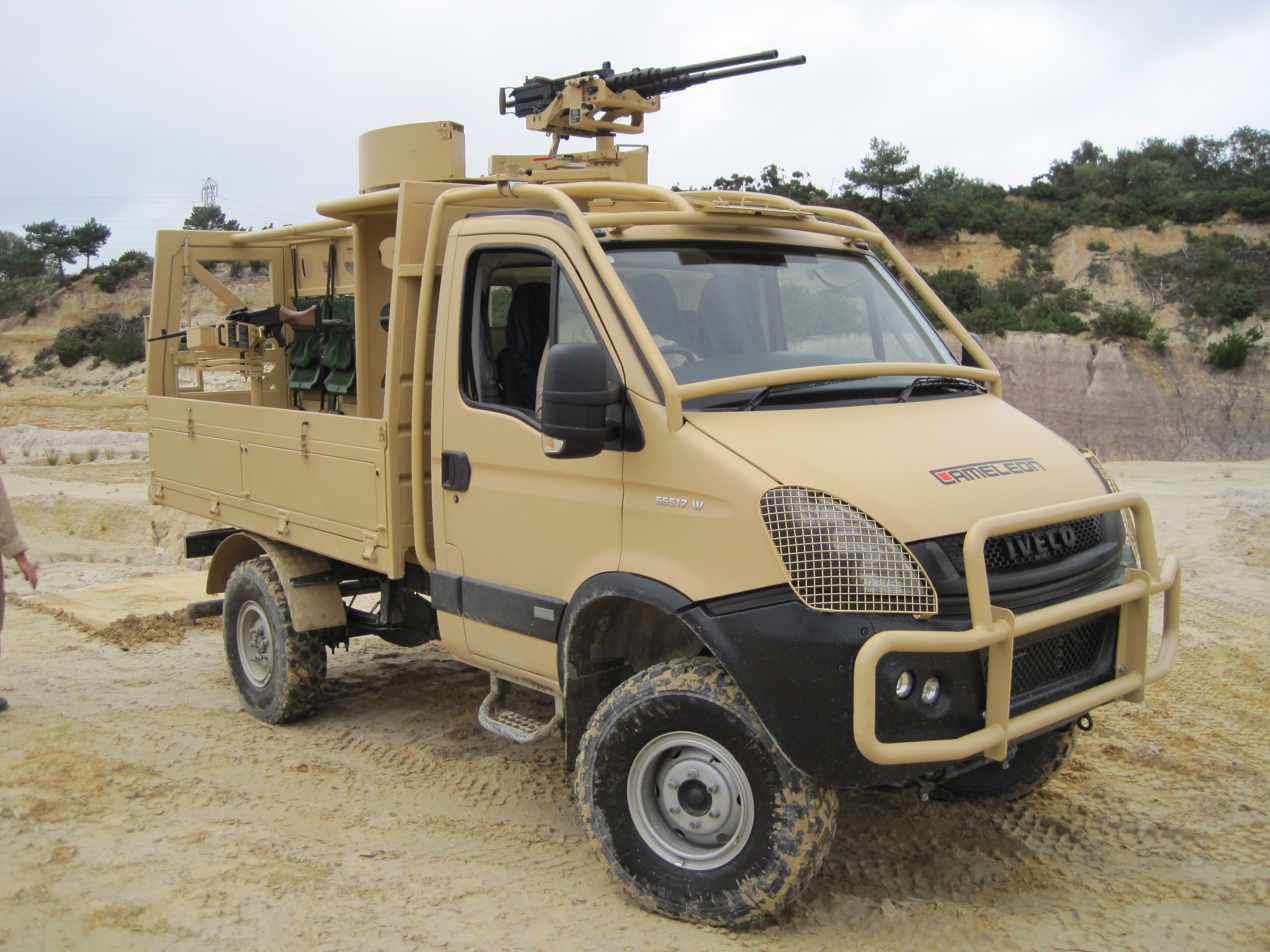
- OVIK CAMELEON IV440 Modular Mission Vehicle with Patrol Module.
- Type: Modular Mission Vehicle
- Place of origin: United Kingdom

Service history
- Used by: United Kingdom, France, New Zealand

Production history
- Designer: OVIK Group

Specifications
- Mass: 5.5 tonnes (GVW)
- Length: 5432 mm
- Width: 2016 mm
- Height: 2900 mm (front cab, including self-defence weapon)
- Crew: Driver + 2 passengers (front car), up to 10 passengers (rear car) - depending upon module
- Main armament: 7.62 mm light machine gun on swing mount
- Secondary armament: Various weapon mix including 5.56 mm / 7.62 mm / 12.7 mm (.50 cal) / 40 mm grenade launcher
- Engine: Iveco 3.0 litre in-line four-cylinder turbocharged diesel. Engine power 202 kW (176 hp)
- Payload capacity: 3.0 tonnes

The Cameleon IV440 is a four-wheel drive modular mission system vehicle designed by Jez Hermer MBE, CEO of OVIK Special Vehicles. Designed and developed in 2010, it is based upon the second generation Iveco Daily 4x4 chassis but incorporates a number of modifications designed by OVIK plus a range of specialist mission modules which can be interchanged rapidly.

== Concept of use ==
The general concept behind the Cameleon system is to provide military forces, civil and emergency services and commercial users with a modular vehicle which can be rapidly reconfigured into a range of configurations.

== Size and specifications ==
The OVIK Chameleon is around 5.4 meters long 2 meters wide and weights 5.5 tons. It can hold at maximum 13 people. it has a wheel base of 3.9 meters and a 0.9 meter overhang.

=== weaponry ===
The vehicles are fitted with 7.62mm light machine gun main armament on the swing mount. They can be fitted with secondary armaments including 5.56mm, 7.62mm, 12.7mm (.50 cal) and 40 mm grenade launchers. The vehicles also provide self defense capability for the crew.
