= Shorland armoured car =

Shorland Internal Security Vehicle
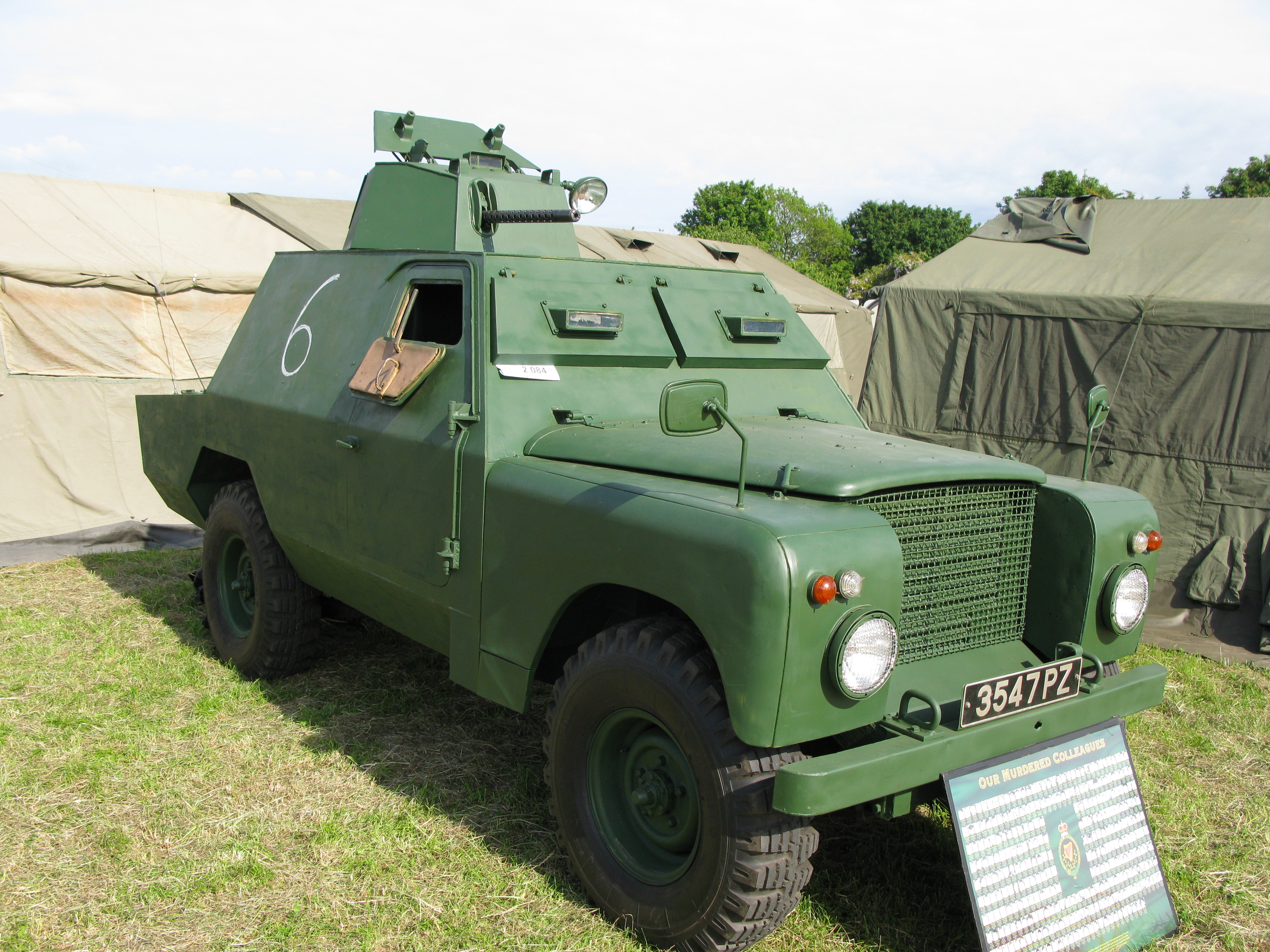
- A Mk1 Shorland Internal Security Vehicle
- Type: Armoured car
- Place of origin: United Kingdom

Service history
- In service: Royal Ulster Constabulary; Ulster Defence Regiment
- Wars: The Troubles; Lebanese Civil War; Rhodesian Bush War; Second Malayan Emergency; Internal conflict in Burma; Sri Lankan Civil War; First Libyan Civil War

Production history
- Manufacturer: Short Brothers and Harland

Specifications
- Length: 4.60 m (15 ft 1 in)
- Width: 1.78 m (5 ft 10 in)
- Height: 2.29 m (7 ft 6 in)
- Crew: 3
- Main armament: 7.62×51mm NATO machine gun
- Engine: Rover petrol 91 hp (68 kW)
- Suspension: 4 X 4
- Operational range: 260–510 km (160–320 mi)
- Maximum speed: 88 km/h (55 mph)

The Shorland is an armoured patrol car that was designed specifically for the Royal Ulster Constabulary by Frederick Butler. The first design meeting took place in November 1961. The third and final prototype was completed in 1964 and the first RUC Shorlands were delivered in 1966. They were reallocated to the Ulster Defence Regiment in 1970. The Royal Ulster Constabulary soon replaced the Shorland with an armoured Land Rover with more conventional profile and no machine gun turret.

The vehicles were built by Short Brothers and Harland of Belfast using the chassis from the Series IIA Land Rover.

By the nineties, the Land Rover Tangi, designed and built by the Royal Ulster Constabulary's own vehicle engineering team, was by far the most common model of armoured Land Rover.

Shorts and Harland continued to develop the original Shorland from an armoured patrol car with a crew of three to an armoured personnel vehicle, capable of carrying two up front and six in the rear; a small number of these were used on the streets in Northern Ireland as late as 1998.

In 1996, the Short Brothers sold the complete Shorland design to British Aerospace Australia.

They were also used by the RAF Police in Germany in the 1990s for Special Weapons (Nuclear) escort duties.

== Design ==
The Shorland is a long wheelbase Land Rover with the turret similar in appearance to that of a Mk 2 Ferret scout car. The vehicle has upgraded suspension to deal with the extra weight of the armour.

== August 1969 deployment ==
In August 1969 widespread sectarian violence and street unrest broke out in Northern Ireland, set against the backdrop of the ongoing Northern Ireland civil rights movement. In response the RUC deployed Shorland armored cars in Belfast, initially in a crowd control role. On 14 August an IRA unit opened fire on RUC officers and loyalist militants gathered at the intersection of Dover and Divis Street, at the edge of the predominantly Catholic district. Protestant Herbert Roy (26) was killed and three officers were wounded. Police responded with bursts from Sterling submachine guns. At this point, the RUC, misinterpreting the unrest as an IRA uprising, deployed the Shorlands in a live-fire role, and their .30 calibre bullets reportedly "tore through walls as if they were cardboard". In response to the RUC coming under fire at Divis Street, three Shorlands were requested. The Shorlands came under fire, and were also attacked with an explosive device and petrol bombs. The RUC believed that the shots had come from the Divis Flats complex. RUC officers inside the Shorlands opened fire with their turret-mounted machine-guns. At least thirteen Divis flats were recorded struck in the hail of gunfire. A nine-year-old boy, Patrick Rooney, was killed instantly by Shorland machine-gun fire as he lay in bed in one of the flats. He was the first child fatality during the violence.

The Republican Labour Party MP for Belfast Central, Paddy Kennedy, who was in the vicinity, phoned RUC headquarters and pleaded with Northern Ireland Minister for Home Affairs, Robert Porter, for the Shorlands to be withdrawn and the shooting to cease. Porter responded that this was impossible as "the whole town is in rebellion". Porter told Kennedy that Donegall Street police station was under heavy machine-gun fire when in fact it was undisturbed during the entirety of the unrest. Following the shooting of Catholic man Hugh McCabe in the Divis complex, a mob of 200 loyalists attacked Divis Street and began burning Catholic homes there. Six IRA members in St Comgall's School opened fire with rifle and submachinegun fire, repelling the invasion and wounding eight. Shortly afterwards an RUC Shorland appeared and opened fire on the school, but the IRA unit returned fire and escaped.

The Scarman Tribunal later commissioned by the UK Government to investigate the Northern Ireland violence of August 1969 was highly critical of the RUC's deployment of Shorland armoured cars:

The use of Browning machine-guns in Belfast on 14 August and 15 August... was a menace to the innocent as well as the guilty, being heavy and indiscriminate in its fire: and on one occasion (the firing into St Brendan's block of flats where the boy Rooney was killed) its use was wholly unjustifiable

== Variants ==
=== Mk 1 ===
- 67 bhp (50 kW) engine

=== Mk 2 ===
- 77 bhp (57 kW) engine

=== Mk 3 ===
- Introduced in 1972
- 91 bhp (68 kW) engine
- Thicker armour than Mk 1, Mk 2

=== Mk 4 ===
- Production started in 1980
- 3.5 litre Rover V8 petrol engine
- Improved armour over Mk 3

=== Series 5 ===
- Based on the Defender 110 chassis
- 3.5 litre Rover V8 petrol engine or 2.5 litre Rover Tdi Turbo diesel engine
- Welded armour fully enclosed body.
- Versions
  - S5 - Prototype Armoured Patrol Car
  - S51 - Armoured Patrol Car
  - S52 - Armoured Patrol Car
  - S53 - Air Defence Vehicle
  - S54 - Anti-hijack Vehicle
  - S55 - Armoured Personnel Carrier (APC)

== Current and former operators ==
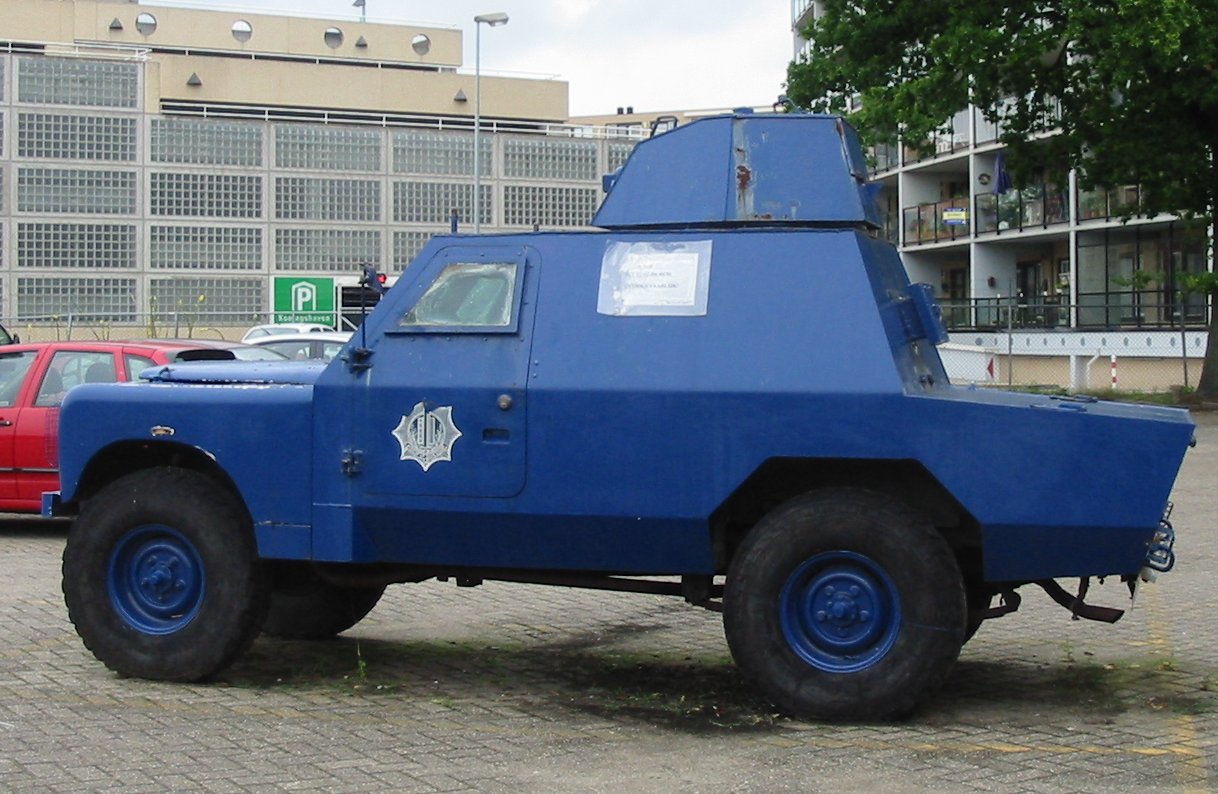
Former Netherlands Police vehicle

- Argentina: 20
- Bahrain: 2
- Botswana: 10
- Brunei: 15
- Burundi: 7
- Guyana: 5
- Iraq: 72
- Kenya: 8
- Lebanon - 30 in service with the Internal Security Forces.
- Lesotho: 8
- Libya: 15
- Malaysia: 20 (retired service)
- Mauritius: 4
- Nigeria - Some of local manufacture.
- Netherlands
- Pakistan - 24 in service with the Sindh Police.
- Papua New Guinea - 5
- Portugal - 38 in service with the Portuguese Republican National Guard.
- Rhodesia - Unlicensed variant; 2 were built and deployed for the Selous Scouts in 1979.
- Saudi Arabia: 40
- Seychelles: 8
- Syria: 4
- Sri Lanka
- Thailand: 32
- Turkey: 100 in service with the Gendarmerie as Otokar Akrep.
- United Arab Emirates: 6 acquired by the Sharjah National Guard in 1972, transferred to the Federal Police in 1976.
- United Kingdom
- Venezuela: 15
- Kuwait: Kuwait national guard and the Kuwait police force

== See also ==
- Shorland S600, an armoured personnel carrier developed in 1995 based on the Mercedes-Benz Unimog
