= Black Mountain (District Electoral Area) =

District Electoral Area in Belfast, Northern Ireland

- Belfast City Council DEA constituency
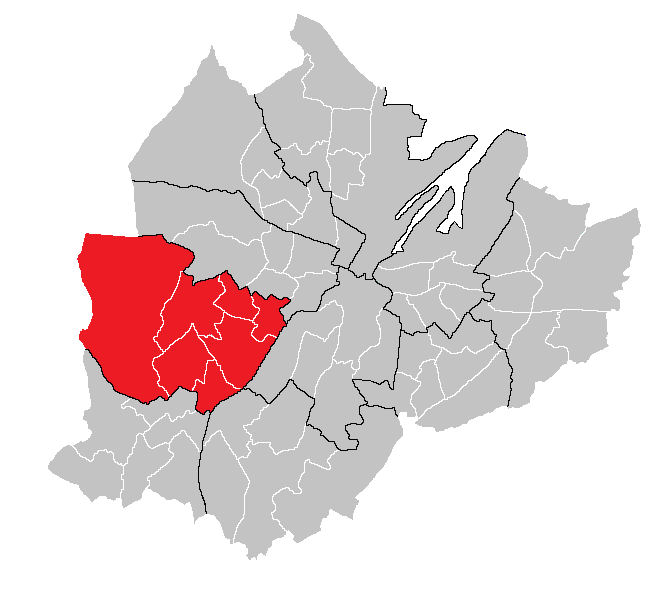
- Black Mountain DEA marked on a map of Belfast City Council and its wards

Current constituency
- Created: 2014
- Seats: 7 (2014–)
- Councillors: Ciarán Beattie (SF); Arder Carson (SF); Paul Doherty (IND); Micheal Donnelly (SF); Róis-Máire Donnelly (SF); Áine McCabe (SF); Ronan McLaughlin (SF)

Black Mountain is a District Electoral Area used to elect 7 councillors to Belfast City Council.

It is named after the Black Mountain.

The district was created for the 2014 election. It combined 4 of the 6 wards from the abolished Upper Falls DEA with 3 of the 5 wards from the abolished Lower Falls DEA.

In the 2014 election it elected 5 Sinn Féin councillors, 1 Social Democratic and Labour Party councillor, and Gerry Carroll of the People Before Profit Alliance. In the 2019 election Sinn Fein gained a sixth seat from the SDLP. In the 2023 election, the SDLP regained a seat at the expense of People Before Profit.

== Councillors ==
Election	Councillor (Party)	Councillor (Party)	Councillor (Party)	Councillor (Party)	Councillor (Party)	Councillor (Party)	Councillor (Party)
April 2026 Defection	Ciarán Beattie (Sinn Féin)	Arder Carson (Sinn Féin)	Róis-Máire Donnelly (Sinn Féin)	Áine McCabe (Sinn Féin)	Micheal Donnelly (Sinn Féin)	Ronan McLaughlin (Sinn Féin)	Paul Doherty (Independent)/ (SDLP)
2023	Ciarán Beattie (Sinn Féin)	Arder Carson (Sinn Féin)	Róis-Máire Donnelly (Sinn Féin)	Áine McCabe (Sinn Féin)	Micheal Donnelly (Sinn Féin)	Ronan McLaughlin (Sinn Féin)	Paul Doherty (Independent)/ (SDLP)
November 2022 Co-Option	Ciarán Beattie (Sinn Féin)	Arder Carson (Sinn Féin)	Róis-Máire Donnelly (Sinn Féin)	Áine McCabe (Sinn Féin)	Micheal Donnelly (Sinn Féin)	Ronan McLaughlin (Sinn Féin)	Matt Collins (PBP)
November 2020 Co-Option	Ciarán Beattie (Sinn Féin)	Arder Carson (Sinn Féin)	Steven Corr (Sinn Féin)	Áine McCabe (Sinn Féin)	Micheal Donnelly (Sinn Féin)	Ronan McLaughlin (Sinn Féin)	Matt Collins (PBP)
2019	Ciarán Beattie (Sinn Féin)	Arder Carson (Sinn Féin)	Steven Corr (Sinn Féin)	Emma Groves (Sinn Féin)	Micheal Donnelly (Sinn Féin)	Ronan McLaughlin (Sinn Féin)	Matt Collins (PBP)
October 2017 Co-Option	Ciarán Beattie (Sinn Féin)	Arder Carson (Sinn Féin)	Steven Corr (Sinn Féin)	Emma Groves (Sinn Féin)	Orla Nic Biorna (Sinn Féin)	Tim Attwood (SDLP)	Matt Collins (PBP)
May 2016 Co-Option	Ciarán Beattie (Sinn Féin)	Arder Carson (Sinn Féin)	Steven Corr (Sinn Féin)	Emma Groves (Sinn Féin)	Janice Austin (Sinn Féin)	Tim Attwood (SDLP)	Matt Collins (PBP)
2014	Ciarán Beattie (Sinn Féin)	Arder Carson (Sinn Féin)	Steven Corr (Sinn Féin)	Emma Groves (Sinn Féin)	Janice Austin (Sinn Féin)	Tim Attwood (SDLP)	Gerry Carroll (PBP)

== 2023 results ==
2019: 6 x Sinn Féin, 1 x People Before Profit

2023: 6 x Sinn Féin, 1 x SDLP

2019–2023 Change: SDLP gain from People Before Profit

Black Mountain - 7 seats
Party	Candidate	FPv%	Count							
Party	Candidate	FPv%	1	2	3	4	5	6	7	8
Sinn Féin	Ciarán Beattie*	14.63%	2,336							
Sinn Féin	Michael Donnelly*	13.51%	2,158							
Sinn Féin	Arder Carson*	12.98%	2,073							
Sinn Féin	Ronan McLaughlin*	10.27%	1,641	1,867.24	1,983.65	1,986.65	2,037.59			
SDLP	Paul Doherty ‡	10.55%	1,685	1,700.96	1,706.77	1,718.05	1,720.72	1,838.15	2,029.15	
Sinn Féin	Áine McCabe*	11.51%	1,838	1,848.50	1,853.12	1,860.40	1,862.65	1,897.79	2,005.79	
Sinn Féin	Róis-Máire Donnelly*	9.62%	1,536	1,575.06	1,589.29	1,594.27	1,597.66	1,643.84	1,730.09	1,762.61
People Before Profit	Matt Collins*	8.24%	1,316	1,330.14	1,334.13	1,353.13	1,354.57	1,446.13	1,660.80	1,661.40
Aontú	Gerard Herdman	3.40%	543	544.96	545.66	547.66	547.90	563.18		
Irish Republican Socialist	Dan Murphy	2.67%	426	429.78	431.53	432.53	432.71	454.51		
Workers' Party	Ursula Meighan	1.16%	185	186.82	188.36	188.36	188.54			
Alliance	Ryan Brown	1.04%	166	171.04	171.39	185.53	185.86			
Green (NI)	Stevie Maginn	0.43%	68	68.70	68.77					
Electorate: 27,143 Valid: 15,971 (58.84%) Spoilt: 309 Quota: 1,997 Turnout: 16,280 (59.98%)

== 2019 results ==
2014: 5 x Sinn Féin, 1 x People Before Profit, 1 x SDLP

2019: 6 x Sinn Féin, 1 x People Before Profit

2014-2019 Change: Sinn Féin gain from SDLP

Black Mountain - 7 seats
Party	Candidate	FPv%	Count					
Party	Candidate	FPv%	1	2	3	4	5	6
People Before Profit	Matt Collins*	16.14%	2,268					
Sinn Féin	Ciarán Beattie*	13.47%	1,893					
Sinn Féin	Steven Corr*	13.26%	1,864					
Sinn Féin	Arder Carson*	11.63%	1,634	1,686.78	1,710.65	1,715.95	1,773.95	
Sinn Féin	Micheal Donnelly	10.92%	1,535	1,569.32	1,572.82	1,583.57	1,623.65	1,667.66
Sinn Féin	Ronan McLaughlin	9.36%	1,316	1,354.22	1,444.87	1,510.07	1,567.35	1,614.95
Sinn Féin	Emma Groves*	10.18%	1,431	1,465.32	1,470.43	1,473.98	1,520.58	1,590.64
SDLP	Paul Doherty	5.57%	783	903.9	906.35	908.05	1,175.18	1,432.89
Aontú	Eoin Geraghty	5.34%	750	796.02	797	797.9	861.98	
Green (NI)	Stevie Maginn	1.45%	204	282	283.05	283.8		
Alliance	Liam Norris	1.52%	213	256.16	256.93	257.43		
Workers' Party	Conor Campbell	1.15%	162	210.88	213.05	214.45		
Electorate: 26,022 Valid: 14,053 (54.00%) Spoilt: 345 Quota: 1,757 Turnout: 14,398 (55.33%)

== 2014 results ==
2014: 5 x Sinn Féin, 1 x People Before Profit, 1 x SDLP

Black Mountain - 7 seats
Party	Candidate	FPv%	Count						
Party	Candidate	FPv%	1	2	3	4	5	6	7
Sinn Féin	Steven Corr*	12.86%	1,793						
Sinn Féin	Janice Austin*	12.80%	1,784						
People Before Profit	Gerry Carroll	12.13%	1,691	1,789					
Sinn Féin	Emma Groves*	11.68%	1,628	1,637	1,757				
Sinn Féin	Arder Carson*	10.82%	1,509	1,527	1,628	1,629.68	1,634.18	1,636.12	1,641.44
SDLP	Tim Attwood*	9.02%	1,258	1,452	1,596	1,597.18	1,631.68	1,632.72	1,634.26
Sinn Féin	Ciarán Beattie*	9.61%	1,340	1,369	1,472	1,501.46	1,504.46	1,534.22	1,538.14
Sinn Féin	Caoimhín Mhic Giolla Mhin*	10.24%	1,428	1,450	1,521	1,522.3	1,526.05	1,527.19	1,529.71
éirígí	Pádraic MacCoitir	7.36%	1,026	1,040					
Workers' Party	Joanne Lowry	1.14%	159						
SDLP	Gerard McDonald	0.95%	133						
Alliance	Lauren Gray	0.79%	110						
NI21	Chris Valente	0.60%	83						
Electorate: 25,146 Valid: 13,942 (55.44%) Spoilt: 369 Quota: 1,743 Turnout: 14,311 (56.91%)
