= Robert Townshend Anwyl-Passingham =

English military officer (1867–1926)

Robert Townshend Anwyl-Passingham OBE DL JP
- Born: Robert Townshend Passingham; 16 October 1867; London, England, UK
- Died: 10 June 1926 (aged 58); North Wales, UK
- Education: Bedford Modern School
- Spouse: Charlotte Angie Bigoe (m. 1906)

Robert Townshend Anwyl-Passingham OBE DL JP (16 October 1867 – 10 June 1926) was Deputy Inspector-General of Military Police in Burma and Double Company Commander of the 72nd Punjabis. He retired in 1907 but during World War I served as assistant director of Recruiting in Wrexham and later assistant director of National Service for North Wales; for his wartime service he was made OBE. A prominent figure in Merionethshire, Anwyl-Passingham served as a JP, DL, and, in 1925, as High sheriff of that county.

== Life ==
Robert Townshend Passingham was born in London on 16 October 1867, the son of Major Robert Townshend Anwyl-Passingham, DL, JP, of Bryn-e-groes, Merioneth. His younger brother, Augustus (1880–1955), was a soldier. Two of his sisters married Italian noblemen.

He was educated at Bedford Modern School and Sandhurst, and changed his surname to Anwyl-Passingham by deed poll on 8 October 1888.

Anwyl-Passingham was commissioned as a lieutenant in the South Wales Borderers on 30 January 1886 and served with the Burmese Expedition between 1886 and 1889 (medal with clasps). He joined the Madras Staff Corps of the Indian Army on 4 March 1888 and was appointed wing officer; he served again in Burma between 1889 and 1892 with the 12th Mounted Infantry (Burma Battalion). In January 1892, he was made station commander (3rd Class) at Hakha and attained the rank of captain in January 1897.

In 1898, Anwyl-Passingham became commandant of the Mogaung Battalion, Burma Military Police, and in 1900 officiated as Deputy Inspector-General of Military Police in Burma. He spent the remainder of his career with the 72nd Punjabis as a major and Double Company Commander. He retired in 1907.

During World War I, Anwyl-Passingham was assistant director of recruiting in Wrexham and later assistant director of national service for North Wales; for his wartime service he was appointed Officer of the Order of the British Empire (OBE) in the 1918 Birthday Honours. A prominent figure in Merionethshire, he served as JP, DL, and in 1925, as High Sheriff of the county.

On 7 January 1906, Anwyl-Passignham married Charlotte Angie Bigoe. He died in North Wales on 10 June 1926, aged 58.
