= Land Rover Tangi =

Type of armoured vehicle

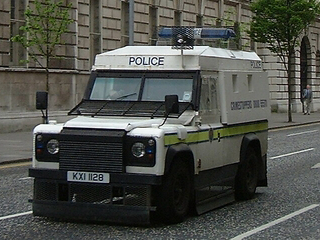
Land Rover Tangi passing Belfast City Hall, sporting the old livery of the Royal Ulster Constabulary

The Land Rover Tangi was a type of armoured vehicle, based on the Land Rover chassis and used in policing in Northern Ireland. They were used by the Royal Ulster Constabulary (RUC) and by its replacement, the Police Service of Northern Ireland (PSNI). The vehicle was designed and built in house by the Royal Ulster Constabulary's own engineers.

== History of armoured Land Rovers in Northern Ireland ==
Due to the Troubles in Northern Ireland, the RUC had long used armoured vehicles to provide protection to its officers. The first to be based on the Land Rover appeared in 1957, based on a Series I 109 in (2,800 mm) wheelbase pick-up body. This incorporated only a basic level of protection, designed to defend against bricks and bottles in a public order situation. An expanded metal cage was fitted over the rear cargo bed and lined with hardboard to prevent sharp objects being thrust through the cage. Similar expanded metal grilles protected the windows and headlights on the vehicle to prevent them being broken by thrown projectiles.

However, it was not long before the police came under attack with firearms; against which the cages and hardboard of the early Land Rovers provided no protection. Plates of ballistic steel were added to each side of the rear cargo bed and an armoured steel door was fitted to the rear. Whilst this provided a greater degree of protection from low velocity weapons, there were many areas of the vehicle which were still unprotected. The RUC realised that a fresh design was required to protect their officers.

The result was the Hotspur Land Rover, named after the brand of armour plate made in Wales used in its construction. The chassis of a civilian Land Rover 109 station wagon was used. Underneath the standard aluminium roof a second roof, fabricated from armoured steel, was installed. This provided overhead protection from gunfire, petrol bombs and IEDs. Large plates of ballistic steel were bolted to the sides of the vehicle, which wrapped around the rear pillar and met with an armoured double door. Both of these doors and the side plates were fitted with sliding pistol ports, allowing the officers inside to return fire in the event of an ambush. The rear doors, sides and roof constituted an armoured box providing all round protection to the crew in the rear of the vehicle. For the protection of the driver and the front seat passenger, the windscreen and side windows were replaced with thick sheets of bulletproof glass, along with armour-plated doors. Finally, a fabricated (not expanded) metal grille could be pulled up over the windscreen to prevent the windscreen being broken by thrown objects during civil disorder, and the side windows covered with a sheet of transparent polycarbonate for the same purpose.

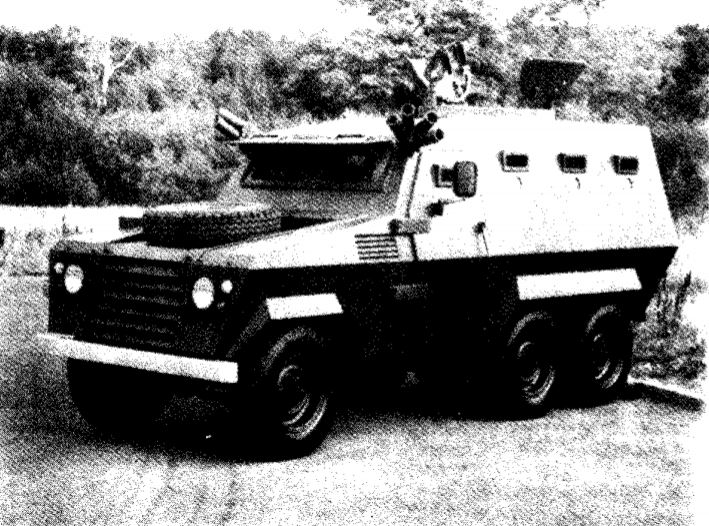
Six-wheeled model of the Hotspur armoured personnel carrier, 1987.

The Hotspur was immediately put into action and worked admirably. Myriad modifications were carried out over the years, including lining the vehicles' lower panels with sheets of polycarbonate to prevent the body panels from being dented during civil disorder. Metal grilles and rubber skirts were fitted around the lower perimeter of the vehicle to prevent projectiles being thrown under the body at officers who were sheltering behind, and also to prevent beer kegs being rolled under the vehicle in an attempt to immobilise it.

By the end of 1983, 151 Hotspurs had also been fitted with a fire extinguishing system operated by the front seat passenger. In the event of the vehicle being hit by a petrol bomb, as was not uncommon during civil disorder, a dashboard button was pressed. This caused the heater blower and engine fan to switch off, and a fire extinguisher was automatically discharged through a series of pipes into the engine bay and over the windscreen and bonnet.

The Hotspur was complemented by a more advanced armoured Land Rover called the Simba. This, rather than being a civilian Land Rover with armour bolted on, was a chassis which was fitted with a purpose built armoured steel body providing 360-degree protection against high velocity rifle fire, bricks, bottles, petrol bombs and small improvised explosive devices.

However, due to the Simba's advanced and purpose built nature it was very slow to produce and the Hotspur Land Rovers were beginning to wear out, so a solution was needed to quickly get more armoured police vehicles on the streets. The answer was the Land Rover Tangi, a name derived from the Swahili tangi, meaning "tank."

== The Tangi ==
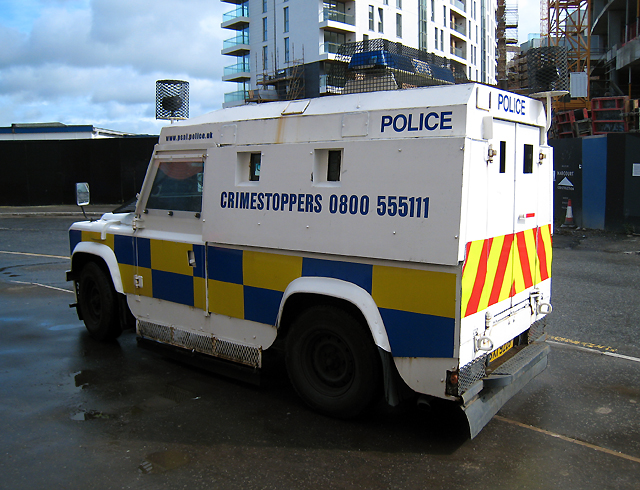
A Land Rover Tangi

Armour kits from retired Hotspurs were fitted onto brand-new Land Rover Defender 110 civilian chassis. When donor kits ran out, the RUC workshops began to fabricate brand-new ones. The vehicles' headlights were initially protected from damage by transparent polycarbonate shields, but these were quickly found to be less durable than the original metal grilles of the Hotspur and were replaced. At the front and rear of the roof each of the Tangis were fitted with a remotely controlled spotlight and a rotating blue warning light, all protected by expanded metal grilles. The Hotspur's side skirts were retained, as was its fire protection system. In addition, burning petrol was prevented from entering the engine bay by a fabric strip around the bonnet edge and at the hinge between the bonnet and the front bulkhead. Further, the engine radiator was protected from damage with a substantial louvred grille fabricated from 3 mm steel sheet.

The first Tangi (registration HXI 3593, fleet number 8203) went into action on 16 January 1986. Crews were very welcoming of the Tangi and much preferred it to the Hotspur, mainly thanks to its power steering, coil spring suspension, disc brakes and factory air conditioning which the Hotspur lacked, and that it was impervious to most of the weapons encountered during civil disorder.

The use of a drogue bomb which damaged the roof of one vehicle during rioting at Dawson Street in Belfast led to the developing of the 'Dawson' roof. The crew of the Land Rover were saved from serious injury as they had packed riot shields using ropes above their heads forming a second skin. The roofs now effectively were designed with a second steel roof mounted over the first and works similar to spaced armour, detonating the IED before it struck the main armoured roof. Vehicles fitted with the Dawson roof were easily identified due to its large, angular appearance.

Similar IEDs were fitted with small drogues on the rear, so they could be thrown horizontally to strike the side of a Tangi thus circumventing the additional roof armour. The RUC responded to this with a similar measure to the Dawson roof, fitting a plate of ballistic steel several inches from the hull to detonate the bomb before it struck the main armoured body. Fitted with the Dawson roof and hardened side armour, this variant of the Tangi was the most common on the streets of Northern Ireland.

== Operational use ==
Tangis were known to the local population as 'Meat Wagons'. This name comes from the police being called 'pigs' and from other armoured vehicles used by the British Army in Northern Ireland, such as the Humber Pig. The vehicles were synonymous with Northern Ireland's Troubles. At the height of the Troubles the vehicles were essential for patrolling across Northern Ireland, carrying two police officers in the front and a maximum of five officers wearing riot helmets and carrying shields in the rear. At this time they were painted in battleship grey livery. One person, Alan McCormick, a Protestant civilian, was killed after being hit by one of the vehicles during the Troubles, during a riot situation in Ballysillan in 1986.

Since the Good Friday Agreement, the vehicles were largely used for crowd control, though some were used for patrol purposes in areas where dissident paramilitaries still operate. Before its dissolution, the RUC began painting some of their Tangis into a high-visibility white livery featuring yellow and green 'jam sandwich'-style markings, later superseded under the PSNI by yellow and blue Battenburg markings. The original rotating blue beacons were replaced with full-width light bars and small blue strobes fitted to the front grille.

=== Status ===
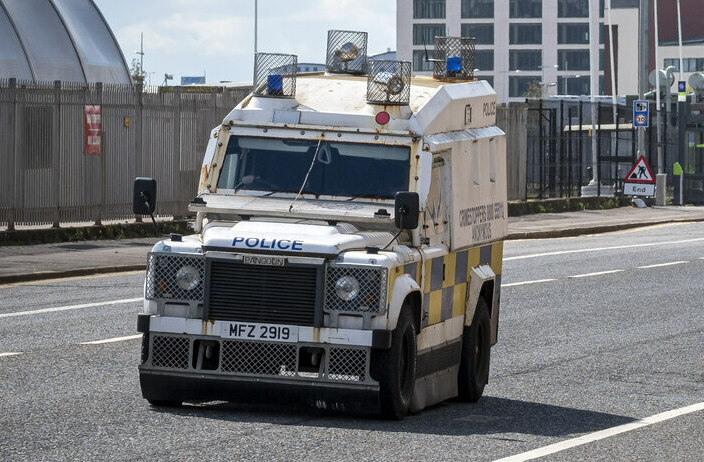
PSNI OVIK Pangolin on Queen's Road, Belfast, April 2023

More than half of the former RUC (now PSNI) fleet of 450 armoured Land Rovers were decommissioned under the terms of the Good Friday Agreement. Twelve were loaned by the RUC to the Belgian Gendarmerie to combat football hooliganism during the Euro 2000 football tournament, in exchange for the RUC's loan of two Gendarmerie water cannons in 1999 during the Drumcree conflict, while a number, mainly Tangis, were exported to Great Britain for refurbishment and distribution among regional police services. North Wales Police are known to operate Tangis, South Yorkshire Police have three, and after the 2001 Bradford riots, West Yorkshire Police purchased six from the RUC.

In 2011, it was announced that some of the ageing Tangi fleet were to be replaced in response to officer safety concerns following the 2010 Northern Ireland riots. After gradual replacement by newer models on Land Rover Defender chassis such as the OVIK PANGOLIN Public Order Land Rover (Mk 1 & 2) and the Penman Public Order Land Rover, the PSNI confirmed in November 2025 that they have retired all of their remaining Land Rover Tangis.

The vehicle has become popular with collectors. Die-cast models and artwork of the vehicles are available, and replica RUC Tangis have also been produced. Twelve former PSNI Tangis adapted for film use were loaned to the producers of BBC police drama Blue Lights for a fee of £150 per vehicle.

== The Hotspur Hussar ==
The Hotspur Hussar is a military armoured personnel carrier designed in 1984 and based upon the Land Rover Hotspur and Tangi. It features a third driven axle to provide a 6x6 configuration and is capable of carrying a crew of two plus ten fully equipped soldiers over rugged terrain. Up to six gun ports may be provided, three on each side of the vehicle through which the occupants can fire at an enemy. The Hotspur Hussar was exported to Egypt and Sri Lanka.

== See also ==
- Snatch Land Rover – similar vehicle used by the Army during The Troubles
- Shorland – Land Rover-based armoured car
