= 2026 Northern Ireland riots =

Riots in Northern Ireland

- Date: 9–11 June 2026
- Location: Various places around Northern Ireland and Scotland, particularly Belfast
- Caused by: Response to a stabbing; Anti-immigration sentiment
- Methods: Rioting; protest; vandalism; arson

Parties
Rioters; Ulster loyalists	Northern Ireland Executive; Department of Justice; Police Service of Northern Ireland; Northern Ireland Fire and Rescue Service

Casualties and losses
Several arrested across the United Kingdom	Several PSNI officers injured Two Scottish police officers injured
- At least 3 civilians injured (in Scotland); 27 people made homeless

On 9 June 2026, riots broke out across Belfast following a stabbing attack allegedly committed by an African man the previous evening. Further protests were reported across Northern Ireland and in Glasgow and Edinburgh in Scotland, as well as Southampton in England. Southampton had also seen unrelated rioting during the previous week, following the release of footage of the arrest and murder of Henry Nowak.

Homes, businesses and vehicles were set alight across Northern Ireland during the riots. A number of people were made homeless after their properties were attacked and set fire to by rioters going door-to-door, attempting to identify houses occupied by immigrants. The Times referred to the violence as "spontaneous pogroms" and The Irish Times called it "a race-based pogrom". Rioters also targeted shops and the police, and set fire to vehicles.

On Saturday 13 June, large crowds of counter-protesters gathered in Belfast and Derry to rally against the riots, displaying banners such as "Riots don't speak for Belfast" and "Belfast stands against racism".

== Belfast knife attack ==
Stephen Ogilvie, a 44-year-old disabled man, was attacked by another man with a kitchen knife on Kinnaird Avenue in north Belfast on 8 June 2026 at about 10:30 pm. Some newspapers described it as an attempted beheading. A number of people confronted the suspect until police arrived; one man, Maitiu Mág Tighearnán, fought the suspect with a hurley. Another man who intervened was a friend of Mág Tighearnán, a Portuguese man named as Andre, who was a passenger in Mág Tighearnán's car and was the first person to reach Ogilvie after the attack started. Ogilvie survived and was taken to hospital in serious condition with major injuries to his face and back, resulting in him losing his left eye and sustaining damage to his right eye. On 11 June, it was reported that Ogilvie was in an induced coma but that his condition was improving and that he might be brought out of the coma within 48 hours. On 17 June, Ogilvie's parents issued an update, reporting that he was out of a coma but might still lose the sight in his remaining, right eye.

Police said the attack was not being treated as terrorism, but the investigation was at an early stage. The police initially incorrectly stated that the suspect was Somali. He was subsequently identified as Hadi Alodid, a 30-year-old man reported to be Sudanese, with leave to remain in the UK until 2028. He had reportedly entered the UK in 2023 via the Common Travel Area and was granted refugee status the same year, under a fast-track application scheme due to Sudan's security and humanitarian situation. He was charged with attempted murder, possession of a knife in a public place, and making threats to kill an NHS radiographer on the same day, when he was brought to hospital for injuries to his hand.

It is believed that Ogilvie knew the suspected attacker as they both lived in the same residential building, where Ogilvie had helped Alodid adjust to his new accommodation.

On 10 June, Alodid appeared in court in Belfast via video link from Musgrave Serious Crime Suite. The court was told that the victim had lost his left eye and sustained damage to his right eye as a result of the attack. Alodid was remanded in custody.

In July 2026, assistant chief constable Davy Beck told a joint meeting of the Home Affairs Select Committee and the Northern Ireland Affairs Select Committee that the Police Service of Northern Ireland (PSNI) were investigating the possibility that Alodid may in fact be from Chad rather than Sudan.

=== Responses ===
Prime Minister Sir Keir Starmer called the attack "abhorrent" and praised the first responders and the intervening members of the public. The Stormont leaders of Sinn Féin, the Democratic Unionist Party (DUP), the Ulster Unionist Party, the Alliance Party and the Social Democratic and Labour Party (SDLP) issued a joint statement condemning the attack. The Independent Reviewer of Terrorism Legislation Jonathan Hall KC called for a discussion on migration's impact on the UK's national security.

Jim Allister, the Traditional Unionist Voice MP, spoke in the House of Commons about the danger of "alien cultures" being imported into the UK. Suzanne Breen, the political editor of the Belfast Telegraph, subsequently wrote that the "attack in north Belfast was a barbaric act, but claims that this brand of brutality is entirely 'alien' to Northern Ireland represent a severe case of historical amnesia", citing a number of examples, including that of loyalist paramilitary John White, who in 1973 stabbed and hacked to death politician Paddy Wilson and his friend Irene Andrews.

X (formerly Twitter) owner Elon Musk and other right-wing figures called for protests against migration. Musk shared a post by Tommy Robinson on X that announced the locations of protests, as well as one by Restore Britain that stated "Do not make peace with evil. Destroy it". According to researchers from the Center for Countering Digital Hate, Musk played an "instrumental" role in the riots. Rupert Lowe, the leader of Restore Britain, posted on social media that should his party form a government, it "will aim to prosecute officials and politicians who knowingly placed dangerous third world savages in our communities". The far-right party also pledged that "A Restore Britain government will put murderous third-world savages to death".

A fundraiser set up to support Ogilvie had raised over £30,000 by 17 June. Over £34,000 had also been raised in a fundraiser for Mág Tighearnán, who announced he would be donating £10,000 of it to Ogilvie and splitting the remainder with his Portuguese friend, Andre, with whom he intervened in the attack.

==== Debate about Common Travel Area ====
Some unionist and British politicians, and British newspapers, argued that the fact that the attacker had initially entered Northern Ireland from Dublin before being granted refugee status showed that the Common Travel Area needed to be reviewed, with the Daily Telegraph portraying it as a "backdoor route" into the UK. The Labour Party chair, Anna Turley, stated that there was a "live conversation" happening amongst government ministers to ensure the Common Travel Area is "not used as a back route for people to come here and exploit our asylum system".

The DUP leader and MP, Gavin Robinson, criticised what he called the "open porous border" on the island during a House of Commons debate. Robinson's fellow DUP MP Gregory Campbell criticised the British and Irish governments for what he stated was "virtually controlled immigration" across the Irish border. SDLP leader and Belfast South MP, Claire Hanna, called DUP comments on the border "bunkum, distraction, deflection" and "very ill-intended", arguing that "putting a border on the island ... is neither desirable or practical. It wouldn't have solved the problem of either the grotesque violence that happened in north Belfast at the start of the week, or the lawlessness that has continued throughout. Neither of those would be solved by a border". It was subsequently reported that Irish government data showed that people were crossing the border in both directions before claiming asylum, but that it was more common for people to travel from Northern Ireland into the Republic of Ireland to claim asylum there than for them to cross into the UK to do so.

== Riots ==
Soon after the attack, the far right activist Tommy Robinson posted details of planned demonstrations across the UK on X. A message circulated on WhatsApp listed 26 locations, accompanied by the text "Forward to all men of the age 18 and over. Wear dark clothing... and be prepared to fight or be arrested". The evening after the attack on Ogilvie, masked men claiming to be "getting the foreigners out" were seen kicking in doors and windows on the Lower Newtownards Road. At least three houses, a Middle Eastern supermarket, a Glider bus and numerous vehicles were set ablaze across Belfast. Disorder was primarily reported on the Crumlin and Lower Newtownards Roads. A police car was set on fire in Portadown. Traffic was disrupted by rioters in Derry. In Newtownabbey, multiple cars were set alight, and a Turkish barber shop was attacked in Ballyclare. Many local businesses in Belfast closed early due to the protests, as did Translink services. The fire brigade attended 62 incidents across Belfast.

Twenty-seven people were made homeless after their homes were attacked by rioters going door-to-door trying to find immigrants. BBC News reported that a two-month-old baby had to be rescued during the attacks, according to the PSNI's chief constable, who provided no further details. The victims included Ugandan carers, a Ukrainian family and a Romani family, whose houses were set alight. Neighbours of the Romani family told The Times that it was the third time they had been "put out" of their house. Participants in the violence reportedly chanted slogans including "foreigners out" and "kill all Muslims".

On 9 June, Hilary Benn, Northern Ireland Secretary of State, reported that two police officers had been injured during the riots. Three civilians and two police officers were injured in Scotland after the unrest spread there. On 10 June, a further 12 police officers were injured.

Some participants in the disorder were reported to have set up road checkpoints, with a press photographer stating that "some people got through the checkpoints and others didn't, depending on your skin colour". The Royal College of Nursing reported that some healthcare workers had been "stopped by masked men" when trying to get to work on the evening of 9 June, with the organisation's director, Rita Devlin, stating: "They have been asked to show their credentials to masked men. They have been unable to get into work". At the Ulster Hospital, a nurse was chased into the building after being intimidated by four masked men in an incident that was described as a racist attack. The Police Ombudsman for Northern Ireland has received a complaint that police officers were advising healthcare workers to show identification documents to masked men who were operating a checkpoint close to the Mater Hospital.

On 10 June, a list of addresses in Belfast where it was claimed that immigrants were living was circulated on social media, which the PSNI described as "totally unacceptable". The PSNI stated that anyone who shared the list "may be committing a criminal offence". During the evening, rioters set fire to a Department for Infrastructure street cleaner at Sandyknowes roundabout in Newtownabbey, where the PSNI deployed water cannons to control the crowds. According to the Press Association, "Footage showed dozens of men dressed all in black and wearing face coverings gathering on Antrim Road, where they could be seen tearing bricks from properties and smashing paving stones with sledgehammers to create projectiles to throw at police". Despite these incidents, the level of unrest was lower than on the previous night, with BBC News describing the disorder that did break out elsewhere as "subdued compared to Tuesday night".

At Sandyknowes roundabout, a BBC film crew were followed by a group of masked men and had a stone thrown through the back window of their car. The crew had been filming as a large group clashed with the police. The previous night, photographers and journalists had been threatened by rioters, with some physically assaulted and others told to leave certain areas. Some photo agencies chose not to include photographers' bylines for safety reasons.

On 11 June, a smaller protest took place in East Belfast, with Translink suspending services. Around 100 people were reported to have blocked the Newtownards Road and around 170 people were present at a protest in Whiteabbey in Newtownabbey.

During the riots, the PSNI had been supported by 200 police officers from forces in Great Britain. The force used plastic bullets during its response.

According to Wired, an Active Club (a global neo-Nazi online network) known as the "Ulster Youth Club" quickly activated in response to the protests, playing a role "in not only stoking tensions, but advising and orchestrating the masked youths who spearheaded much of the violence". A co-founder of the Global Project Against Hate and Extremism reported that "protests in Belfast had hardly started before Active Club senior voices were functioning as a support network for the racist riots and encouraging replication in other countries". Another Swedish Active Club known as Gym XIV urged its Irish followers to participate in the riots.

=== Responses ===
In a statement issued on 10 June, Ogilvie's family expressed shock at the attack, while also saying that it should not be used to incite violence and that "overnight unrest is not welcome". The family's statement, issued via MLA Phillip Brett, said: "We have many migrants who make a deeply valuable contribution to our country, including in our healthcare system and hospitality sector, and we depend on them to make our country work. We do not want this terrible tragedy to be used to divide people or fuel hostility".

Maitiu Mág Tighearnán, the man who fought the attacker with a hurley, condemned the riots.

Hilary Benn, the secretary of state for Northern Ireland, referred on 11 June to "the truly shocking scenes we saw on Tuesday night, with people being burnt out of their homes because of the colour of their skin. There is no justification for that, and nothing can explain it away, and it's left a lot of people terrified". Northern Ireland's first minister, Michelle O'Neill, referred to the burning of homes as "disgusting cowardice", and added that "Racism, intimidation and violence are wrong wherever they occur". The justice minister, Naomi Long, stated that "There is no place for masked thugs to take to the streets and threaten, intimidate, disrupt and cause wanton damage – it is simply disingenuous to claim this is being carried out for the good of Northern Ireland". SDLP South Belfast MP Claire Hanna told BBC Newsnight that "negative actors online and politicians locally who don't really care what communities in north Belfast have been through" had encouraged the violence and that "What you're seeing is a race-based pogrom. We are seeing men going door to door asking to get the foreigners out based exclusively on the colour of their skin".

Jon Boutcher, the chief constable of the PSNI, said: "The challenge we face with today's online toxic nature is that people are incited by people who are faceless and know nothing about this brilliant, vibrant place". First Minister of Northern Ireland Michelle O'Neill said that for all " ... of those people out there who are stoking up tensions in that social media space who are happy to raise tensions, they do not represent us".

On 10 June, the UK communications regulator Ofcom wrote to online service providers, setting out its concerns that some of the unrest "appears to have been incited online". Ofcom noted that it was monitoring the situation "closely", that it had reminded providers of their duties under the Online Safety Act and that it had "already launched investigations into several platforms". Chi Onwurah, who chairs the Science, Innovation and Technology Select Committee, wrote to the Secretary of State for Science, Innovation and Technology, Liz Kendall, stating "Unrest in Belfast shows that the government hasn't done enough to tackle the scale and speed of the algorithmic amplification of misinformation online".

The Accountability Project Northern Ireland, a group of volunteers formed in summer 2025 to monitor online anti-immigration activity, stated that it had warned the PSNI repeatedly since October 2025 that anti-immigration activists were circulating the addresses of houses that were eventually targeted during the riots.

=== Allegations of Ulster loyalist involvement ===
While the attack on Ogilvie took place in a predominantly nationalist area, the riots that followed occurred in what were described as "staunchly unionist" areas. According to Andrew McQuillan, writing in The Spectator, "there has been anecdotal reporting that in one part of North Belfast, nationalist residents watched on from afar as loyalist youths started rioting". A press photographer said that people from nationalist and unionist backgrounds were working together to run checkpoints at interface areas, although academic Brendan Ciarán Browne wrote that "Road blocks were put in place across the city, reportedly patrolled by 'loyalist' vigilantes".

The PSNI's chief constable, Jon Boutcher, was reported as stating at the time of the riots that it was "too early" to say whether the riots were being orchestrated by criminal gangs or paramilitary groups. According to the Belfast Telegraph, "Some well-known paramilitary figures were seen on the streets during the unrest, but sources say they mainly stayed back and watched as dozens of largely young men, masked and with hoods up, went door to door smashing windows and burning homes". A loyalist source told the newspaper that while they were not "orchestrating or encouraging" the violence, they were deliberately "standing back and refusing to get involved to stop it".

On 11 June, PSNI assistant chief constable Ryan Henderson stated that "At this stage we have no evidence to say that the violence is being coordinated by loyalist paramilitaries. What we have seen is significant coordination from online social media activity, some from people within Northern Ireland – and some from outside of Northern Ireland, outside the island of Ireland – generating that activity".

PSNI assistant chief constable Davy Beck told a joint meeting of the Home Affairs Select Committee and the Northern Ireland Affairs Select Committee in July 2026 that members of loyalist paramilitary groups had been present during the riots and in some cases had directed the violence.

According to the Northern Ireland Commissioner for Children and Young People, some children and young people participated in the disorder due to promises from paramilitary groups that if they rioted, their debts to paramilitary groups would be cleared. The Commissioner, Chris Quinn, stated: "Those debts could be drug debts, they could be loans. These things have been happening for a long time, children and young people getting coerced and groomed by criminal gangs and sometimes taking the rap".

In an editorial, the Irish Times reported that "Not for the first time, an attempt – largely unsuccessful – was made to recruit both sides of Northern Ireland's communal divide into a common anti-immigrant cause. AI-generated propaganda showed the tricolour and union flag side by side. Appeals went out to assemble in nationalist as well as loyalist areas". Historian Kieran Connell also noted these calls, referring to them as "largely unsuccessful attempts by agitators to make the riots a cross-community affair".

Rory Carroll, Ireland correspondent at The Guardian, wrote that "History, demographics and psychology can explain some of the diverging community reactions, but there is also a familiar factor at play under the surface – paramilitaries". Noting Henderson's statement about the lack of evidence of paramilitary co-ordination, Carroll stated that "Instead, there is evidence that some paramilitary leaders chose neutrality, neither stoking nor impeding the violence, to make a point: beware a vacuum". Historian of loyalism, Aaron Edwards, suggested that "one theory is that, given several loyalist paramilitary leaderships have been in negotiations regarding paramilitary disbandment, it's unlikely loyalist groups sanctioned the horrific scenes we witnessed on the streets". He stated that "Another theory – a rather cynical one – is that paramilitary structures have not gone away because they have no intent to do so. By stepping back, some of these groups are essentially saying to the authorities 'we can be useful' in managing racial conflict".

During the annual Twelfth of July celebrations that followed the riots, anti-immigrant symbols were placed on top of a number of bonfires.

=== Historical comparisons ===
A number of commentators made comparisons with historical instances of Catholics being burnt out of their houses by loyalists. Journalist Lara Whyte wrote that "Families being forced out of their homes by masked men in the middle of the night is not new in Belfast. These types of attacks have been part of the playbook of loyalist paramilitaries, like the Ulster Volunteer Force and the Ulster Defence Association, for decades. There is an ugly history of Catholics' homes being burned during the darkest days of the Troubles". Drawing parallels with previous bouts of loyalist violence including the Belfast Pogrom of 1920 and the 1969 Northern Ireland riots, the writer Michael Magee argued that "The parallels are difficult to ignore. The methods employed by these fascistic actors are strikingly familiar. Instead of Catholics, ethnic minorities are now the target".

Speaking in the Dáil Éireann on 10 June, Sinn Féin leader Mary Lou McDonald compared the riots to the Bombay Street violence of 1969 and described them as "orchestrated by loyalist and far-right thugs".

=== Arrests ===
By 13 June, 23 people had been arrested in relation to the disorder, with 17 of those charged in court. By 17 June, a total of 25 people had been arrested, with 10 of those being 16 years old or under and the youngest being 12 years old.

== Counter-protests ==
On 13 June, thousands of protesters gathered in Belfast and Derry to rally against the riots, displaying banners such as "Riots don't speak for Belfast" and "Belfast stands against racism". Around 5,000 people attended the Belfast demonstration, which the organisers called the "largest anti-racism gathering in Belfast". The protestors were addressed by anti-racist activists, trades union officials and politicians including the Lord Mayor Róis-Máire Donnelly of Sinn Fein, the Alliance Party's Kate Nicholl, Matthew O'Toole of the SDLP, People Before Profit's Gerry Carroll and Mal O'Hara of the Green Party of Northern Ireland.

Ahead of the event, AI-generated posters were circulated online, advertising an anti-immigration counter-protest to the anti-racism counter-protest. This was attended by a small group of loyalists.

== See also ==
- List of riots in Northern Ireland
- Modern immigration to the United Kingdom
- Far-right politics in the United Kingdom
- 2021 Northern Ireland riots
- 2023 Dublin riot
- 2024 United Kingdom riots
- 2025 Northern Ireland riots
