= Róis-Máire Donnelly =

Lord Mayor of Belfast

The Right Honourable Cllr Róis-Máire Donnelly
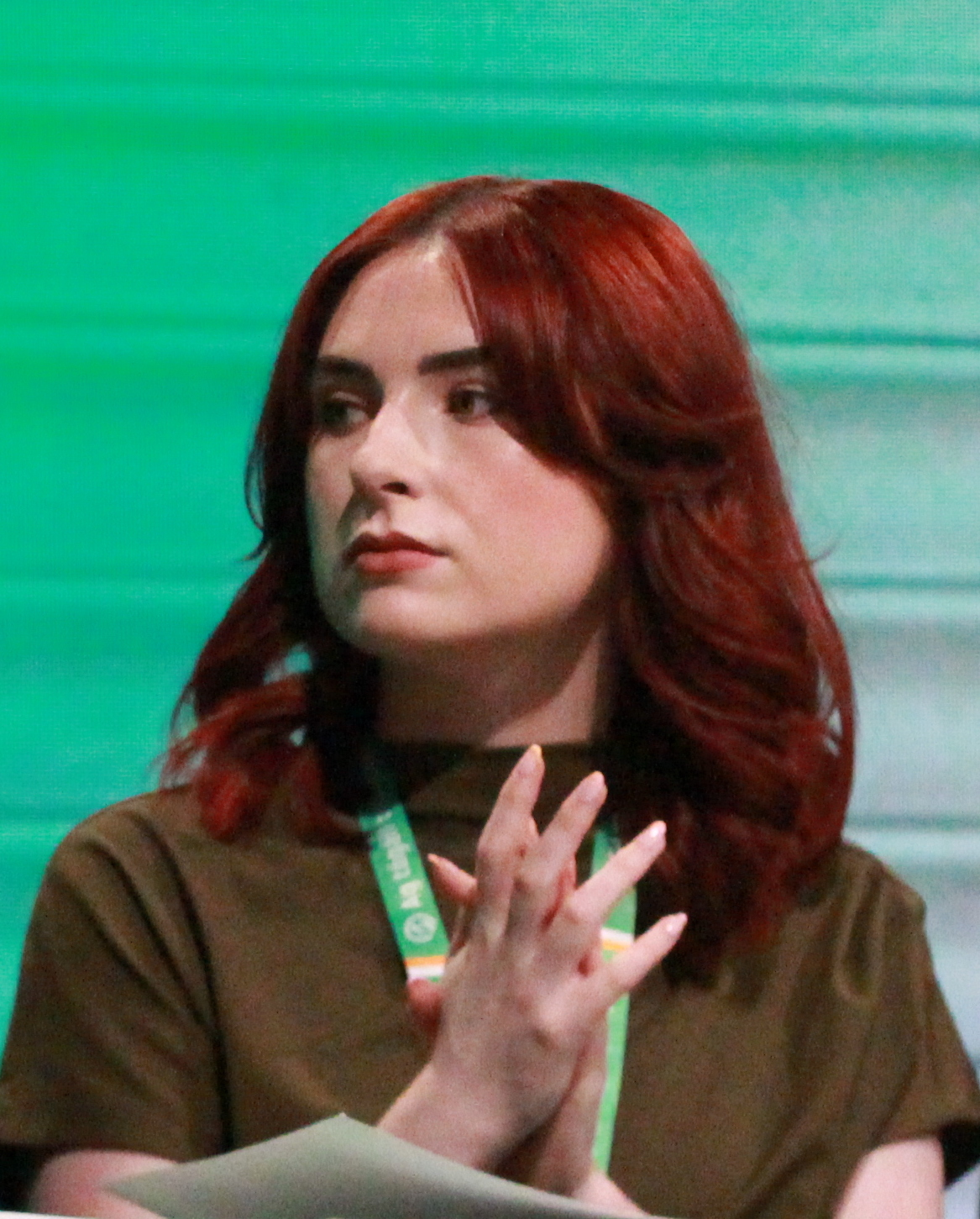
- Donnelly in 2026

85th Lord Mayor of Belfast
- Incumbent
- Assumed office 1 June 2026
- Preceded by: Tracy Kelly

Member of Belfast City Council
- Incumbent
- Assumed office 29 November 2022
- Preceded by: Stevie Corr
- Constituency: Black Mountain

Personal details
- Born: 1995 or 1996 (age 30–31) Ballymurphy, Northern Ireland
- Party: Sinn Féin
- Education: Queens University Belfast (BSc)

Róis-Máire Donnelly (born 1995 or 1996) is an Irish Sinn Féin politician who is the 85th Lord Mayor of Belfast since 1 June 2026. She has been a councillor of the Belfast City Council for Black Mountain since November 2022. Donnelly is the first person from Ballymurphy and surrounding area and the first fluent Irish-speaking woman to become Lord Mayor of Belfast.

== Early life and education ==
Róis-Máire Donnelly was born in Ballymurphy and is the daughter of Geraldine and Jim Donnelly, who was imprisoned in the H-Blocks at the time of her birth. She spent the first five years of her life living with her mother and maternal grandmother Rosie on Ballymurphy Road. She attended Naíscoil and Bunscoil an tSléibhe Dhuibh and St Dominic's Grammar School for Girls before she earned a Bachelor of Science in psychology from Queen's University Belfast.

== Career ==
Donnelly has volunteered for Integrated Services for Children and Young People in the Upper Springfield, Cumann Spóirt an Phobail, and for the charity Active Communities Network.

Donnelly worked as an operations manager for Active Communities Network, a youth and community development organisation. She has been the chair of the Newstart Education Centre, an alternative education centre in the Lower Falls area of West Belfast since December 2025.

=== Belfast City Council ===
Donnelly has attributed Sinn Féin's community activism for why she decided to join the party. She replaced Stevie Corr to represent the Black Mountain electoral area on the Belfast City Council.

She first ran for election in the 2023 Belfast City Council election and was elected on the eighth count.

She was the chair of the Belfast City Council Climate and City Resilience Committee.

=== Lord Mayor of Belfast ===
Donnelly was informed she would be the next Lord Mayor of Belfast a few weeks before it was first announced on 27 May 2026. She was installed as the Lord Mayor of Belfast on 1 June 2026. She has been described as the first Irish-speaking Lord Mayor of Belfast and the first female Irish-speaking Lord Mayor of Belfast.

She has made statements in support of the Irish language, the LGBT community, and solidarity with Palestinians. She has said "the biggest issue people in Belfast face is the cost of living."

Donnelly described the 2026 Belfast riots as "absolute thuggery" and said "I call on those involved in this violence to stop, and stop now. You do not represent Belfast."
