= 2011 Northern Ireland riots =

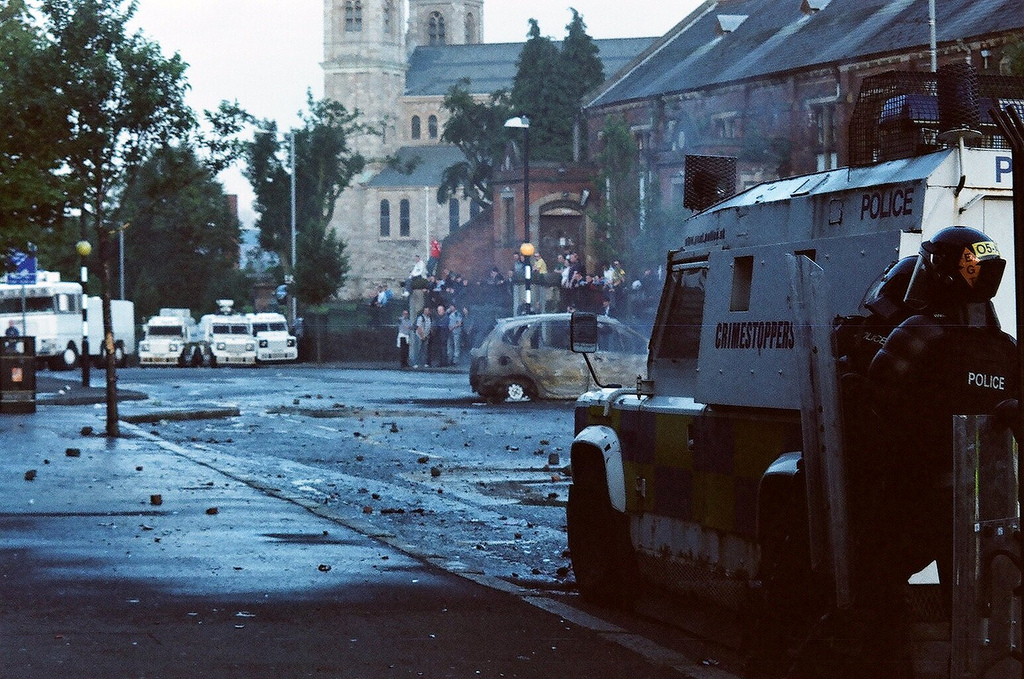
- Riot police and a burnt-out car in Ardoyne
- Date: 20 June 2011 – 16 July 2011
- Location: Belfast, Portadown, Newry, Ballyclare, Larne, Derry, Ballymena
- Methods: Demonstrations, rioting, arson, houses damaged, gun crime
- Result: Protestant and Catholic houses damaged; Families evacuated; PSNI criticised for the way they tackled riots

Casualties and losses
300+ injuries	50+ arrests

The 2011 Northern Ireland riots were a series of riots between 20 June 2011 and 16 July 2011, starting originally in Belfast, before spreading to other parts of Northern Ireland. They were initiated by the Ulster Volunteer Force.

== June riots ==
The sectarian violence began around 21:00 BST on the night of Monday 20 June, when a large number of loyalists made their way from the unionist Mount and Castlereagh Street areas to the nationalist Short Strand enclave. This provoked a response from the nationalists. The Police Service of Northern Ireland (PSNI) Assistant Chief Constable Alistair Finlay said that around 500–600 people were involved in the rioting. According to the PSNI, the riots are said to have been initially instigated by the Ulster Volunteer Force (UVF).

The clashes saw various dangerous objects such as petrol bombs, bricks, bottles, fireworks and smoke bombs thrown by both sides in what police described as "high-level, life-threatening, organised, serious and sustained" attack by people "hell-bent on disorder". At one point six shots were fired from the nationalist Short Strand area followed by about five shots from the loyalist Pitt Park. Two shots hit a police Land Rover in what the PSNI claimed was attempted murder of their officers. One officer suffered eye injuries when a laser pen was being used to blind officers.

The riots in Short Strand were described by politicians as the worst violence in the area in a decade.

On the Tuesday night, during further clashes between unionists and nationalists, about 700 people were involved. A photographer was shot in the leg by a gunman firing from the nationalist area, which police blamed on dissident republicans.

By Wednesday 22 June, discussions were held between community representatives, politicians, and loyalist and nationalist figures. The result was for both sides to police their communities to avoid further violence. Later that night the area was largely peaceful despite unionist and nationalist groups – held back by community marshals – being involved for several hours in a stand-off at the Mountpottinger Road end of the Short Strand until around 01:30 on Thursday morning. Nationalist marshals intervened to stop nationalist youths attacking police Land Rovers.

A 20-year-old woman was arrested on suspicion of possessing an offensive weapon and assaulting police, which was followed on the Wednesday by the arrest of a 22-year-old man from West Belfast about the rioting.

== July riots ==
A riot broke out on 1 July 2011 in Castlereagh Street and Albertbridge Road, where the police used water cannons again to stop rioting continuing into the night.

On 9 July, loyalist rioters attacked the PSNI in Ballyclare after the PSNI removed Union and paramilitary flags from outside a Catholic church.

Expected riots broke out on 11 July and nationalist rioters attacked the PSNI in the Oldpark and Broadway areas of Belfast. The Royal Victoria Hospital's new £9 million extensions was damaged. It is believed shots were fired.

More expected rioting broke out the following day in nationalist areas of north and south Belfast following the annual Orange Order Twelfth of July parades. Trouble also broke out in Derry, where police claimed people as young as ten were involved. The PSNI were criticised for their handling of the riots.

On 15 July, police in Portadown came under attack with a riot involving around 100 people. Immigrants were forced to flee Northern Ireland when their home came under attack by loyalists in a Catholic area. The next day, in Corcraine, Portadown, there was further unrest and rioting.

== See also ==
- Belfast City Hall flag protests
- 2012 North Belfast riots
- 2013 Belfast riots
- 2010 Northern Ireland riots
- 2005 Belfast riots
- 2002 Short Strand clashes
