= Belfast North =

Belfast North may refer to:

- Belfast North (Assembly constituency), a constituency in the Northern Ireland Assembly
- Belfast North (Northern Ireland Parliament constituency), a borough constituency of the Parliament of Northern Ireland from 1921 to 1929
- Belfast North (UK Parliament constituency), a constituency in the United Kingdom House of Commons

== See also ==
- Belfast, capital and largest city of Northern Ireland
- Belfast Northstars, a baseball club from Northern Ireland
