= OVIK =

British armoured vehicle manufacturer

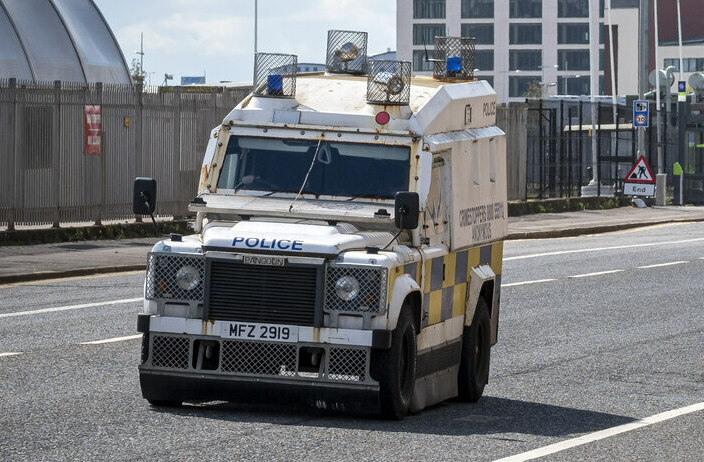
A Police Service of Northern Ireland Land Rover Defender-based OVIK Pangolin on Queen's Road, Belfast

OVIK was a British company that designed and manufactured specialist and armoured vehicles and chassis systems. It was established in 2008, and based in Dorset. OVIK designs and develops specialist vehicles (and other equipment) for defence, security, emergency services and commercial customers.

== History ==
OVIK was formed by brothers Jez and Duncan Hermer in 2008. OVIK was both a specialist vehicle manufacturer and an engineering consultancy offering support for the design, prototype and test of land-based and amphibious special vehicles. OVIK was involved in the transformation of the Singapore Technologies Kinetics Bronco All Terrain Tracked Carrier vehicle into the UK MOD's WARTHOG vehicle, a vehicle developed as an Urgent Operational Requirement (UOR) for Operation Herrick in Afghanistan.

The company went in liquidation in April 2020.

== Etymology ==
OVIK was based in Dorset, and close to the British Army's Armour Centre at Bovington. The name OVIK was derived from the name of the Swedish town Örnsköldsvik often shortened to OVIK, a town Jez Hermer is associated with through his work with Hägglund & Söner, a company headquartered in the town.

== Products ==
- Crossway 4x4 and 6x6 vehicles. Customers included the United Kingdom Thames Valley Police and Dorset Police, UK Civil Nuclear Constabulary, Dorset Police, Thames Valley Police, Kent Police and Essex Police.
- Centaur Chassis - Specialist, all terrain chassis and chassis cowls.
- Pangolin Armoured Public Order Vehicle, now in its third generation. 193 are in service with the Police Service of Northern Ireland and Merseyside Police.
- Meerkat Super Light Tracked Vehicle (SLTV).
- OVIK Cameleon IV440 Modular Mission Vehicle
