= Suzanne Breen =

Northern Irish journalist

Suzanne Breen (born 1967) is an Irish journalist.

== Career ==
Suzanne Breen graduated from Queen's University Belfast with an honours degree in English and Politics in 1989 and went on to take the National Council for the Training of Journalists (NCTJ) course in newspaper journalism at Belfast's College of Business Studies.

She began her career at The Irish News and then in 1992 joined the Belfast office of The Irish Times where she held several posts from general news reporter to Senior Northern Correspondent.

She was the Northern Ireland editor for the Sunday Tribune, before joining the Belfast Telegraph as Political Editor in 2017. She has written for Village Magazine on Northern Irish issues. and has also contributed to several other Irish magazines such as Fortnight and Magill.

== Dispute over right to protect sources ==
She was contacted by the Real IRA when they claimed responsibility for the shootings at Massereene Barracks and admitted killing Denis Donaldson.

In 2009, she was approached by the Police Service of Northern Ireland and asked to hand over details about sources, which she refused to do. She was supported by the National Union of Journalists and the Sunday Tribune. Breen stated that her life could be in danger if she reveals her sources.

Initially, the judge said he was minded to grant the order to the PSNI, but, in June 2009, the High Court in Belfast ruled in her favour, saying she did not have to hand over her notes. She had been told by a third party that if she handed over her notes, she and her family would be in danger from the Real IRA.

== Awards ==
- Northern Ireland Journalist of the Year (1994)
- Northern Ireland Feature Journalist of the Year (1995, 1996, 1997, 2010, 2016).
- Outstanding journalism by women on the island of Ireland (1999).
