= 2010 Northern Ireland riots =

Civil unrest across Northern Ireland

- Date: 11–15 July 2010
- Location: Belfast, Derry, County Armagh
- Methods: Rioting
- Result: 83 PSNI officers injured

The 2010 Northern Ireland riots were riots and civil disturbance in Northern Ireland in July 2010, orchestrated by Irish republicans.

== Rioting ==
The violence began during the Protestant Eleventh Night celebrations when three Police Service of Northern Ireland (PSNI) officers were shot by a masked man with a shotgun on North Queen Street in north Belfast.

In the early hours of the Orange Order parade, rioters pelted police in two nationalist areas, New Lodge in the north and Broadway in west Belfast. The Continuity IRA was blamed for orchestrating both riots. By the night, violence had spread to other areas in Belfast. In Ardoyne, police were attacked by petrol bombs whilst 70 baton rounds were fired back, injuring two people. One policewoman was seriously injured in Crumlin Road by a lump of concrete thrown at her from a roof. In Ormeau Road, a car was set alight and police were attacked. Disturbances also happened around Short Strand and at Botanic railway station. In west Belfast, a bus driver was forced to drive to Woodbourne police station by two masked men claiming a bomb was on the upper deck - this late turned out to be a hoax.

In County Armagh, a train heading for Dublin was stopped near Lurgan when youth attempted to fire gasoline bombs and hijack the train. The passengers were safely escorted and unhurt. Police were attacked by petrol bombs in the town, whilst a car was set alight in Armagh. In Derry, in the Bogside, a police vehicle was set alight and another was shot five times by a masked gunmen, although nobody was injured. 40 to 60 petrol bombs were thrown in some of the "worst" violence in a decade in the city.

On 14 July petrol bombs were thrown at police and a car set alight in north Belfast, although the riot was not as big as the previous nights.

== Aftermath ==
Sinn Féin blamed dissidents from the Continuity IRA for the violence. British Prime Minister David Cameron called the rioters' actions "totally unacceptable" and praised the "brave" police. The PSNI said the riots will cost the force "millions of pounds". The assistant chief constable said children as young as 10 were involved in the violence.

== See also ==
- 2011 Northern Ireland riots
- Belfast City Hall flag protests
- 2010 Newry car bombing
- 2009 Massereene Barracks shooting
- 2005 Belfast riots
