= Famine Song =

Ulster loyalist song

The "Famine Song" is a song sung by some Ulster loyalists in Ulster and Scotland and is normally directed at Catholics and, in Scotland, Irish people, those of Irish descent or those with perceived affiliations to Ireland. It is also sung by fans of Scottish football club Rangers due to rival Celtic's Irish roots. Set to the tune of "The John B. Sails" popularised by Carl Sandburg, the lyrics of the song make reference to the 1840s' Great Famine of Ireland. The song is often heard at loyalist marches in Northern Ireland. "The Famine Song" has received criticism due to the racist and sectarian nature of its lyrics and, in some cases, those singing it have received criminal convictions.

== Background ==
The Great Famine in Ireland during the 1840s led the country's population to fall from approximately 8 to 5 million as a result of starvation and emigration. Although the bulk of emigrants moved to North America, large numbers moved to Scotland and England, settling in London, Liverpool and Glasgow. Since then, sectarianism in Glasgow in particular has received much media attention, with its two main football teams being focal points of identity: Celtic drawing large support from the descendants of Irish Catholics, and Rangers from Protestants in Scotland and Ulster (chiefly Northern Ireland and County Donegal).

The song was first sung publicly by Rangers fans at a match at Celtic Park in April 2008.

== Criticism ==
Lex Gold, the Scottish Premier League (SPL) chief executive at the time, said that football clubs could be deducted points if fans continue to sing such songs:

Clubs know they need to be alert and make sure their fans are doing all they can to avoid sectarian or other offensive abuse. The verse of the song that has featured hugely is racist, it's not sectarian as such, it's racist. The rules were structured to help to try to tackle this. You don't start with points deduction. We have a range of sanctions which can be applied.

John Reid, Celtic's chairman, tried to highlight the non-Catholic specific aspects of the famine: "Few of those who sing this song will have stopped to think that famine is non-sectarian and the millions of people who died or were forced into mass emigration – some to Scotland – were from all faiths and traditions within Ireland.

Rangers have repeatedly asked their fans not to sing the song. A Rangers fans' organisation, the Rangers Supporters' Trust, denied that the song is racist: it instead described the song as a "wind-up" that is designed to mock not the famine itself, but Celtic fans' perceived affiliations with the Republic of Ireland.

The Republic of Ireland's Consul-General approached the Scottish Government regarding the song. A Scottish Government spokesman said: "The Scottish Government is totally committed to combating sectarianism and bigotry, which is why we have expanded on the work of the previous administration and are doing more. We are working with the clubs themselves, as they are part of the solution to the problem.

In the context of their charitable projects in partnership with Rangers, UNICEF expressed their concern regarding the song and called on the club to ensure it was not sung at their matches.

== Legal issues ==
Kenny Scott, Rangers' Head of Security and Operations, said in October 2008 that conversations with the Strathclyde Police made it clear to the club that there was the potential for supporters singing the song to be arrested. In November 2008, a Rangers fan was found guilty of a breach of the peace (aggravated by religious and racial prejudice) for singing the song during a game in Kilmarnock. At his appeal in June 2009, three Scottish judges ruled that the song is racist because it targets people of Irish origin. In the case, William Walls v. the Procurator Fiscal, Kilmarnock, the High Court of Justiciary held on appeal, in an opinion delivered by Lord Carloway, that:

"the song calls upon persons of Irish descent, who are living in Scotland, to go back to the land of their ancestors, namely Ireland [...] they are racist in calling upon people native to Scotland to leave the country because of their racial origins. This is a sentiment which, once more, many persons will find offensive."

Although it was accepted that the song lyrics technically state a fact followed by a question (The famine is over, why dont you go home?), it was deemed that this would reasonably be understood as not only a question but as a suggestion under threat. The appellant, who was convicted for breach of the peace racially aggravated and aggravated by religious prejudice having sung the Famine Song and made a number of other remarks during a football match, had his appeal denied and his conviction upheld.

== See also ==
- Irish diaspora
- Irish Scottish people
- Old Firm
- Sectarianism in Glasgow
