= 2013 Belfast riots =

2013 riots in July and August

- Date: 12–17 July 2013; 9 August 2013
- Location: Belfast, Northern Ireland
- Methods: Demonstrations, rioting
- Result: At least 88 police officers injured; At least two civilians injured; Extra police officers deployed in Northern Ireland; Around 200 arrests

The 2013 Belfast riots was a series of riots taking place in Belfast in Northern Ireland. They came months after the Belfast City Hall flag protests ignited rioting.

== July riots ==
Rioting broke out following the 12 July Orange Order parade, when local Orangemen were barred from returning via their traditional route via the main Crumlin Road passing the Catholic-populated Ardoyne in north Belfast, which ignited protests from loyalists. Trouble also spread to south and east Belfast.

The Police Service of Northern Ireland (PSNI) fired about 20 plastic baton rounds at rioters and used two mobile water cannons. For several hours they dealt with loyalists and nationalists exchanging missiles across the police line, and at one point a group of loyalists used ceremonial swords to attack the police lines. Nigel Dodds, the unionist MP for Belfast North, was injured and hospitalised when struck in the head by a missile when he was trying to negotiate with police officers in Woodvale Avenue. 32 officers were hurt.

The PSNI Chief Constable called 400 extra police officers from England, Scotland and Wales to deal with the situation - more than 600 from the British mainland were already supporting the PSNI beforehand. It was an unprecedented move - in the past, and during the Troubles, the Royal Ulster Constabulary (RUC) never called in extra police but used the British Army soldiers, who withdrew from Northern Ireland in 2007. By the end of August, 106 arrests were made and 77 were charged.

== August riots ==
Violent clashes broke out on the evening of Friday 9 August when loyalists attempted to prevent a parade of 5,000 Irish republican marking the anniversary of internment in 1971 through the city centre. The parade was a joint alliance of dissident groups which included the 32 County Sovereignty Movement, the political wing of the New IRA. It was legally given permission but up to 1,000 loyalists blocked their route at around 6 pm and attacked riot police around Royal Avenue/North Street, and clashes between loyalists and nationalists took place.

By an hour later, PSNI officers and armoured vehicles blocked the republican parade in North Queen Street in New Lodge. This would become a second stand-off from the one around Royal Avenue involving loyalists. The parade organisers decided to avoid Royal Avenue and take a route via Carrick Hill and Millfield, near the city centre, towards west Belfast. "Serious disorder" took place on these roads as riot police separated the two groups. The protesters were then pushed back towards the Shankill Road area.

The PSNI fired 26 plastic baton rounds and deployed two water cannons. Michael Copeland, an Ulster Unionist Party (UUP) politician, claimed that he and his family members were assaulted by police in Royal Avenue. In total, 56 police officers and two civilians were injured.

Northern Ireland Secretary Theresa Villiers described the violence as "shameful". Within four days the PSNI arrested 90 people of which 66 were charged, and released photos of other wanted offenders.

== See also ==
- Belfast City Hall flag protests
- 2012 North Belfast riots
- 2011 Northern Ireland riots
