= 2005 Belfast riots =

Riot in the UK

- Date: 10–12 September 2005 (previous riots also happened in July)
- Location: Belfast and County Antrim, Northern Ireland
- Caused by: Orange Order re-routing
- Methods: Street protests, riots

Parties
Police Service of Northern Ireland; British Army	Ulster loyalists (including members of the Ulster Volunteer Force)	Ulster loyalists (including members of Loyalist Volunteer Force)

Casualties and losses
81 police officers injured		

The 2005 Belfast riots were serious loyalist riots and civil disturbances in Belfast, Northern Ireland in September 2005. The violence broke out after the Protestant Orange Order Whiterock parade was re-routed to avoid the Irish nationalist Springfield Road area. Clashes also broke out in several towns in County Antrim. The incidents took place amid a fierce feud between members of the Ulster Volunteer Force (UVF) and Loyalist Volunteer Force (LVF), who are also thought to have orchestrated the riots.

== Background ==
Amid increasing sectarian violence and feuds between loyalists, the Whiterock Orange Order parade was delayed in June by the Order in protest against the decision to re-route it via a disused factory site. Irish nationalists opposed the Order to run through their streets. On 8 September, the Parades Commission said that the decision will stand. Loyalists blocked roads in north and west Belfast as a result.

On 13 July 2005, 80 police officers and seven civilians were injured during nationalist rioting in Ardoyne, north Belfast. Members of the Continuity IRA were blamed after police officers were attacked after withdrawing from policing an Orange Order parade with petrol and blast bombs.

On 4 August 2005, a five-hour loyalist riot in north Belfast injured 40 police officers. The rioting broke out after the arrests of six men in connection with the loyalist feud between the UVF and LVF paramilitaries.

== Clashes ==
On the first night of violence on Saturday 10 September, a policeman was shot in the eye as a barrage of petrol bombs were thrown at Police Service of Northern Ireland (PSNI) officers. An Ulster Defence Association (UDA) member was also hurt in a bomb blast. A cameraman from the BBC was also abducted by loyalist gunmen in Lower Shankill estate, where his camera was destroyed before being released.

Rioting continued for a second day on 11 September as a 700-strong mob clashed with police, blocking roads and setting cars on fire. The violence spread to Albertbridge Road in east Belfast. 1,000 police officers and 1,000 British Army soldiers were deployed.

On the third night of rioting, violence spread to County Antrim where police were attacked and cars set ablaze in Lisburn, Ballymena, Carrickfergus and other towns. The situation in Belfast was reduced.

== Aftermath ==
The riots were the worst in Northern Ireland since the end of the Troubles. PSNI statistics show that 115 shots were fired at police, 146 blast bombs thrown, and 116 vehicles were hijacked. The Orange Order blamed the PSNI's actions for being "brutal". A police investigation discovered a loyalist bomb factory in Highfield estate, north Belfast.

On 14 September 2005, the Northern Ireland Secretary Peter Hain announced that the British government no longer recognised the UVF's ceasefire implemented in 1994 following the "ruthless" attacks on police during the riots.

Two loyalist men, John Main and Colin Harbinson, from Belfast's Glencairn area, were jailed in 2007 for opening fire and attempting to murder security forces during the riots.

== See also ==
- Holy Cross dispute
- 2011 Northern Ireland riots
- Belfast City Hall flag protests
- 1997 Northern Ireland riots
