= Christopher McWilliams =

Irish National Liberation Army volunteer

- Christopher "Crip" McWilliams in 2000
- Born: 15 December 1963; Belfast, Northern Ireland
- Died: 28 June 2008 (aged 44); Daisy Hill Hospital, Newry, County Down, Northern Ireland
- Resting place: Monkshill Cemetery, Newry
- Other name: Crip
- Known for: Assassination of loyalist leader Billy Wright
- Military career
- Paramilitaries: Irish National Liberation Army; Irish People's Liberation Organisation
- Conflict: The Troubles

Christopher McWilliams (15 December 1963 – 28 June 2008) was an Irish Republican paramilitary who was a member of both the Irish People's Liberation Organisation (IPLO) and the Irish National Liberation Army (INLA) during the Troubles in Northern Ireland. He was convicted of the murder of Loyalist Volunteer Force (LVF) leader Billy Wright, who was shot by an INLA unit led by McWilliams inside the Maze Prison.

== Background ==
McWilliams was born on 15 December 1963 and grew up in staunchly republican west Belfast. His 16-year-old brother Paul, a member of the Provisional Irish Republican Army youth section (Na Fianna), was shot dead by British Army soldiers in 1977 as he threw petrol bombs at their observation post during rioting in Ballymurphy. The following week McWilliams placed a death notice in the Irish News regarding his brother's death: "He was shot in the back by a coward and died a hero".

== Paramilitary activities ==
In 1984, McWilliams was jailed for fourteen years for his part in a shoot-out in a flat in the Lenadoon area of west Belfast in which a leading INLA figure, Paul McCann, and a Royal Ulster Constabulary policeman died, but did not serve the full sentence. Seven years later, while still a member of the IPLO, McWilliams was sentenced to life imprisonment for the murder of Colm Mahon, a bar manager, on 15 December 1991, when Mahon asked McWilliams and his friends to leave the Frames Snooker Hall on Little Donegall Street, Belfast, on McWilliams' birthday. McWilliams later claimed that he did not carry out the killing and stated that he would name an alleged IPLO gunman who actually shot Mahon.

== Shooting of Billy Wright ==
It was while McWilliams was at Maghaberry prison that he had joined the INLA. In June 1997, McWilliams was among INLA prisoners then transferred to H-Block 6 in the Maze prison following the attempted killing of Kevin McAlorum, an associate of Hugh Torney.

On 27 December 1997, McWilliams shot and killed LVF leader Billy Wright, known as "King Rat". Early in 1997 INLA inmates within the Maze prison had informed prison officers that "they intend, given a chance, to take out the LVF". The Prison Officers' Association said precautions had been put in place to ensure inmates from the two organisations did not come into contact with each other as the factions were not participating in ceasefires at the time, and were violently opposed to one another. Their prisoners, however, were housed in the same prison block – H-Block 6 and, despite any precautions that may have been taken, on 27 December 1997 an INLA team, armed with smuggled pistols and led by McWilliams and including John Kennaway and John "Sonny" Glennon, scaled the roof of A wing and dropped to the forecourt outside H Block 6.

The three men immediately ambushed Wright in a prison van as it was taking him for a visit with his girlfriend and son. While Kennaway restrained the van's driver, and with Glennon covering him, he slid open the rear door where Wright sat with another loyalist prisoner, Norman Green, and a prison officer. With an alleged smile on his face, McWilliams shouted the words: "Armed INLA volunteers" and pointed his pistol (a Hungarian PA-63 semi-automatic) at Wright, who instantly stood up and kicked out at McWilliams. As Green and the officer threw themselves onto the floor for safety, McWilliams opened fire on Wright. Despite being shot, Wright continued to kick and lash out; McWilliams then climbed into the van and kept on firing at Wright, hitting him a total of seven times. Wright died of the final shot which lacerated his aorta. The three men then returned to their wing and surrendered to prison officers. On 20 October 1998 they were convicted of murder and possession of a firearm and ammunition with intent to endanger life. They were sentenced to life imprisonment for the murder and twenty years for the firearms offence, but served only two years in jail due to the early release provisions of the Good Friday Agreement.

== The Cory Collusion Inquiry ==
The nature of Wright's killing, within a high security prison, has led to speculation that the authorities colluded with the INLA to have him killed as he was a danger to the emerging Northern Ireland peace process. Wright's father campaigned for a public inquiry into his son's murder and appealed for help to the Northern Ireland, British and Irish authorities for help in the matter. The murder was investigated by the Cory Collusion Inquiry and it was recommended that the UK Government launch an inquiry into the circumstances of Wright's death.

In June 2005 an inquiry into Wright's murder began, chaired by Lord MacLean. Also sitting on the inquiry were academician Andrew Coyle of the University of London and the former Bishop of Hereford, the Right Reverend John Oliver.

McWilliams was interviewed by reporter Martin O'Hagan after the murder of Billy Wright, incensing dissident loyalists. O'Hagan subsequently published another article accusing McWilliams of having stalked a schoolgirl.

== After his release ==
McWilliams had served only two years for the murder of Wright and was released from Magilligan prison on 20 October 2000 under the terms of the Good Friday Agreement. Upon his release McWilliams offered to return to the Maze to stage a reconstruction of the murder but refused to go into the details of the attack. He also denied knowing that security cameras were not working and that a watch tower was unmanned that day. He also stated that the "decision was taken to eliminate Billy Wright solely because he was the man who had opted to direct a ruthless campaign of slaughter of innocent Catholics from inside Long Kesh". In 2006, South Armagh victims campaigner, Willie Frazer, called for McWilliams to be returned to prison following accusations that McWilliams had become re-involved with dissident republicans in South Down.

== Death ==
The grave of McWilliams in Monkshill Cemetery, Newry, County Down, adorned with floral tributes in the shape of the Starry Plough Irish republican flag.

McWilliams died on 28 June 2008 in Daisy Hill Hospital, Newry from leukemia, aged 44.
