= Robert Hamill =

Robert Hamill may refer to:

- Killing of Robert Hamill (died 1997) Irish Catholic civilian
- Robert Hamill Inquiry
- Red Hamill (1917–1985) Professional ice hockey player
- Rob Hamill (born 1964) New Zealand rower and political candidate
