= Cory Collusion Inquiry =

The Cory Collusion Inquiry was established to conduct an independent inquiry into deaths relating to the 'Troubles' in Northern Ireland.

A retired Supreme Court of Canada judge, Peter Cory was appointed to undertake a thorough investigation of allegations of collusion between British and Irish security forces and paramilitaries in six particular cases in Northern Ireland. Two of the cases - the killing of two Royal Ulster Constabulary officers and the killing of Northern Ireland Lord Justice Maurice Gibson and Lady Cecily Gibson - relate to allegations of collusion by the Garda Síochána and these reports were submitted to the Irish government.

== The Inquiry ==
In the case of the two RUC officers, who were killed in an ambush by the Provisional IRA on 20 March 1989, Cory considered all the relevant material, including intelligence reports, and concluded that evidence was revealed that, if accepted, could be found to constitute collusion. As a result, he recommended a public inquiry into the matter. The Smithwick Tribunal issued its report on 3 December 2013, finding there had been collusion between members of the Gardaí and the IRA, which resulted in the deaths of the two officers.

In the case of Lord Justice and Lady Gibson, who were killed in a car-bomb explosion by the Provisional IRA on 25 April 1987, Mr Justice Cory concluded that there is no evidence of collusion by the Garda Síochána or any other Government agency that would warrant the holding of an inquiry.

The other four cases - the murders of Pat Finucane, Robert Hamill, Rosemary Nelson and Billy Wright - relate to allegations of collusion by British security forces and these were submitted to the British Government.

== The result ==
Cory recommended in all four cases that the UK Government hold public inquiries:

- An inquiry into Rosemary Nelson case opened at the Craigavon Civic Centre in April 2005. The panel members are Sir Michael Morland (Chair), Dame Valerie Strachan and Sir Anthony Burden.
- June 2005 saw the Billy Wright inquiry open, chaired by Lord MacLean. Also sitting on the inquiry are academic professor Andrew Coyle from the University of London and the former Bishop of Hereford, the Reverend John Oliver.
- The preliminary hearing of the Robert Hamill Inquiry was held on 24 May 2005 in Portadown. The inquiry is chaired by Sir Edwin Jowitt, the other panel members are Sir John Evans and Reverend Baroness (Kathleen) Richardson of Calow and started its full hearings in January 2009.
- The UK Government announced an inquiry would be held into the Pat Finucane case. The report of the Patrick Finucane Review, headed by Sir Desmond de Silva, was published in January 2012.

On 7 June 2005 the British government passed the Inquiries Act 2005, limiting the scope of the inquiries proposed by Cory, which Cory has criticised, stating that it "...would make a meaningful inquiry impossible"
