= Lindsay Robb =

Northern Irish loyalist (1967–2005)

- Robb during his gun-running trial, 1995
- Born: 1967; Lurgan, County Armagh, Northern Ireland
- Died: 31 December 2005 (age 38); Glasgow, Scotland
- Cause of death: Multiple stab wounds
- Occupation: Gardener
- Known for: Political spokesman and negotiator, paramilitary
- Political party: Progressive Unionist Party
- Movement: Ulster Volunteer Force; Loyalist Volunteer Force
- Criminal charge: Gun-running
- Criminal penalty: Ten years imprisonment
- Criminal status: Released under the terms of the Belfast Agreement

Lindsay Robb (1967–31 December 2005) was a Northern Irish loyalist who was a member of the Ulster Volunteer Force (UVF) before defecting to the Loyalist Volunteer Force (LVF). A native of Lurgan, County Armagh, Robb was a leading member of the Progressive Unionist Party (PUP) until 1995 when he was convicted of smuggling guns. Having been the main witness in the trial of a leading Provisional Irish Republican Army member in the early 1990s, Robb subsequently made a number of allegations about collusion between the British security forces and the loyalist paramilitaries. He later died in violent circumstances.

== Ulster Volunteer Force ==
Robb, who was working as a graphic designer at the time, made the headlines, albeit without his name being revealed, in 1993 when he gave evidence at the trial of Colin Duffy, who was charged with the murder of Ulster Defence Regiment (UDR) soldier John Lyness. Robb's evidence helped to ensure a guilty verdict for Duffy, who was handed a life sentence. Robb had provided the evidence anonymously and appeared in court behind a curtain during the trial. Robb was identified only as "Witness C" during the trial.

However, Robb first came to prominence with the PUP, serving as a member of their negotiations team during the early stages of the Northern Ireland peace process. Along with Jackie Mahood, the commander of the UVF in north Belfast, Robb was one of two members of the PUP/UVF talks delegation seen as being close to UVF Mid-Ulster Brigade commander Billy Wright who at the time was regarded as one of the main "hawks" within the UVF leadership. A rumour even circulated at the time that Robb, acting under orders from Wright, had been passing on details of the PUP's meetings to Ian Paisley in an attempt to damage UVF cohesion. Nonetheless, both Robb and Mahood were present at Stormont Castle during the first round of talks with British government representatives soon after the loyalist ceasefire.

Robb was arrested in Scotland soon after the Combined Loyalist Military Command (CLMC) ceasefire for his role in the smuggling of weapons for the UVF. During the subsequent trial, the court was told that Robb led a double life, combining his political activism with a role as a travelling fundraiser for the UVF around Scottish pubs and Orange halls. From his base in the "Tam Bain" pub in Laurieston, Falkirk, Robb had recruited a gang of supporters to help him smuggle arms into Northern Ireland. Robb had visited Liverpool, where he purchased guns, but was followed by police who eventually stopped Robb and arrested him in Airdrie. The PUP initially claimed that Robb had been set up as part of a sting operation by the intelligence services, although the arrest and subsequent trial of a member of their talks delegation proved embarrassing for the party. Robb and Billy Wright, who was in custody at the same time, were described as "loyalist hostages" in an article in UVF magazine Combat published at that time.

In 1995 he was sentenced by a Glasgow court to ten years' imprisonment for his role in the gun-running. Initially serving his sentence in Scotland, where he had been tried, Robb was eventually transferred to HMP Maghaberry where he left the UVF and declared his allegiance to the breakaway Loyalist Volunteer Force (LVF) which had been founded by Wright after he and his Portadown unit had been stood down by the UVF Brigade Staff on 2 August 1996. He changed in his physical appearance from being conservative and clean-cut to "someone who looked like a shaven-headed, muscle-bound thug". According to the Daily Record during his spells in HMP Perth and HMP Barlinnie Robb established himself as one of the main drug dealers in both prisons. Robb's conviction was used by Colin Duffy's lawyer Rosemary Nelson to get her client's life sentence overturned, with the evidence provided by Robb ruled to be unreliable. Nelson argued that Robb had been dishonest and therefore unreliable as he had consistently denied any knowledge of the UVF and yet had been under surveillance by the security forces for some time for his work on behalf of that organisation in Scotland where he had settled after the Duffy trial.

== Post-release ==
Under the terms of the Belfast Agreement he was released from prison early in 1999. Robb was the first LVF-aligned prisoner to be released under the terms of the Agreement. Returning to Scotland following his release, Robb married barmaid Margaret McLean in Gretna Green and settled in the country. He moved with his family to Airdrie and worked as a gardener. Robb had briefly worked on a building site but had been fired after Catholic co-workers complained about his loyalist tattoos, whilst he also saw himself banned from Ibrox Park, the home of Rangers F.C., after spitting at a rival fan and shouting sectarian abuse at Celtic F.C. striker Pierre van Hooijdonk. In 2000 he applied for a place in Stirling University although he was refused entry when his paramilitary past came to light.

In 2000 Robb gave an interview to the Sunday Herald in which he claimed the Royal Ulster Constabulary (RUC) had colluded with loyalists to ensure the imprisonment of Duffy. He claimed that the RUC had approached the UVF in Lurgan asking them to provide a fake witness who would testify that Duffy had been at the scene of Lyness's murder. He added that he had been paid £2000 by the RUC for providing the testimony as well as a weapon for personal protection. Robb's claims were endorsed by senior figures within the UVF, who confirmed that they were keen to get rid of Duffy and felt that the deal implied that the police would "go easy" on the UVF Mid-Ulster Brigade. As well as this work for Special Branch, Robb was also said to have been an agent for MI5 with the codename "Applejuice", and was alleged to have been sympathetic towards neo-Nazism. The judge at his trial, Lord Sutherland had described Robb as the "spider at centre of a web of intrigue".

== Death ==
Robb died at the end of 2005 after being stabbed in what was described as a "frenzied attack" in the east end of Glasgow. Robb had been waiting in his Ford Fiesta car on Gartloch Road in the Ruchazie area outside an off-licence when he was subjected to what Strathclyde Police investigating officer Detective Chief Inspector Alan Buchanan described as a "vicious" attack. The assault was witnessed by many people in the area at the time including children. Robb had tried to run away, screaming out "Help me, help me, I'm dying" as he vainly attempted to ward off the knife-wielding attacker who tripped him up, and then stabbed him 22 times as he lay on the ground. His body was found dumped around half a mile away from where the attack initially occurred. The killing took place at 5:30 pm on 31 December 2005.

Robb was rumoured to have been carrying a substantial sum of money at the time he was killed. According to a local resident, it had been a robbery gone wrong, with Robb "known for flashing his cash".

Glasgow native Brian Tollett appeared in court the following January charged with killing Robb. Tollett, a 29-year-old former soldier with the Royal Fusiliers who had served in the Balkans and who claimed to be suffering from post-traumatic stress disorder as a result, was found guilty of culpable homicide and sentenced to seven years imprisonment. The court determined that Tollett had killed Robb after the two fought over a £140 drug debt and that Robb had been stabbed as part of a physical struggle between the two men.
