= The Troubles in Portadown =

Conflict in Portadown, Northern Ireland

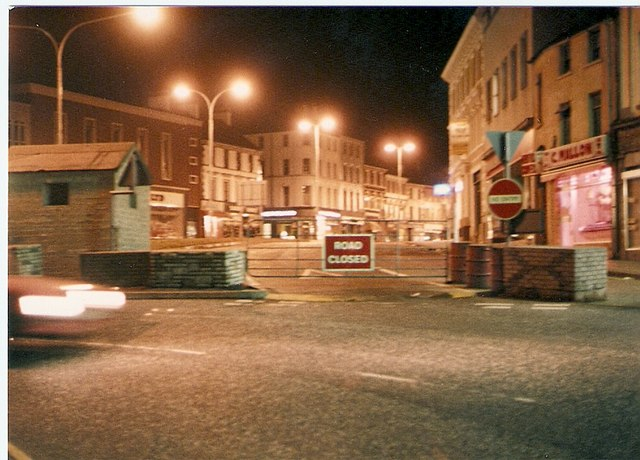
Security barriers blocking entrance to Portadown town centre in 1982

This article recounts the violence and other effects related to The Troubles in Portadown, County Armagh, Northern Ireland, which lasted from the 1960s to 1998. Much of these events have been related specifically to the Drumcree parade dispute but relate more generally to the violence and conflict between the Protestant/Unionist/Loyalist majority and the Catholic/Nationalist/Republican minority within the town.

== Overview ==
Portadown is located in an area known during the troubles as the "murder triangle" because of the high number of killings carried out by paramilitary organisations on both sides. The town is the site of an annual parade in July by an ex-servicemen's lodge of the Protestant Orange Order, from St Mark's Church in the town centre, where participants lay wreaths at the war memorial. Particularly since the nineteenth century, Protestant participants marched to Drumcree Church through the predominantly Catholic nationalist Obins Street (also known as the "Tunnel" area because of an underground walkway connecting it to a higher level at the bottom of Fowler's Entry/Mary Street/John Street).

In the 1970s and 1980s residents of the Obins Street area objected to the Orange marches, claiming they were triumphalist and arguing that they marked the Catholics as being second-class citizens in Northern Ireland.

The Orange parade leading to Drumcree Parish Church of Ireland originally passed through Obins Street but was rerouted in the mid-1980s through the then lesser populated but nearby area of Garvaghy Road. It was an effort to forestall violence.

In the interim, however, fresh housing stock had been built on the former McGredy's Rose fields on the Garvaghy Road. It was occupied by a cross-section of families from both religious denominations. But slum clearance in Obins Street resulted in many Catholic residents being relocated to the new housing. Following sectarian intimidation by each of the religious/ethnic communities in various housing estates in the town, some residents moved and the Garvaghy Road estates became nearly 100% Catholic.

The parade was one of three which had been staged by the Orange Order to march through the Tunnel and was the scene of rioting from as early as 1873. In the modern troubles, this flashpoint became the source of confrontation between the Catholics of the Tunnel area and Protestants from neighbouring Edgarstown, often exacerbated by men from other areas within the town reinforcing the numbers on either side. On several occasions in the 1970s, gun battles took place between the locals and the Royal Ulster Constabulary attempting to control the violence.

== Areas of interest and flashpoints ==
- Edgarstown: a small Protestant enclave of Georgian terraced houses to the west of the town centre, scene of much rioting.
- Brownstown: initially a mixed estate, built postwar, slightly west of the town centre on the site of a former prisoner-of-war camp. It became predominantly Protestant through polarisation of the sects.
- Redmanville/Corcrain: two estates built over several decades on the western edge of the town had very mixed populations and largely avoided the ghettoisation of many of the town's other estates.
- Killicomaine: A largely Protestant estate on the northeastern edge of town. The few Catholics who did live here were intimidated and forced out of their homes during the worst of the Troubles.
- Edenderry: A largely Protestant urban area of mixed Georgian terraces and Victorian townhouses to the east of the River Bann. Part of this area was blocked off by the Ulster Defence Association (UDA) but cleared during Operation Motorman.
- Obins Street: Also known as the Tunnel; running north west but linked to the town centre by Woodhouse Street and continuing onto the Dungannon Road. This was a largely Catholic enclave of terraced Georgian housing, much of which was demolished during "slum" clearances. The residents were decanted into new housing on the Garvaghy Road estates.
- Garvaghy Road: an area of new, mixed housing, running northwest of the town centre, built mainly on the site of the former "McGredy's Roses" growing area. This also takes in the earlier "Churchill Park" estate built by Portadown Borough Council prior to the formation of the "Northern Ireland Housing Executive". Both estates were filled by Protestants and Catholics who had been moved from "slum clearance" areas such as John Street, Mary Street, Fowlers Entry, West Street and Obins Street during the 1960s and early 1970s. As it became mainly Catholic in the early to mid-1970s, the Protestants mostly relocated to housing vacated by Catholic families in Protestant estates, such as Killicomaine, where similar intimidation had forced Catholics out.
- Rectory Park: A Protestant estate on the outskirts of the town that saw its fair share of trouble during the 1980s and 90s. The stand-off of the late 1980s between the Orangemen and RUC, over the latter's blocking the Orange Order from travelling along Obins Street to Corcrain, spilled the estate into violence. Members of the RUC were forced to leave their homes, and their counterparts faced extensive rioting inside the estate. The strong UDA presence in the estate brought further violence during the late 90s, catalyzed by the Drumcree conflict. Roads were once again barricaded, both on Northway and Brownstown Road. The British Army and RUC came under great pressure and had to re-route their forces to Drumcree. Rectory Park was also the home for two Loyalist Volunteer Force (LVF) Leaders: Billy Wright and Mark 'Swinger' Fulton. They had split from the paramilitary Ulster Volunteer Force.

During the late 1960s and up to the mid-1970s, the Edgarstown and Obins Street areas were separated only by a wasteland. It had formerly been devoted to railway lines and the railway marshalling and repair facility, which had dominated the area for many years. Civil engineering projects, such as new roads and housing, eventually were developed in this area but in the interim, it became a venue for civil disturbance between the rival factions of the two areas, who clashed on the site.

== Loyalists ==
Portadown is a predominantly Protestant town and ancestral home of the Orange Order. Other loyalist organisations were strongly represented in the town during the Troubles such as: the Ulster Volunteer Force (UVF), the Ulster Defence Association (UDA) and the Ulster Freedom Fighters (UFF).

A separate splinter group was later formed out of the Mid-Ulster UVF, called the Loyalist Volunteer Force, the leader of this was called Billy Wright (known by the press as "King Rat"), who was resident in the Rectory Park Estate. He was later imprisoned at HMP Maze, where he was assassinated. The Loyalist Volunteer Force (LVF) had been formed in 1996; due to the views held by Wright, his old counterparts in the UVF had placed a death threat on his head. The mainstream UDA and UFF had also broken with Wright. The only allies Wright and the LVF had, was the support of a small section of the UFF based on Shankill Road in Belfast. Johnny Adair was the leader of C Company UFF, part of the West Belfast Brigade. Both these groups lost their support quickly and were almost defunct by 2007.

Wright was shot dead by a member of the Irish National Liberation Army (INLA) in December 1997, rather than by loyalist competitors. He was later replaced by his sidekick Mark "Swinger" Fulton. Fulton was also convicted and imprisoned for terrorist acts; he committed suicide in prison. The feud between the UVF and LVF lasted for many years after Wright's murder. Many innocent people, such as Protestant teenagers Andrew Robb and David McIlwaine, became victims. Some high-profile members of the UVF also suffered attacks, such as the commander at the time: Richard Jameson. Loyalists ran a social club in the former Summerson's Cinema in Bridge Street for several years during the early part of the Troubles, before it was closed down by police.

== The police and military ==
=== Police ===
The Royal Ulster Constabulary (RUC) initially had two stations in Portadown; one at the "Tunnel" entrance to Obins Street and the other at Edward Street. The former closed in the 1950s. The latter remained the main centre of police operations throughout the Troubles. It has since been closed and the road block removed. Police operations have been transferred to the Mahon Road complex.

=== Military ===
Portadown had no regular military presence but maintained a small Territorial Army base at Charles Street (known as "Charlies Walls") which housed HQ Company of the 4th Battalion Royal Irish Rangers. Although this did house small numbers of troops in the early part of the Troubles, the main military presence was from units based outside Portadown, such as Kitchen Hill Barracks in Lurgan. With the formation of the 11th Battalion, Ulster Defence Regiment, a small barracks was built on the southern edge of town at Mahon Road ,on a greenfield site. This was dubbed "Fort Mahon" by the Ulster Defence Regiment (UDR) but it was officially known as the Mahon Road Barracks.

== Notable incidents in Portadown during the Troubles ==
=== 1970s ===
1972

- 11 March 1972: Thousands of loyalists attended an Ulster Vanguard rally in the town, which was addressed by Martin Smyth ('Grand Master' of the Orange Order) and the mayor of Portadown. After the rally, loyalists attacked the Catholic neighbourhood around Obins Street, known as "The Tunnel".
- 27-29 March 1972: Ulster Vanguard organized a general strike in protest at the suspension of Stormont. Loyalists sealed-off and took control of Portadown. Catholic-owned businesses were attacked and looted, and the Tunnel district was said to be "under siege". During and following the strike, many families were forced out of their homes.
- 5 June 1972: There were sectarian clashes on Corcrain Road, Portadown. The British Army and RUC came under automatic fire from republicans. A youth was shot in the leg and five RUC officers were hurt in the clashes.
- 9 July 1972: Catholics sealed-off Obins Street with makeshift barricades to prevent Orangemen marching through the area. When British troops bulldozed the barricades, they were stoned by Catholic protesters. The troops responded by firing CS gas and rubber bullets. Once the area was secured, the soldiers allowed the 1,200 Orangemen to march along the road, escorted by at least fifty masked and uniformed UDA members armed with clubs.
- 12 July 1972: A Protestant civilian, Paul Beattie (19), was shot dead in Churchill Park. Assertions that he was in the UDA were denied by his family and the organisation. Hours later, a UDA member (and former police officer) shot dead two people in McCabe's Bar: the Catholic owner, Jack McCabe, and a Protestant patron, William Cochrane.
- 15 July 1972: A Catholic civilian, Felix Hughes (35), was kidnapped, beaten, tortured, and shot dead by the UDA in Portadown. His body was found on 4 August in a drainage ditch at Hoy's Meadow, off Watson Street.
- 21 July 1972: Ten wagons of a goods train were derailed near Portadown after an IRA bomb exploded as the train passed a level-crossing.
- 22 July 1972: A loyalist bomb destroyed St Joseph's Catholic church in the Edenderry area of Portadown.
- 31 August 1972: A Catholic civilian, Eamon McMahon (19), was found dead in the River Bann at Portadown. He had been tied up and beaten to death by members of the UDA.
- 5 September 1972: A loyalist car bomb exploded outside a Catholic-owned pub, McGurk's, at the junction of Bridge Street and High Street. It killed an off-duty UDR soldier, Victor Smyth (54), who was driving past when the bomb went off.
- 4 October 1972: A Catholic civilian, Patrick Connolly (23), was killed when the UVF threw a grenade into his house on Deramore Drive. His mother and brother were wounded. The attack has been linked to the Glenanne gang.

1973

- 6 January 1973: Loyalists threw a grenade into the home of a Catholic priest on Killycomain Road. The housekeeper was badly wounded when struck in the chest by shrapnel.
- 18 January 1973: A Catholic civilian, Joseph Henry Weir (48), was shot dead by the UVF after leaving a pub near Magowan Buildings.
- 25 January 1973: A loyalist car bomb exploded outside Brankin's Bar on Obins Street, injuring at least three people. Disorder erupted when the security forces arrived; later the IRA fired on a British Army patrol in the area.
- 12 May 1973 : A Catholic civil servant from Portadown, John F McCormac on a home visit in the Falls area of West Belfast, was shot 7 times; he died 2 days later on 14 May, his 30th birthday. The UFF claimed the murder; their first official murder claim through media. Many years later this murder, and many others, was confessed to by loyalist Frankie Curry, in an article published posthumously after his own death on 17 March 1999.
- 14 May 1973: A Protestant civilian, Roy Rutherford (33), was killed when he triggered an IRA booby-trap bomb hidden in a derelict cottage on Moy Road. The bomb was intended for the security forces.
- 31 May 1973: A 30-pound bomb exploded on High Street during the afternoon, causing extensive damage to shops.
- 18 August 1973: A Protestant civilian, Trevor Holland (36), was killed in a drive-by shooting while standing outside a café on West Street. Two Catholic men were convicted of manslaughter. The judge accepted defence claims that the two men had fired the shot to scare Holland rather than kill him.
- 23 August 1973: A 200-pound UVF car bomb exploded outside the Parkside Bar (Hagan's Bar) on Obins Street. The blast badly damaged the pub and neighbouring houses, injuring at least six people. Residents called for the street to be sealed off to prevent further attacks.

1974

- 16 April 1974: A UVF member, Joseph Neil (25), died when a bomb he was handling prematurely exploded in a house on Union Street.
- 27 October 1974: A Catholic civilian, Anthony Duffy (18), was found shot dead in a farmyard off Mullantine Road. He had been beaten, strangled, and shot by UVF members after taking a lift from Lurgan to Portadown. He had been traveling with a friend who managed to escape. The attack has been linked to the Glenanne gang.

1975

- 6 March 1975: A Protestant civilian, Edward Clayton (27), was killed by a booby-trap bomb attached to his car near his home at Bognor Terrace. Two weeks earlier the car had been stolen from Brownlow Community Centre and used in the killing of a Catholic.
- 1 April 1975: The UVF shot Protestant civilian Dorothy Trainor (52) dead, and wounded her Catholic husband as they walked through a park near Garvaghy Road. Two of their sons were members of the INLA. The attack has been linked to the Glenanne gang.
- 3 April 1975: A Catholic civilian, Martin McVeigh (22), was shot dead by the UVF in Ballyoran Park as he cycled home from work. The attack has been linked to the Glenanne gang.
- 25 April 1975: Samuel Johnston (33), was shot dead on Bachelor's Walk. It is believed that IRA members shot him from a passing car. Some sources identify Johnston as a UDA operative, but CAIN lists him as a civilian.
- 22 September 1975: Two RUC officers were wounded by an IRA booby-trap bomb attached to a security barrier on Church Street. One of them, Andrew Baird (37), died of his wounds on 14 October.
- 15 December 1975: The UVF carried out a gun and bomb attack on the home of a republican at Ballyoran Park. Irish Republican Socialist Party (IRSP) member Ronald Trainor (17) was killed and six other people were wounded.

1976

- 25 January 1976: A Protestant civilian, Samuel Neill (29), was found dead in the Edgarstown area of Portadown. He had been shot as a purported informer.
- 7 February 1976: A 14-year-old Catholic, Thomas Rafferty, was killed when he triggered an INLA booby-trap bomb hidden behind derelict cottages on Derryall Road. The bomb was intended for the security forces.
- 18 September 1976: An RUC officer, Albert Craig (33), was shot dead by the IRA while directing traffic on Brownstown Road. Another officer was wounded.
- 11 October 1976: A Catholic civilian, Peter Woolsey (39), was shot dead by the UVF at his farm in Cornascreeb. The attack has been linked to the Glenanne gang.
- 12 December 1976: A small bomb exploded in the Yachtsman Inn on Woodhouse Street, during a Catholic wedding reception. It blew a hole in the roof and injured almost 50 people, six of them seriously.
- 15 December 1976: An RUC officer, Norman Campbell (19), was shot dead by the IRA while manning a security barrier on High Street.
- 18 December 1976: A Protestant civilian, James Liggett (67), was shot by the INLA at the Tavern Bar in Edenderry and died on 29 December. He was the pub's security guard and had been trying to stop a bomb attack on the pub.

1977

- 1 March 1977: A magistrate, Robert Whitten (73), was shot by the INLA while walking along Thomas Street. He died on 29 June. He was the brother of Unionist politician Herbert Whitten. A young INLA member, whose mother and brother had reportedly been killed by loyalists, was convicted of two counts of manslaughter: of Whitten and James Liggett.

1978

- 8 March 1978: The UVF shot dead INLA member Thomas Trainor (29) and Catholic civilian Denis Kelly (31) as they walked along Armagh Road. The shots were fired from a passing motorcycle.

1979

- 6 March 1979: An INLA booby-trap bomb exploded underneath the car of a UDR soldier on West Street. The soldier, Robert McNally (20), died on 13 March.
- 30 March 1979: A Catholic civilian, Martin McConville (25), was kidnapped and beaten to death by loyalists in Portadown. His body was found in the River Bann at Seagoe on 22 April.
- 27-28 July 1979: A former RUC officer and Orangeman, James Wright (48), was killed by an INLA booby-trap bomb attached to his car at his home on Corcrain Drive. The next day the UVF killed a Catholic civilian, James McCann (20), in a drive-by shooting on Obins Street.

=== 1980s ===
1980

- 10 October 1980: An off-duty UDR soldier, James Hewitt (48), was killed by an IRA booby-trap bomb attached to his car on Tandragee Road, Portadown. He was a member of the Ulster Unionist Party.

1981

- 26 January 1981: A car bomb exploded in Portadown town centre, injuring three UDR soldiers and seven civilians, and damaging 16 shops.

1983

- 20 September 1983: A former UDR soldier, John Truckle (61), was killed by an IRA booby-trap bomb attached to his car outside his home at Woodside Hill.

1985

- July 1985: On 7 July, hundreds of Catholic residents held a sit-down protest on Obins Street to prevent Orangemen marching through the area. Riot police forcefully removed the protesters and allowed the march to continue. At least one man was beaten unconscious by police, and many were arrested. On 12 July, Orangemen and loyalists again tried to march along Obins Street. When they were blocked by police, hundreds of loyalists gathered and attacked police lines for several hours. These clashes resumed the following evening, and loyalists attacked police with ball bearings fired from slingshots. In the two-day clashes, at least 52 police officers and 28 rioters were injured, 37 people were arrested (including two UDR soldiers), and about 50 Catholic-owned homes and businesses were attacked. After this, police erected a barrier at each end of Obins Street.

1986

- 1 April 1986: At 1am, at least 3,000 loyalists gathered in the town centre, forced their way past a small group of police, and marched through the Catholic district. Among them was Ian Paisley. Residents claimed some of the marchers were carrying guns and were known to be members of the police and UDR. Some of the marchers attacked houses along the route, and residents claimed the police did little or nothing to stop this. The march ended with a riot between residents, marchers and police. That afternoon, during a loyalist Apprentice Boys march in the town centre, loyalists attacked police, who had sealed off Obins Street. A Protestant boy, Keith White, was shot in the face with a plastic bullet and died in hospital on 14 April.
- 3 July 1986:

1988

- 13 December 1988: A Protestant, John Corry (31), was shot dead by the IRA at his garage on Foundry Street. He was a contractor to the British Army and RUC.

=== 1990s ===
1991

- 21 June 1991: Margaret Perry (26), disappears. Her body is found a year later after a tip by the IRA, who claim she was beaten to death by her boyfriend after she became aware that he was a double agent spying on the IRA. The boyfriend and two others were later tortured and shot dead in retaliation.

1992

- 4 March 1992: A Catholic civilian, James Gray (39), was shot dead by the UVF while driving his lorry at Cornascreeb.
- 29 March 1992: A Catholic civilian, Terence McConville (43), was shot dead by the UVF at his home on Bann Street.
- 19 November 1992: An off-duty British soldier, Ian Warnock (27), was shot dead by the IRA while sitting in his car outside the Moypark factory near Portadown.

1993

- 22 May 1993: A 1,000 pound (450 kg) car bomb devastated Portadown town centre. It had been planted by the IRA and exploded after a telephoned warning. Six people were injured and an estimated £8 million worth of damage was caused.

1994

- 11 March 1994: A Catholic civilian, Francis Brown (38), father of 4 (Karen, Anthony, Francis, Kelly-ann), was killed when a UVF booby-trap bomb exploded under his lorry. He was surrounded by a daughter and other relatives on Obins Street.

1997

- 27 April 1997: Robert Hamill (25), Gregory Girvan, Siobhan Girvan and Joanne Girvan, all Catholic civilians, were walking home through Portadown's main street when they were confronted by a gang of thirty loyalists. The men attacked the two men and, according to Amnesty International in their report The Sectarian Killing of Robert Hamill, the group continued to kick Hamill while he lay on the ground, shouting sectarian abuse such as "Die you Fenian bastard!". Hamill went into a coma and died in hospital on 8 May. The Girvan women were not harmed. The report stated that four RUC officers sitting in their jeep about 20 feet from the attack did not intervene or go to help the victims.

In November 2004, Secretary of State for Northern Ireland Paul Murphy, announced the terms of reference for an investigation into these events. These were outlined as follows; -To inquire into the death of Robert Hamill with a view to determining whether any wrongful act or omission by or within the Royal Ulster Constabulary facilitated his death or obstructed the investigation of it, or whether attempts were made to do so; whether any such act or omission was intentional or negligent; whether the investigation of his death was carried out with due diligence; and to make recommendations. for the inquiry into Robert Hamill's death. This was addressed in the Cory Collusion Inquiry Report published in 2004.

1998

- 23 February 1998: A 300-pound car bomb exploded near the RUC base on Edward Street. It exploded after a telephoned warning, causing widespread damage to the town centre but no injuries. The bomb was planted by dissident republicans.
- 21 April 1998: Catholic civilian, Adrian Lamph (29), was shot dead by the LVF at his workplace, the Fairgreen amenity site on Duke Street. He was the first victim of the conflict since the signing of the Good Friday Agreement.
- 5 September 1998: Catholic RUC officer, Francis O'Reilly (30), was wounded by a blast bomb thrown by loyalist rioters on Charles Street. He died on 6 October.

1999

- 5 June 1999: A Protestant civilian, Elizabeth O'Neill (59), was killed in an LVF pipe bomb attack on her home at Corcrain Drive. She was married to a Catholic and lived in a mainly Protestant area. A pipe bomb also exploded at another Catholic home nearby.
