= Killing of Gavin Brett =

2001 sectarian killing in Northern Ireland

- Location: Glengormley, County Antrim, Northern Ireland
- Date: 29 July 2001; 11:20 pm

On 29 July 2001, Gavin Brett, an 18‑year‑old from Glengormley, County Antrim, Northern Ireland, was shot dead in a drive‑by attack outside a GAA club. The Red Hand Defenders claimed responsibility, and police recovered a burnt‑out car linked to the shooting. Although arrests were made and one man was charged with withholding information, no one has been convicted and the case remains unsolved.

== Background ==
Gavin Brett was an 18‑year‑old Protestant from Glengormley, County Antrim, Northern Ireland. He was from a mixed‑religion family; his father, Michael Brett, was a Catholic and a paramedic at Mater Hospital in Belfast, and his mother, Phyllis, is a Protestant. He was the eldest of three children, with a sister, Tara, and a brother, Phillip, who is a DUP MLA for North Belfast. At the time of his death, Brett had just finished secondary school and was waiting for his A‑level results.

== Killing ==
At around 11.30 pm on 29 July 2001, Brett was standing with friends outside St Enda's Gaelic Athletic Association club on the Hightown Road in Glengormley when a dark saloon car travelled towards them from the direction of the Upper Hightown Road. As it passed, an occupant fired several shots in their direction before the vehicle continued on towards Glengormley. Brett was struck twice. His parents were alerted by phone by a nurse who lived on the family's estate. His father went to the scene and gave him CPR, but Brett was later pronounced dead. His best friend, Michael Farrell, had been shot in the ankle and was taken to hospital.

=== Reactions ===
The Royal Ulster Constabulary (RUC) chief constable, Sir Ronnie Flanagan, said the gunmen targeted "defenceless youngsters they would have assumed to be Catholics".

Ulster Unionist leader David Trimble said he was "shocked and appalled". UUP South Antrim MP David Burnside said society appeared to be entering "a cycle of violence and counter‑violence", which he described as "very worrying".

David Ervine of the Progressive Unionist Party, which is linked to the Ulster Volunteer Force (UVF), criticised those responsible, describing their actions as "idiocy and shame". Sinn Féin leader Gerry Adams said he was prepared to meet UDA loyalist paramilitaries if it would help to end the violence, and urged unionist leaders to declare their opposition to the sectarian attacks and to meet "the loyalist organisation that is involved".

English composer Andrew Lloyd Webber, who had been on holiday in Ireland, visited the Brett family home, as did the South African Archbishop Desmond Tutu.

== Investigation and aftermath ==
On 30 July 2001, the Red Hand Defenders, a loyalist group associated with the Ulster Defence Association (UDA) and the Loyalist Volunteer Force (LVF), issued a statement claiming responsibility for the killing and said its campaign would "increase in ferocity", citing "the existing denial of civil rights for Protestants" as the justification. That same day, a dark blue Vauxhall Nova saloon was found burnt out behind shops at Ballyearl Drive in New Mossley, and police later said it was linked to the investigation. On 31 July, hundreds of people from both communities took part in a candlelight vigil at the location where Brett was killed.

Brett's funeral took place on 1 August at the Church of the Holy Evangelists in Carnmoney, near Belfast. More than 100 of his father's paramedic colleagues travelled in ambulances as part of the cortege, and the hearse paused outside St Enda's GAA club where he was shot. Several hundred people stood along the route, and ambulance personnel formed a guard of honour as the funeral reached the church. During the service, the Reverend Nigel Baylor said the killing had brought "shame on the name of Protestantism", adding that "all they succeeded in doing was to deny a Protestant his civil right and to deny all Protestants their civil rights". On 3 August, the RUC announced that it had arrested two men from Carrickfergus. The following day, one of the men was charged with withholding information, and the other was released.

In July 2002, Gerard Lawlor, a 19‑year‑old Catholic, was also shot and killed by the Red Hand Defenders in north Belfast.

A plaque was unveiled outside the club where Brett was killed in May 2004. His father died from liver cancer on 27 June 2007, aged 51. In a 2009 interview, Brett's mother said that his father "never really forgave himself" and carried guilt over being unable to save him.

In 2011, the PSNI announced that it had reviewed the case and that detectives from its serious crime branch would now investigate it. A 32-year-old man was arrested in the West Midlands in relation to the killings of Brett and Gary Moore in March 2013, but was later released unconditionally.

== See also ==
- Rosemary Nelson
- Robert Hamill
