= Red Hand Defenders =

Loyalist paramilitary organisation in Northern Ireland

- Leader: Unknown
- Dates active: September 1998 onwards (current status unknown)
- Active regions: Northern Ireland
- Ideology: Ulster loyalism

The Red Hand Defenders (RHD) is an Ulster loyalist paramilitary group in Northern Ireland. It was formed in 1998 by loyalists who opposed the Belfast Agreement and the loyalist ceasefires. Its members were drawn mostly from the Ulster Defence Association (UDA) and Loyalist Volunteer Force (LVF). The name had first been used by Red Hand Commandos dissident Frankie Curry in 1996 and he was the leading figure in what was a somewhat unstructured organisation until he was killed in 1999. It is named after the Red Hand of Ulster.

The RHD emerged when it claimed responsibility for a blast bomb attack on 7 September 1998 during a loyalist protest in Portadown. Loyalists had been protesting against the decision to ban the Orange Order from marching through the town's mainly Catholic and Irish nationalist quarter (see Drumcree conflict). The attack killed a Catholic Royal Ulster Constabulary (RUC) officer. Since then, the RHD has claimed responsibility for killing a further ten people. It has also claimed responsibility for many pipe bomb attacks, mostly on the homes of Catholics. One of the RHD's most notable attacks was the assassination of human rights lawyer Rosemary Nelson on 15 March 1999. She had represented alleged Irish republican paramilitaries, the family of Robert Hamill, and the Garvaghy Road Residents Association. Of the eleven people the RHD claimed to have killed, nine were civilians, one was a former UDA member and one was an RUC officer.

The RHD are a Proscribed Organisation in the United Kingdom under the Terrorism Act 2000.

== Links with the wider loyalist movement ==
It has been alleged that the name "Red Hand Defenders" is merely a covername for members of the Loyalist Volunteer Force (LVF) and Ulster Defence Association (UDA) so the organisations can claim on the surface to have honoured their ceasefire agreements. Similar accusations have been made regarding the name "Orange Volunteers", another loyalist paramilitary group that emerged in 1998. Claims of responsibility by the RHD for certain attacks have overlapped with those of the Orange Volunteers. The Council on Foreign Relations indicates the membership of the RHD, LVF and Orange Volunteers likely overlap. These organisations are generally composed of young Ulster Protestant males from Northern Ireland.

In 2001 Henry McDonald characterised the LVF and UDA ceasefire agreements as "official fiction". The LVF denied these claims, stating that its armed campaign had ended. LVF members were aware that any breach of the ceasefire could result in the return to jail for those paramilitary prisoners freed as part of the Good Friday Agreement of April 1998. This essentially served as an incentive for the groups to create a cover name. As a result, the actual existence of the RHD has consistently been called into question. Jim Cusack and Henry McDonald have argued that the RHD and the Orange Volunteers are both overseen by a Christian fundamentalist preacher they identify only as the Pastor. The Pastor, a former associate of William McGrath, John McKeague and George Seawright and a long-established British intelligence agent, is said by the authors to provide his own form of fundamentalist, anti-Catholic Protestantism to the two groups' fluid membership of young men, most of whom are also UDA or LVF members.

== Ideology and modus operandi ==
The Red Hand Defenders use violence toward the goal of maintaining British control in Northern Ireland. Like other loyalist groups, the RHD is an adversary of Irish nationalists who seek to remove Northern Ireland from the United Kingdom and create a united Ireland. In essence, (mostly) Irish Catholic nationalists aspire to be part of the Republic of Ireland, while (mostly) Protestant unionists wish to remain united with Great Britain. The resulting long-term conflict in Northern Ireland was often referred to as "the Troubles". However, unlike the two biggest loyalist paramilitary groups—the Ulster Defence Association and Ulster Volunteer Force—the group fully opposes the peace process and peace agreements, including the Good Friday Agreement.

Their tactics include shootings, bombings and arson, with victims usually being Catholic civilians. The religious emphasis has exacerbated the underlying political problems. The group's civilian targets have included Catholic schools and Catholic postal workers. The weapons used by RHD members include pipe bombs, handguns and grenades. The group does not appear to receive aid from outside the UK.

== Notable attacks ==
The RHD emerged when it claimed responsibility for a blast bomb attack on 7 September 1998 during a loyalist protest in Portadown. The loyalists had been protesting against the decision to ban the Orange Order from marching through the town's mainly Irish Catholic and Irish nationalist quarter (see Drumcree conflict). The attack killed a Catholic Royal Ulster Constabulary (RUC) officer. Since then, the RHD has claimed responsibility for killing a further ten people. Of the eleven people the RHD claimed to have killed, nine were civilians, one was a former UDA member and one was an RUC officer. The group admitted shooting to death a Catholic man, Brian Service, while he was walking home in North Belfast on 31 October 1998, and to an attack on a pub in West Belfast earlier that day.

One of the RHD's most notable attacks was the assassination of human rights lawyer Rosemary Nelson on 15 March 1999. She had represented alleged Irish republican paramilitaries, the family of Robert Hamill, and the Garvaghy Road Residents Association. Nelson had been working with Prime Minister Tony Blair toward resolving the conflict in Northern Ireland. She had also testified in Washington, D.C. about the plight of attorneys who were subjected to harassment and threats for representing Irish nationalists. Nelson further informed that she and her family had received death threats. The killing of Nelson was a significant setback to the peace process due to a fear of the need for retaliation. Moreover, this killing was the first high-profile assassination since the 1998 Good Friday Agreement.

In August 2001, the RHD claimed responsibility for an attempted pipe-bomb attack on a Sinn Féin Member of Parliament and an attempted car bomb attack at a fair shortly thereafter where streets were filled with civilians, though both plots were thwarted by police. The RHD also claimed responsibility for the murder of the journalist Martin O’Hagan in September 2001, who was shot dead while walking home from a pub with his wife. O'Hagan had previously been threatened by Ulster Volunteer Force brigadier Billy Wright, who became the leader of the LVF and was subsequently killed in the Maze Prison. The attack may have stemmed from the journalist's report on alleged collusion between loyalist paramilitaries and security forces in Northern Ireland.

According to the U.S. Department of State, the RHD claimed responsibility for killing a total of five individuals in 2001. In 2002, the RHD claimed responsibility for the murders of a Catholic teenager and a Catholic postman (with the UDA and the Ulster Freedom Fighters (UFF) also subsequently claiming responsibility for the attacks), and also bombed the home of a prison officer. On 16 January 2002, the RHD allegedly made a statement agreeing to "stand down" at the request of the UDA/UFF after threatening Catholic postal workers and teachers. The sincerity of the statement was immediately called into question. The RHD resumed its campaign a few months later with a nail-bomb attack on a well-known republican. The RHD successfully separated itself from the UDA in February 2003 with the murder of UDA member John Gregg, who had attempted to kill Sinn Féin president Gerry Adams almost 20 years before. The attack on Gregg may have stemmed from disapproval with the RHD that had been expressed by the UFF. The RHD is believed to have engaged in periodic bombings and shootings in 2003, and further claimed responsibility for an attack in September 2004.

=== Timeline ===
==== 1998 ====
- 5 Sep: The RHD claimed responsibility for a blast bomb attack during a riot on Charles Street, Portadown. A Catholic Royal Ulster Constabulary (RUC) officer was wounded and died on 6 October 1998.
- 31 Oct: The RHD claimed responsibility for shooting dead a Catholic civilian as he walked along Alliance Avenue, Belfast.
- 17 Dec: The RHD claimed responsibility for a blast bomb attack on a pub on Ballyganniff Road near Crumlin, County Antrim.

==== 1999 ====
- 26 Jan: The RHD claimed responsibility for an attempted pipe bomb attack on the home of a Catholic family near Carrickfergus. The family lived in a mainly Protestant estate. It failed to explode.
- 28 Jan: The RHD claimed responsibility for a pipe bomb attack on the home of a Catholic family in Dungannon.
- 2 Feb: There was a grenade attack on St Joseph's Catholic Church in Antrim. It is believed the RHD were responsible.
- 24 Feb: The RHD claimed responsibility for a pipe bomb attack on a house in Rosapenna Street, Belfast. The pipe bomb was found in the back garden of the house, which was beside a peace line.
- 15 Mar: The RHD claimed responsibility for killing Catholic human rights lawyer Rosemary Nelson. A booby-trap bomb exploded under her car in Lurgan.
- 31 Mar: The RHD claimed responsibility for an attempted pipe bomb attack on the car of a Catholic civilian in Dungannon. It failed to explode.
- 31 Mar: The RHD claimed responsibility for an attempted pipe bomb attack on a house on Gray's Lane, Belfast. It was made safe by the British Army.
- 19 Apr: The RHD claimed responsibility for an attempted pipe bomb attack on the home of a Catholic family on Serpentine Park, Belfast. It failed to explode.
- 21 May: Shots were fired at a Catholic youth worker as he escorted a Protestant girl to her home on Shankill Road, Belfast. He claimed that he had been threatened by RUC officers six months earlier. He claimed the officers wanted information on IRA members otherwise he would be killed by the RHD. The RUC denied the claims.
- 5 June: A Protestant civilian was killed in a pipe bomb attack on her home at Corcrain Drive, Portadown. It was thrown through the window and exploded as she tried to take it outside. She was married to a Catholic man and lived in a mainly Protestant area. A blast bomb also exploded at another Catholic-owned home nearby. The RHD and the LVF were blamed but the LVF denied responsibility.
- 7 June: A pipe bomb was found and defused outside St Mary's (Catholic) primary school in Ballymena. It is believed that the RHD were responsible.
- 4 Oct: The RHD claimed responsibility for throwing a pipe bomb at a Catholic taxi driver as he drove through the Peter's Hill area of Belfast. It failed to explode.
- 15 Oct: The RHD claimed responsibility for planting a hoax bomb at a Catholic-owned house in north Belfast. A family member said, "It's just to try and intimidate Catholics out of the area".
- 27 Oct: The RHD claimed responsibility for planting a pipe bomb at the home of a republican in west Belfast. It failed to explode.

==== 2001 ====
- 24 Jan: The RHD claimed responsibility for firing shots at the home of prominent republican Martin Óg Meehan (son of Sinn Féin MLA Martin Meehan) in Ardoyne, Belfast. On 29 Jan it claimed responsibility for firing shots at the home of Martin Óg Meehan's brother on the same street.
- 5 Feb: The RHD claimed responsibility for an attempted pipe bomb attack on the home of a Catholic family in Ardoyne, Belfast. The man who lived there was a former republican prisoner. It failed to explode.
- 19 Jun: The RHD issued a death threat to husband and wife Sinn Féin councillors Breige and Martin Meehan.
- 4 Jul: The RHD claimed responsibility for shooting dead a Catholic civilian as he waited for a lift to work in Antrim. The attack was a drive-by shooting by gunmen on a motorbike. In a call to a newspaper, a RHD spokesman said the teenager had been shot in "direct response to the Catholic people of Antrim voting in two Sinn Féin [councillors]. They are going to have to pay the price for it. God Save Ulster".
- 20 Jul: The RHD claimed responsibility for firing shots into Ashton Community Centre in the nationalist Ardoyne area of Belfast. There were staff and children inside at the time. In a statement, the RHD said: "all nationalist people [are] hostile and legitimate targets".
- 29 Jul: The RHD claimed responsibility for shooting dead, Gavin Brett, a Protestant civilian, as he stood outside St Enda's Gaelic Athletic Association (GAA) club in Newtownabbey. The attack was a drive-by shooting on a group of people. Brett was hit by automatic fire as he stood with his Catholic friends.
- 30 Jul: The RHD claimed responsibility for two pipe bombs that exploded outside the Golden Thread theatre at a community centre in north Belfast. Over 250 people were watching a youth theatre production inside. One woman was hospitalized for shock.
- 22 Aug: The RHD claimed responsibility for a string of bomb alerts across Northern Ireland. A suspect device was found under a van in Armagh; a pipe bomb was found at a Sinn Féin office in Cookstown; a pipe bomb was found at a GAA club in Garvagh; and a pipe bomb exploded at a GAA club in Gulladuff.
- 23 Aug: The RHD claimed responsibility for two pipe bomb attacks on the home of a Catholic family at Deerpark Parade, Belfast. It also claimed responsibility for an attempted pipe bomb attack on a GAA club in Desertmartin.
- 28 Aug: The RHD claimed responsibility for an attempted car bomb attack in the middle of Ballycastle. Thousands of people were in the town to celebrate the yearly Auld Lammas Fair. The bomb was found by the RUC and defused by the British Army.
- 29 Aug: The RHD claimed responsibility for two pipe bomb attacks on the home of a Catholic family in Ballynahinch. It also claimed to have left bombs at five pubs in Belfast and a pub and hotel in Ballycastle.
- 30 Aug: The RHD claimed responsibility for shooting a man in Coalisland.
- 5 Sep: The RHD claimed responsibility for throwing a blast bomb at a group of Catholic schoolchildren as they walked to Holy Cross Primary School on Ardoyne Road, Belfast. Local loyalists had been protesting outside the school for the past three days. Four RUC officers and a civilian were injured. The next day, it was announced that the RHD had threatened to kill the parents if they tried to bring their children to the school. See Holy Cross dispute for more information.
- 15 Sep: The RHD claimed responsibility for firing shots at a Catholic taxi driver as he drove through Parkmount Terrace, Belfast. The shots hit the car but missed the driver.
- 28 Sep: The RHD claimed responsibility for shooting dead Catholic journalist Martin O'Hagan as he walked near his home in Lurgan. He worked for the Sunday World newspaper. The RUC Chief Constable said he believed that it was carried-out by members of the LVF, which was then on ceasefire. O'Hagan had written stories about LVF activities and had been threatened by loyalists a number of times. The RHD statement said that he had been killed "for crimes against the loyalist people".
- 1 Oct: The RHD claimed responsibility for planting a bomb outside the home of republican Eddie Copeland in Ardoyne, Belfast.
- 3 Dec: The RHD claimed responsibility for shooting dead a Catholic civilian as he sat in a car on Upper Crumlin Road, Belfast.
- 12 Dec: The RHD claimed responsibility for shooting dead former UDA member William Stobie outside his home on Forthriver Road, Belfast. It was claimed he was an informer.
- 18 Dec: The RHD claimed responsibility for attempting to shoot a Catholic man at Brompton Park, Belfast. He ran off before the gun could be fired. He had recently been warned that his name was on a loyalist death list.

==== 2002 ====
- 6 Jan: The RHD claimed responsibility for a pipe bomb attack on the home of a prison officer at Westway Park, Belfast. The man's wife and daughter were wounded. The RHD said it was in response to the alleged harassment of loyalist prisoners in Maghaberry Prison.
- 11 Jan: The RHD issued a death threat against all teachers and staff working at Catholic schools in north Belfast.
- 12 Jan: The RHD claimed responsibility for shooting dead a Catholic civilian as he arrived for work at a postal sorting office in Newtownabbey. It also issued a statement saying that all Catholic postal workers were now "legitimate targets". However, the UDA later admitted that its members had been involved in the killing.
- 15 Jan: The UDA/UFF called for the RHD to stand down within fourteen days.
- 17 Apr: The RHD claimed responsibility for shooting dead a Catholic civilian as he sat in his taxi in Donaghmore, County Tyrone.
- 26 Apr: The RHD claimed responsibility for a nail bomb attack on the home of a Sinn Féin councillor.
- 22 Jul: The RHD claimed responsibility for shooting dead a Catholic civilian as he walked home on Floral Road, Belfast. Earlier in the evening, a Protestant had been shot and wounded on Alliance Avenue. The RHD said the killing of Lawlor was a "measured response" to that attack. However, the UDA/UFF later admitted that its members had been involved in the killing.
- 4 Aug: The RHD issued a death threat against Catholic workers at the Mater Hospital in Belfast and Ulster Hospital in Dundonald.
- 20 Aug: In a statement to a newspaper, the RHD threatened that "if there is one more brick thrown by Catholics at houses in Glenbryn, every resident on the upper half of Alliance Avenue will be forcibly removed from their homes".
- 24 Oct: The RHD claimed responsibility for throwing a pipe bomb into the back yard of a Catholic-owned home on Alliance Avenue, Belfast. It claimed the man who lived there was a "senior republican".
- 19 Dec: The RHD claimed responsibility for throwing a pipe bomb at the home of a Catholic family in north Belfast.

==== 2003 ====
- 6 Jan: The RHD claimed responsibility for planting a pipe bomb at the gates of Holy Cross Catholic Primary School in Belfast. It warned the school to shut permanently within one week.
- 19 May: The RHD claimed responsibility for planting an explosive device outside a Republican Sinn Féin office in west Belfast. It was defused by the British Army.
- 11 Nov: The RHD claimed responsibility for planting an explosive device outside a Catholic-owned house in north Belfast. It said it was targeting a spokesperson for the Parents of Holy Cross Primary School.

==== 2005 ====
- 13 Feb: The RHD claimed responsibility for killing a Catholic civilian. He was found unconscious with head wounds on Jamaica Road, Belfast. However, it is not certain if the RHD were responsible as no code-word was given when the claim was made.

==== 2006 ====
- 4 Mar: The RHD claimed responsibility for the attempted killing of a taxi driver in north Belfast. A man who got into the taxi pressed a handgun to the driver's head and pulled the trigger, but the gun jammed and he managed to flee.

==== 2013 ====
- 21 May: Four men linked with the Red Hand Defenders were jailed for two years and eight months for sending death threats to a couple in County Armagh back in February and March 2011. The loyalist gang demanded £15,000 from the couple and threatened paramilitary attacks if the couple did not pay them, but were arrested shortly after receiving £5,000 from the couple in Portadown.
- 6 September: RHD reportedly threatened attacks on Catholic schools in North Belfast.

== See also ==
- Orange Volunteers
- Real Ulster Freedom Fighters
