= Edwin Jowitt =

British former High Court judge (1929–2026)

Sir Edwin Frank Jowitt (1 October 1929 – 22 June 2026) was a British High Court judge. Notable cases overseen by Jowitt include the trial of the murderers of Ross Parker.

== Life and career ==
Edwin Frank Jowitt was born in Ripley, Derbyshire on 1 October 1929. He educated at Swanwick Hall School and London School of Economics, where he earned his LL.B. He was called to the bar as a member of Middle Temple in 1951. Jowitt became a Queen's Counsel in 1969 and was recorder of the Crown Court from 1972 to 1980. He was a circuit judge from 1980 to 1987 and Senior Circuit Judge and honorary Recorder of Birmingham from 1987 to 1988. He was a judge of the High Court, Queen's Bench Division, from 1988 to 2000. He was knighted in 1988. He was presiding judge of the Midland & Oxford Circuit from 1996 to 1999, was Lent reader in 1997, and became a senior bencher in January 2000.

Following the recommendation of Canadian judge Peter Cory that inquiries into murders in Northern Ireland be undertaken, Jowitt was appointed to chair the Robert Hamill Inquiry.

Jowitt died on 22 June 2026, aged 96, and was survived by his five children.
