= Michael Morland =

British judge (born 1929)

Sir Michael Morland

Justice of the High Court
- In office 17 May 1989 – 2004

Personal details
- Born: Michael Morland; 16 July 1929 (age 97)
- Children: 2
- Education: Stowe School; Christ Church, Oxford

Sir Michael Morland (born 16 July 1929) is a British barrister and retired judge. He was a Justice of the High Court (Queen's Bench Division) from 1989 to 2004. He is best remembered as the judge who tried Robert Thompson and Jon Venables for the murder of James Bulger.

== Biography ==
Educated at Stowe School and Christ Church, Oxford, Morland served in the Grenadier Guards as a second lieutenant from 1948 to 1949, seeing service in Malaya. He was called to the bar by the Inner Temple in 1953 (becoming a bencher of the inn in 1979). He then joined the Northern Circuit, becoming a Queen's Counsel in 1972.

Morland was a recorder from 1972 to 1989, when he was appointed to the High Court, receiving the customary knighthood. Assigned to the Queen's Bench Division, he was Presiding Judge of the Northern Circuit from 1991 to 1995.

In 1993, Morland tried Robert Thompson and Jon Venables for the murder of James Bulger. Upon conviction, they became the youngest convicted murderers in modern British history. Morland sentenced them to be detained at Her Majesty's pleasure, with a recommendation that they should be kept in custody for "very, very many years to come", recommending a minimum term of eight years. He also lifted the anonymity orders on the two boys after they were convicted.

Morland retired in 2004 upon reaching the statutory age. In retirement, Morland chaired the inquiry into the killing of Rosemary Nelson.

== See also ==
- Judiciary of England and Wales
