= Robert Hamill Inquiry =

2004–06 Northern Irish public inquiry

The Robert Hamill Inquiry was set up in 2004 by the then Secretary of State for Northern Ireland, Paul Murphy.

== Background ==
The Inquiry was established to investigate the death of Robert Hamill, following an incident in Portadown, County Armagh, Northern Ireland on 27 April 1997. It was set up following a recommendation by a retired Canadian judge, Justice Peter Cory, who was asked to examine a number of deaths which had occurred in Northern Ireland. Justice Cory recommended that, in each instance, a public inquiry should be held. To date, the UK government has also set up public inquiries into the deaths of Rosemary Nelson and Billy Wright, as well as the death of Robert Hamill.

The Robert Hamill Inquiry was established under the Police (Northern Ireland) Act 1998 (c. 32) and has since been converted to operate under the terms of the Inquiries Act 2005.

== Terms of reference ==
The Inquiry's terms of reference are as follows:

To inquire into the death of Robert Hamill with a view to determining whether any wrongful act or omission by or within the Royal Ulster Constabulary facilitated his death or obstructed the investigation of it, or whether attempts were made to do so; whether any such act or omission was intentional or negligent; whether the investigation of his death was carried out with due diligence; and to make recommendations.

== Key personnel ==
The inquiry's chairman is Sir Edwin Jowitt, who was a Justice of the High Court, Queen's Bench Division, from 1988 to 2000. The other members of the inquiry's panel are the Reverend Kathleen Richardson, Baroness Richardson of Calow, and Sir John Evans.

The leading counsel to the inquiry is Ashley Underwood QC. The solicitor and secretary to the inquiry is Judi Kemish.

== House of Lords judgment ==
In July 2007, the House of Lords allowed an appeal from the Robert Hamill inquiry against the decision of the Northern Ireland Court of Appeal with regard to the issue of anonymity. The inquiry's panel had dismissed applications by a number of serving and former police officers (all former members of the Royal Ulster Constabulary) for steps to be taken by the inquiry to ensure their anonymity. In each instance, the applicants had said that, without such measures, they would be exposed to an increased risk of terrorist attack.

In August 2006, the applicants applied for judicial review of the inquiry panel's ruling. They argued principally that the panel had asked itself the wrong question by declining to follow a literal interpretation of paragraph 31 of the decision of the Court of Appeal in England and Wales in R (A and others) v Lord Saville of Newdigate [2002] 1 WLR 1249 ('the Widgery Soldiers case') which concerned applications for anonymity to the Bloody Sunday Inquiry.

In February 2007, the Northern Ireland Court of Appeal quashed the inquiry panel's ruling, concluding that it had indeed applied the wrong test in reaching its decision. The inquiry applied for judicial review before the House of Lords and, in July 2007, the House of Lords allowed the inquiry's appeal on a number of grounds, including the following:

- that it would not be right to apply a literal interpretation of paragraph 31 as above
- that the panel posed the correct question under Article 2 of the European Convention on Human Rights, namely whether the existing level of threat to any of the applicants would be materially increased if they were permitted to give evidence named and unscreened from the public

== The inquiry's work ==
The inquiry began its public hearings in January 2009 and completed them in December of the same year. The inquiry heard evidence from 174 witnesses, while a further 37 witness statements were read. In all, it collated more than 20,000 documents. The cost of the inquiry up to 2011 was £33 million.

The inquiry panel is now writing up its report. On 29 January 2010, it delivered an interim report, containing one recommendation, to the Secretary of State for Northern Ireland. This report was published on 12 March 2010. The report recommended that the Director of Public Prosecutions for Northern Ireland should reconsider the decision whether or not to prosecute ex-policeman Robert Atkinson for conspiracy to pervert the course of justice. The Panel's reason for making this recommendation by way of an interim report was its recognition that, if there was to be a reconsideration of the question of prosecution, it was in the public interest that it should be treated as a matter of urgency. The Public Prosecution Service for Northern Ireland has since said it will review the decision.

== Robert Hamill Inquiry Report (2026) ==
On 14 September 2026, the Robert Hamill Inquiry Report was finally published. The report had been completed in 2011, but its release to the public was delayed until legal proceedings regarding ex-RUC reserve officer Robert Cecil Atkinson had concluded. The inquiry ruled there was no collusion between the RUC officers and suspects in Hamill's death at the scene of the attack, however multiple failings in the follow-up investigation were highlighted, such as a tip-off to a suspect to destroy the clothing he was wearing on the night in question.
