= Colin Duffy =

Irish republican (born 1968)

Colin Duffy (born 1968) is an Irish republican, described by the BBC as the most recognisable name and face among dissident republicans in Northern Ireland. He was cleared of murder charges in three court cases involving police and army killings.

== Early life ==
Duffy was born into a Catholic family in the Republican Kilwilke estate in North Lurgan, County Armagh.

== IRA career ==
A committed republican, he joined the Provisional IRA when he was young and became involved with the associated political party, Sinn Féin. On 7 March 1990, he survived an attempt on his life by the Ulster Volunteer Force (UVF). He and two other prominent republicans, Sam Marshall and Tony McCaughey, left Lurgan Royal Ulster Constabulary (RUC) barracks after signing bail. A small quantity of ammunition had previously been found in McCaughey's home. A short distance from the station, two masked UVF gunmen opened fire, wounding Duffy and McCaughey, and murdering Marshall. Marshall's last words before he died were said to have been "We were let out to be set up." The killers were never caught; however a man whose description matched that of former Ulster Defence Regiment member and UVF Mid-Ulster Brigade commander, Robin Jackson, was seen behaving suspiciously in the vicinity of the barracks at a previous bail signing by the three men.

Duffy was jailed in 1995 for the murder of former Ulster Defence Regiment (UDR) soldier John Lyness, but later acquitted after one of the key witnesses, UVF member Lindsay Robb, was arrested in Scotland for gun-running. Rosemary Nelson acted as Duffy's solicitor. Two years later, he was charged with shooting dead two RUC constables in Lurgan town centre, but these charges were also later dropped. The dead RUC men, John Graham and David Johnston, had been on foot patrol when they were gunned down. As before, Nelson defended him. Nelson was later killed by loyalists in 1999.

Duffy has been linked to the republican group Éirígí.

=== 2009 Massereene Barracks shooting court case ===
In March 2009, Duffy was charged with the 2009 Massereene Barracks shooting which killed two British Army soldiers.

On 20 January 2012, Duffy was found not guilty. Duffy's co-accused Brian Shivers from Magherafelt was sentenced to life in prison for the killings. Shivers, a cystic fibrosis sufferer, had been given three to four years to live before the trial. In January 2013, Shivers conviction was overturned by Northern Ireland's highest appeals court.

=== 2012–present ===
On 8 September 2012 Duffy gave the graveside oration at the funeral of a Real IRA member killed in Dublin. Describing the deceased Alan Ryan as "a brave Irish republican and fearless IRA volunteer" who was dedicated to "fighting foreign interference in our country".

On 2 November 2012, Duffy, along with another man, was arrested in connection with the murder of Prison Officer David Black on the M1 motorway between Lurgan and Portadown the previous day. In December 2013, Duffy was additionally charged with being a member of the IRA as well as conspiracy to possess firearms and explosives with intent to endanger life, in connection with an alleged plot to murder PSNI officers. Duffy was released on bail in February 2016.

== Personal life ==
Paul and Damien Duffy, his brothers, and his cousin Shane Duffy were also charged with terrorism offences, but were acquitted. A sister-in-law of Colin Duffy, Mandy Duffy, is on the national executive committee of Saoradh, a republican political party.
