= Billy Wright (loyalist) =

Northern Irish loyalist (1960–1997)

- Wright in 1996
- Born: William Stephen Wright; 7 July 1960; Wolverhampton, Staffordshire, England
- Died: 27 December 1997 (aged 37); Maze Prison, County Down, Northern Ireland
- Cause of death: Laceration of the aorta caused by a gunshot wound
- Resting place: Seagoe Cemetery, Portadown, Northern Ireland
- Other name: "King Rat"
- Known for: Ulster loyalist leader
- Spouse: Thelma Corrigan

William Stephen Wright (7 July 1960 – 27 December 1997), known as King Rat, was a Northern Irish loyalist paramilitary leader who founded the Loyalist Volunteer Force (LVF) during The Troubles. Wright had joined the Ulster Volunteer Force (UVF) in his home town of Portadown around 1975. After spending several years in prison, he became a Protestant fundamentalist preacher. Wright resumed his UVF activities around 1986 and, in the early 1990s, replaced Robin Jackson as commander of that organisation's Mid-Ulster Brigade. According to the Royal Ulster Constabulary (RUC), Wright was involved in the sectarian killings of up to 20 Catholics but was never convicted for any.

In 1994, the UVF and other paramilitary groups called a ceasefire. Wright became a staunch opponent of the Northern Ireland peace process, seeing it as a sell-out to Irish nationalists and republicans. Wright drew media attention during the Drumcree standoffs of 1995 and 1996, when he supported the Protestant Orange Order's demand to march their traditional route through the Catholic district of Portadown.

During the July 1996 Drumcree crisis, Wright's unit carried out several attacks, including a sectarian murder. For breaking the ceasefire, Wright's Portadown unit was stood down by the UVF leadership. He was expelled from the UVF and threatened with assassination unless he immediately left Northern Ireland. Wright ignored these threats and formed the LVF with most of his brigade, assuming the leadership role. The LVF carried out a string of killings of Catholic civilians, while allegedly profiting from extortion and narcotics trafficking.

In January 1997, Wright was arrested for making death threats against a woman, and in March, was convicted and sent to the Maze Prison. While imprisoned, Wright continued to direct the LVF. On 27 December 1997, Wright was assassinated by Irish National Liberation Army (INLA) prisoners with a gun smuggled into the prison. An inquiry into Wright's death concluded that serious failings had been shown in the prison authorities. It has been alleged that Wright was a police informant who received help from the Special Branch.

== Early life ==
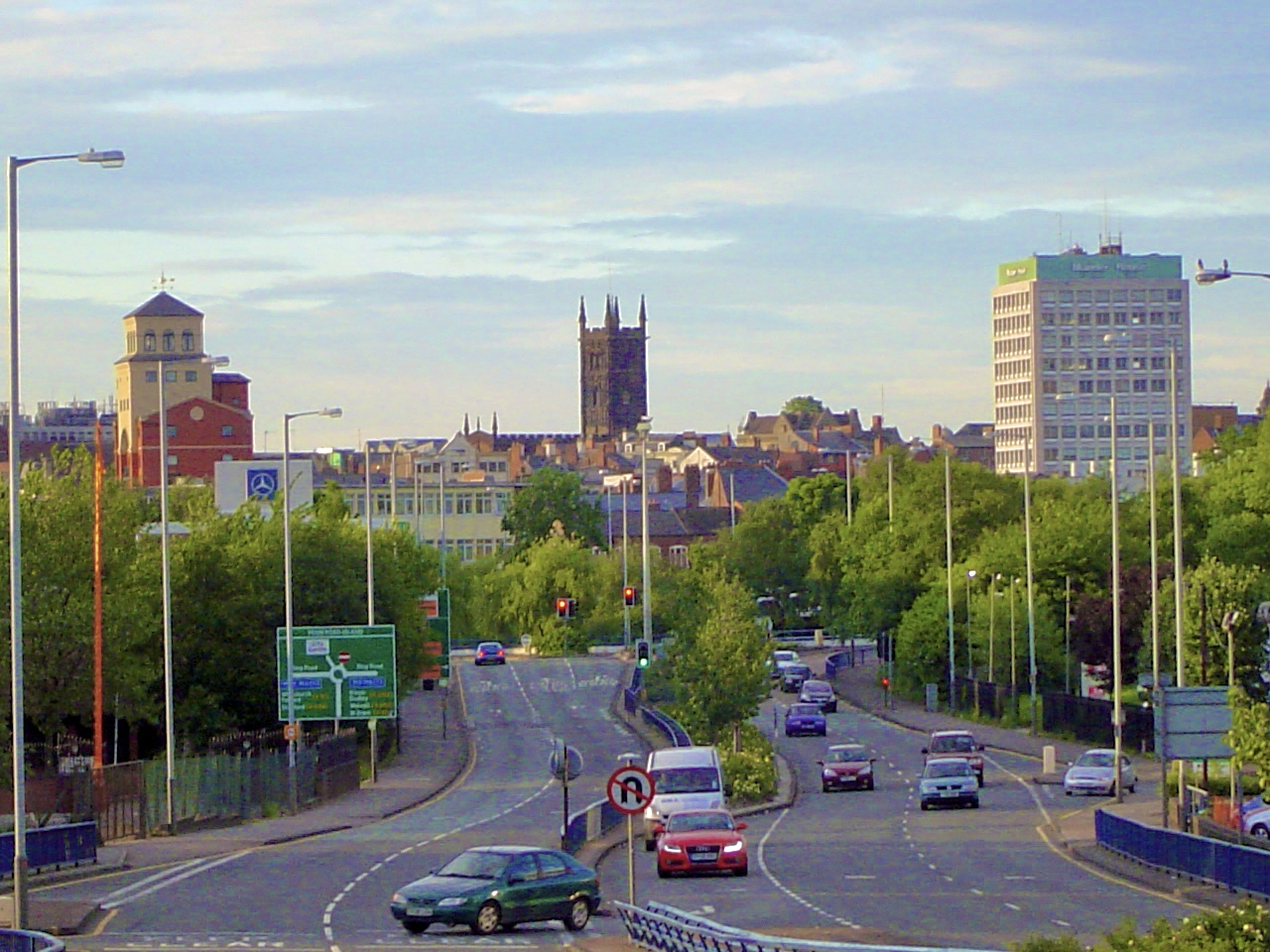
Skyline of Wolverhampton, England, where Wright was born to Northern Irish Protestant parents

William Stephen "Billy" Wright, named after his grandfather, was born in Wolverhampton, England, on 7 July 1960 to David Wright and Sarah McKinley, Ulster Protestants from Portadown, Northern Ireland. He was the only son of five children. Before Wright's birth, his parents had moved to England when they fell out with many of their neighbours after his grandfather had challenged tradition by running as an Independent Unionist candidate and defeated the local Official Unionist MP. The Wright family had a long tradition in Northern Ireland politics; Billy's great-grandfather Robert Wright had once served as a Royal Commissioner. His father found employment in the West Midlands industrial city of Wolverhampton.

In 1964, the family returned to Northern Ireland and Wright soon came under the influence of his maternal uncle Cecil McKinley, a member of the Orange Order. About three years later, Wright's parents separated and his mother decided to leave her children behind when she transferred once more to England. None of the Wright siblings would ever see their mother again. In 1966, Wright and his four sisters (Elizabeth, Jackie, Angela and Connie) were placed in foster care by the welfare authorities. He was raised separately from his sisters in a children's home in Mountnorris, South Armagh (a predominantly Irish republican area). Wright was brought up in the Presbyterian religion of his mother and attended church twice on Sundays. The young Wright mixed with Catholics and played Gaelic football, indicating an amicable relationship with the local Catholic, nationalist population. His family were not extreme Ulster loyalists. Wright's father, while campaigning for an inquest into his son's death, later described loyalist killings as "abhorrent". Two of Wright's sisters married Catholic men, one having come from County Tipperary and whom Wright liked. Wright's sister Angela maintained that he personally got on well with Catholics, and that he was only anti-Irish republican and anti-IRA. For a while, David Wright cohabitated with Kathleen McVeigh, a Catholic from Garvagh.

Whilst attending Markethill High School, Wright took a part-time job as a farm labourer where he came into contact with several staunchly unionist and loyalist farmers who served with the Royal Ulster Constabulary (RUC) Reserve or the Ulster Defence Regiment (UDR). The conflict known as the Troubles had been raging across Northern Ireland for about five years by this stage, and many young men such as Wright were swept up in the maelstrom of violence as the Provisional IRA ramped up its bombing campaign and sectarian killings of Catholics by loyalists continued to escalate. During this time, Wright's opinions shifted towards loyalism, and he soon got into trouble for writing the initials "UVF" on a wall at a local Catholic primary school. When he refused to clean off the vandalism, Wright was transferred from the area and sent to live with an aunt in Portadown.

== Early years in the UVF ==
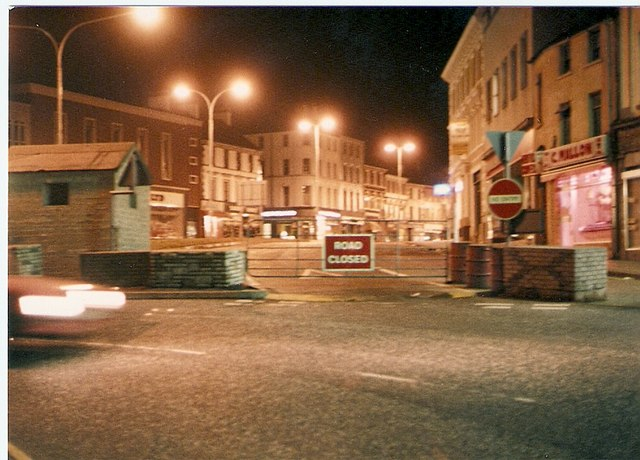
Security barriers in Portadown, County Armagh, in 1982. Wright made his home in Portadown from the time he transferred there as a teenager

In the more strongly loyalist environment of Portadown, nicknamed the "Orange Citadel", Wright was, along with other working-class Protestant teenagers in the area, targeted by the loyalist paramilitary organisation, the Ulster Volunteer Force (UVF) as a potential recruit. On 31 July 1975, coincidentally the night following the Miami Showband killings, Wright was sworn in as a member of the Young Citizen Volunteers (YCV), the UVF's youth wing. The ceremony was conducted by swearing on the Bible placed on a table beneath the Ulster banner. He was then trained in the use of weapons and explosives.

According to author and journalist Martin Dillon, Wright had been inspired by the violent deaths of UVF men Harris Boyle and Wesley Somerville, both of whom were blown up after planting a bomb on board The Miami Showband's minibus. The popular Irish cabaret band had been returning from a performance in Banbridge in the early hours of 31 July 1975 when they were ambushed at Buskhill, County Down by armed men from the UVF's Mid-Ulster Brigade at a bogus military checkpoint. Along with Boyle and Somerville, three band members had died in the attack when the UVF gunmen had opened fire on the group following the premature explosion. Boyle and Somerville had allegedly served as role models for Wright. Boyle was from Portadown. However, in his 2003 book, The Trigger Men, Dillon broke from this version of events and instead concluded that Wright had actually been sworn into the YCV in 1974, when he was 14 years old. Wright's sister Angela told Dillon that her brother's decision to join the UVF had in fact had nothing to do with the Miami Showband killings, and Dillon then concluded that Wright had encouraged this version of events as he felt linking his own UVF membership to the activities of his heroes Boyle and Somerville added an origin myth to his own life as a loyalist killer.

In 1975, shortly after Wright joined the organisation, he was caught in possession of illegal weapons and sentenced to five years in a wing of HMP Maze (Maze Prison) reserved for paramilitary youth offenders. Before his imprisonment, Wright was taken to Castlereagh Holding Centre, a police interrogation centre with a notorious reputation for the brutality employed during grilling. According to Wright's sister Angela, he later claimed that he had been subjected to a number of indignities by the interrogating officers, including having a pencil shoved into his rectum. During his spell in prison, Wright briefly joined the blanket protest, although he stepped down following an order from the UVF's Brigade Staff (Belfast leadership), who feared that prisoner participation in the protest was being interpreted as a show of solidarity with the Provisional IRA. Inside the Maze, he became the wing commander of H Block 2.

Wright later said that his decision to join the YCV had been influenced by the Kingsmill massacre of January 1976, when ten local Protestant civilians were killed by republicans. Wright's cousin Jim Wright, future father-in-law Billy Corrigan, and brother-in-law Leslie Corrigan, were also killed by republicans in this period. Wright later said of the Kingsmill massacre, "I was 15 when those workmen were pulled out of that bus and shot dead. I was a Protestant and I realised that they had been killed simply because they were Protestants. I left Mountnorris, came back to Portadown and immediately joined the youth wing of the UVF. I felt it was my duty to help my people and that is what I have been doing ever since." Locals say he was also "indoctrinated" by local loyalist paramilitaries; however, he had personally come to the conclusion that the UVF was the only organisation that had the "moral right" to defend the Protestant people.

Wright was released from the Maze Prison in 1980. Whilst inside he had nursed a deep resentment against the British state for having imprisoned him for being a loyalist. He was met in the car park by his aunt and girlfriend. In a final act of defiance against the authorities, Wright raised his face up towards a British Army observation tower on the Maze's perimeter fence and shouted "Up the UVF". Following his release, he went to Scotland where he lived for a brief period. He had been there only six weeks when he was taken in for questioning by the Anti-Terrorist Squad based at New Scotland Yard. Although he was not charged with any offences, Wright was nonetheless handed an exclusion order banning him from Great Britain.

Not long after his release from the Maze Prison, Wright was re-arrested, along with a number of UVF operatives in the area on evidence provided by Clifford McKeown, a "supergrass" within the movement. Wright was charged with murder, attempted murder, and the possession of explosives. He was detained in Crumlin Road Prison for ten months. The cases, however, ended without any major convictions after McKeown changed his mind and ceased giving evidence.

== Born-again Christian ==
Wright returned to Portadown and initially tried to avoid paramilitarism. He found a job as an insurance salesman and married his girlfriend Thelma Corrigan, by whom he had two daughters, Sara and Ashleen. He took in his sister Angela's son to be raised alongside his own children when she went to live in the United States. He was regarded as a good father. In 1983, he became a born again Christian and lay preacher in the Free Presbyterian Church and began working as a gospel preacher in County Armagh. He had studied Christianity whilst in prison to pass the time.

As a consequence of his religious conversion, Wright eschewed the highlife favoured by many of his loyalist contemporaries such as Johnny Adair and Stephen McKeag, abstaining from alcohol, tobacco and illegal drugs. He read a lot, including Irish history and theology. In particular, he studied the history of Protestantism in Europe. Wright's religious faith had contradictory influences on his life. On the one hand, he argued that his faith drove him to defend the "Protestant people of Ulster", while at the same time, he conceded that the cold-blooded murder of non-combatant civilians would ensure his damnation. He spoke of this dilemma during an interview with Martin Dillon:

You can't glorify God and seek to glorify Ulster because the challenges which are needed are paramilitary. That's a contradiction to the life God would want you to lead. If you were to get yourself involved in paramilitary activity in its present form, or the form in which it manifested itself during the Troubles, then I don't think you could walk with God... ...There's always the hope that in some way, someday – and there are precedents within scripture – your hope would be that God would draw you back to him. All those who have the knowledge of Christ would seek to walk with him again. People would say, 'Billy Wright, that's impossible,' but nothing's impossible if you have faith in God. I would hope that he would allow me to come back. I'm not walking with God.... Without getting into doctrine, without getting too deep, it is possible to have walked with God and to fall away and still belong to God.

When asked by Dillon whether or not the conflict was a religious war, he replied: "I certainly believe religion is part of the equation. I don't think you can leave religion out of it".

Angela Wright later claimed that her brother had foreseen the September 11 attacks when he told her that as she was living in New York she was abiding in a "city of sin"; he then went on to predict that the World Trade Center towers would be destroyed from the air.

== Mid-Ulster UVF commander ==
In the late 1980s, after a five-year absence from the organisation, Wright resumed his UVF activities. This was in consequence of the November 1985 Anglo-Irish Agreement which angered unionists because it gave the Irish Government an advisory role in Northern Ireland's government. There were frequent raids by the RUC and British Army on his home in Portadown's Corcrain estate. Although he was arrested repeatedly on suspicion of murder and conspiracy, he never faced any charges.

Wright rapidly ascended to a position of prominence within the UVF ranks, eventually assuming leadership of the local Portadown unit. He became commander of the UVF's Mid-Ulster Brigade in the early 1990s, having taken over from his mentor Robin "the Jackal" Jackson, who had been the leader since July 1975 and one of Wright's instructors in the use of weaponry. Jackson was implicated in the 1974 Dublin car bombings, the Miami Showband killings and a series of sectarian attacks. Founded in 1972 by its first commander Billy Hanna, the Mid-Ulster Brigade operated mainly around the Portadown and Lurgan areas. It was a self-contained, semi-autonomous unit which maintained a considerable distance from the Brigade Staff in Belfast. Holding the rank of brigadier, Wright directed up to 20 sectarian killings, according to the Northern Ireland security forces, although he was never convicted in connection with any of them.

Wright is alleged to have ordered or carried out the sectarian murder of 19-year-old Catholic civilian Denis Carville in October 1990. Carville and his girlfriend were sitting in his car at Oxford Island, near Lurgan, when a gunman opened the car door, asked his religion and the name of his priest, then shot him in the head. This was believed to be retaliation for the IRA's killing of an off-duty UDR soldier at the same spot one month earlier.

In March 1991, the Mid-Ulster UVF killed three Catholic civilians in the Craigavon mobile shop shootings. The gunman shot two teenage girls in the head at close range, then forced a male customer to lie on the pavement and shot him also. Loyalist sources later told the Sunday World newspaper the attack had been ordered and planned in Portadown by Billy Wright and Mark Fulton.

A former member of the Mid-Ulster UVF, Laurence Maguire, claimed that Wright and Jackson planned the sectarian murders of Catholic brothers Gerard and Rory Cairns. They were shot dead by two UVF gunmen at their home in Bleary on 28 October 1993.

On 8 May 1994, a UVF gunman fired through the window of a house outside Dungannon, killing 76-year-old Catholic civilian Roseann Mallon and wounding her daughter-in-law. The Mid-Ulster UVF claimed it was targeting her nephew, who had been involved in the republican movement. Within an hour, Wright and two other men were arrested when police stopped their car heading towards Portadown. They were questioned over the killing, but were released without charge four days later. It was alleged that RUC Special Branch colluded with Wright in the shooting, as they had the area under surveillance at the time.

Wright is alleged to have planned an attack on a Catholic-owned taxi depot in Armagh on 18 May 1994. A UVF gunman walked into the depot in broad daylight and opened fire, killing 17-year-old Catholic civilians Shane McArdle and Gavin McShane. Wright had been spotted on the street the day before.

While most of Wright's unit's victims were Catholic civilians, some were republican paramilitaries. On 3 March 1991, the Mid-Ulster UVF shot dead three Provisional IRA men, along with a middle-aged civilian, in an ambush outside Boyle's Bar in Cappagh, County Tyrone. Wright was widely blamed by nationalists and much of the press for having led this attack. According to Paul Larkin in his book A Very British Jihad: collusion, conspiracy and cover-up in Northern Ireland, UVF members at Cappagh claimed they had to drag Wright into the car as he became so frenzied once he started shooting that he did not want to stop. British journalist Peter Taylor, however, stated in his book Loyalists that reliable UVF sources told him Wright was not involved. The RUC arrested Wright after the shootings. During the interrogation, he provided the RUC with an alibi which placed him in Dungannon when the Cappagh attack occurred, and the RUC confirmed this.

Wright considered the ambush in Cappagh to have been a successful UVF operation. The Guardian newspaper quoted him as saying, "I would look back and say that Cappagh was probably our best". The Cappagh attack surprised the Provisional IRA East Tyrone Brigade, as it had been carried out in a village which was an IRA stronghold, a departure from the usual arbitrary killings of Catholic civilians. Wright boasted that he and his Mid-Ulster unit had "put the East Tyrone Brigade of the IRA on the run" and "decimated" them. But according to authors Henry McDonald and Jim Cusack in their book "UVF: The Endgame", the UVF leadership insists Wright was not behind the Cappagh killings, instead it was UVF units from outside Portadown and that the UVF leadership even encouraged the "King Rat" myth for the media to help the heat to be taken off the units who were actually responsible for the attack. Furthermore, they state the Mid-Ulster UVF is not just the Portadown unit, but that it is made up of units from Dungannon, south Londonderry, Armagh City, Cookstown, Lurgan and smaller rural units from mid-Ulster.

The IRA tried to kill Wright on five occasions. On 23 October 1992, they planted a bomb under his car on West Street, Portadown. Wright found the Semtex-based device, which had fallen off, after being told a man was seen crouching beside the car. In June 1994, RUC officers visited Wright to warn him that someone had been seen tampering with his car. The officers were with him while he searched his car, but found nothing. Wright then sat in the car and started it, which detonated a bomb planted in the engine and set the car on fire. He escaped with minor injuries. The North Armagh Brigade of the IRA claimed responsibility.

As part of the Northern Ireland peace process, the IRA called a ceasefire in July 1994. This was followed by the Combined Loyalist Military Command (CLMC) calling a ceasefire on 13 October 1994. Wright was initially caught up in the euphoria, calling it "the happiest day of my life". However, he became skeptical of the IRA's ceasefire, and soon he publicly disagreed with the UVF leadership calling their ceasefire. Wright "detested what he saw as concessions to [Irish] nationalists enshrined in the tentative peace process, and accused the leaders of unionism and loyalism of betraying the cause". He eventually denounced the peace process as a sell-out.

Journalist Susan McKay, writing in The Guardian, was one of the first to report that Wright at this time ran a lucrative protection racket and was one of the most significant drug dealers in the Portadown area, primarily in ecstasy.

=== King Rat ===
Wright's unit called themselves the "Brat pack". The nickname "King Rat" was first given to Wright by the Mid-Ulster Ulster Defence Association (UDA) commander Robert John Kerr as a form of pub bantering. According to journalist and author Paul Larkin, Kerr sat inside a pub and jokingly bestowed a nickname on each patron as they entered. When Wright walked through the door, Kerr gave him the sobriquet of "King Rat". Sunday World journalists Martin O'Hagan and Jim Campbell picked up on it and satirically named them the "rat pack"; they also used the name "King Rat" to identify Wright. Much to Wright's annoyance, the name became popular with the media. In response, Wright had the newspaper's offices bombed and issued a death threat to O'Hagan and anyone who worked for the paper.

In an interview with Martin Dillon, he blamed the police raids, republican death threats and the "King Rat" nickname as factors which eventually caused the break-up of his marriage. He nevertheless maintained cordial relations with his ex-wife, Thelma, whom he described as a "good Christian".

== Drumcree standoff ==
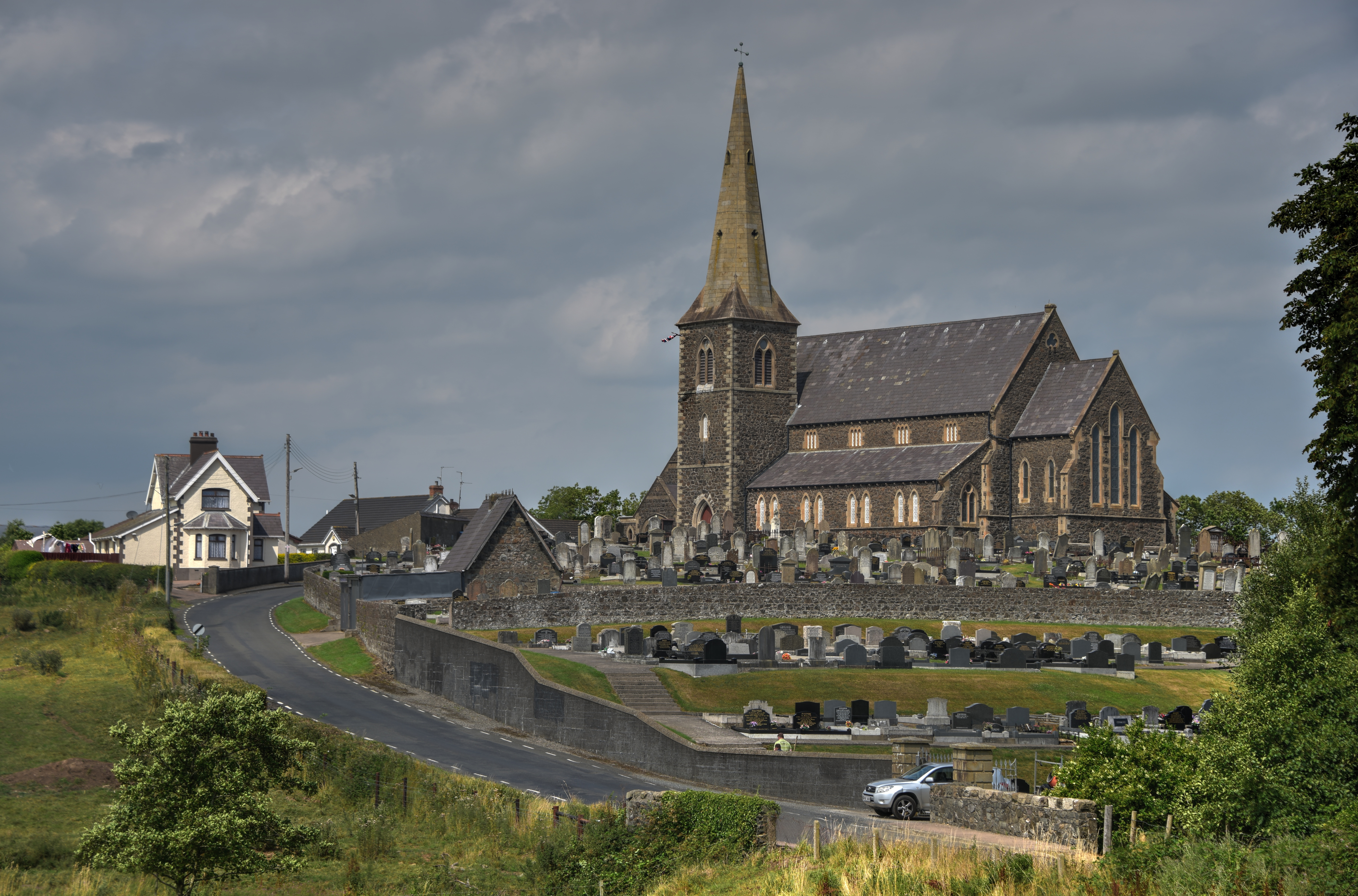
Drumcree Church, Portadown where Wright appeared at the 1996 Drumcree standoff to support the Orange Order's right to march its traditional route through nationalist areas

The Drumcree conflict, stemming from an Orange Order protest at Drumcree Church after their parade had been banned from marching through the predominantly nationalist Catholic Garvaghy area of Portadown, returned to the headlines in 1995 with trouble expected in Wright's Portadown stronghold. Just before the July marching season Irish government representative Fergus Finlay held a meeting with Wright in which the latter pledged his loyalty to the peace process and David Ervine in particular, although Wright also warned Finlay that loyalist views had to be respected. Cracks began to show however as Wright felt that the UVF response to the trouble had been inordinately low-key whilst his taste for the Progressive Unionist Party (PUP) strategy also began to wane as the party moved increasingly towards a form of socialism, an ideology repugnant to Wright. A further problem arose when Wright, who by that time was a popular loyalist figure across Northern Ireland, travelled to the Shankill Road in Belfast in late 1995 to try to overturn a ban preventing an Orange Order parade entering a neighbouring Catholic area. Wright had hoped to bring local UVF units onto the streets of the Shankill to force an overturning of the ban but the Shankill commanders refused to put their units at Wright's disposal, having assured the British authorities that they would not in a series of secret negotiations. Wright returned to Portadown in disgust, accusing the Belfast UVF of having surrendered. Nonetheless, when Wright was arrested in late 1995 for intimidation he was still on good terms with the UVF, whose magazine Combat called for his release.

In January 1996, Wright once again travelled to Belfast where he dropped a verbal bombshell by announcing that the Mid-Ulster Brigade would no longer operate under the authority of the Brigade Staff. That same year Wright was ordered to attend a meeting called by the Brigade Staff at "the Eagle", their headquarters above a chip shop (bearing the same name) on the Shankill Road, to answer charges of alleged drug dealing and being a police informer. The latter accusation came about after the loss of a substantial amount of weapons from the Mid-Ulster Brigade and a large number of its members had been arrested. Wright refused to attend and continued to flout Brigade Staff authority.

Following the decision by RUC Chief Constable Hugh Annesley to ban the Orange parade through the Garvaghy Road area of Portadown in the summer of 1996, a protest campaign of road blockages and general disruption was organised across Northern Ireland by the Ulster Unionist Party (UUP) and the Democratic Unionist Party (DUP). The protests, which led to a reversal of the ban, saw no official UVF involvement although Wright, despite not being a member of the Orange Order, was personally involved and led a sizeable force of his men to Drumcree. Wright and the Mid-Ulster Brigade attracted considerable attention from the global media as they made a show of strength and defended the Orangemen's right to march their traditional route. The brigade manned the barricades, and brought homemade weapons to the church; among these was a mechanical digger and a petrol tanker. There was intelligence that Wright and his unit had planned to attack the British Army and police who were blocking the Orangemen's passage. Television cameras broadcast Wright directing rioters on Drumcree hill against the security forces. Wright even held a meeting with one of the central figures in the operation, UUP leader David Trimble, and he was often seen in the company of Harold Gracey, Grand Master of the Portadown District Orange Lodge. Gracey had thanked Wright and his men for their actions in support of the Orangemen the year before.

Wright stood around 6 feet (1.8 m), had close-cropped blond hair and cold, pale blue eyes. Peter Taylor had been at Drumcree that July and got a close-up view of Wright. Taylor described Wright as a "charismatic leader". Clad in neat jeans, white T-shirt and wearing a single gold earring, he displayed a muscular build. Flanked by two bodyguards, Wright's sudden appearance at Drumcree had inspired much admiration from the young boys and girls who were present. Journalist David McKittrick in the Belfast Telegraph described Wright as having been heavily tattooed, who walked with a "characteristic strut that radiated restrained menace"; and had a "bullet head, close-cropped with small ears and deep-set, piercing eyes". Martin Dillon, who had interviewed him in his home in Portadown, admitted that he had been pleasant and charming throughout the interview, yet throughout the encounter Dillon had "sensed a dark side to his character". Wright was also considered to have been a "political thinker and capable strategist".

As a result of the Belfast leadership's inaction, Wright ordered several killings on his own initiative. On 9 July 1996, at the height of the Drumcree standoff, the dead body of Catholic taxi driver, Michael McGoldrick, was found in his cab in a remote lane at Aghagallon, near Lurgan. He had picked up a fare the night before and had been shot five times in the head. Both the UVF and the UDA released statements denying involvement in McGoldrick's killing. Security sources and loyalist sources say the killing was ordered by Wright as a warning against blocking the Drumcree march. According to PUP leader David Ervine, Wright had ordered the killing for the purpose of incriminating the UVF Brigade Staff by making it appear as if they had sanctioned it. To further Wright's ploy, a handgun had been sent down to the Mid-Ulster Brigade from the Shankill UVF arms dump, but as the weapon had no forensic history the plot backfired. Several years later, Clifford McKeown, the former supergrass, was convicted of the murder of McGoldrick. McKeown, who had claimed that the killing was a birthday present for Wright, was sentenced to 24 years imprisonment for his involvement in the murder.

According to McKeown, Wright and his men had originally planned to kidnap three Catholic priests from a parochial house and kill them if the Orange march was banned from Garvaghy Road.

== Leader of the Loyalist Volunteer Force ==
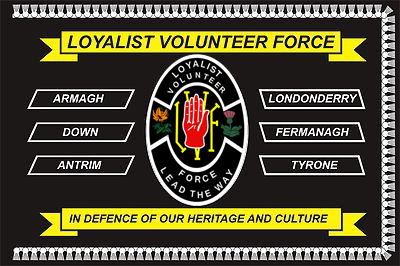
Flag of the LVF

Wright, along with the Portadown unit of the Mid-Ulster Brigade, was stood down on 2 August 1996 by the UVF's Brigade Staff for the unauthorised attack on McGoldrick, insubordination, and undermining the peace process. Wright was expelled from the UVF and also threatened with execution by the Combined Loyalist Military Command if he did not leave Northern Ireland.

Wright expressed the following sentiments regarding the CLMC death threat in an interview with journalist Emer Woodful in late August 1996:

My heart goes out to my family at a time like this. Well, if you think you're right, then you're right. Although I have done nothing wrong except express an opinion that's the prevalent opinion of the people of Northern Ireland and I will always do that, dear, no matter what the price. Well, I've been prepared to die for long many a year. I don't wish to die, but at the end of the day no one will force their opinions down my throat – no one.

Other units of the Mid-Ulster Brigade soon affirmed their loyalty to the leadership. Wright ignored an order to leave Northern Ireland by 1 September 1996, and hours before the deadline attended a Royal Black Preceptory march and a celebration at a club in Portadown's Corcrain estate, receiving a hero's welcome at both events. The security services reported that every lodge and band participating stopped near Billy Wright so that members could shake his hand. On 4 September, at least 5,000 loyalists attended a rally in Portadown in support of Wright. The rally was addressed by Reverend William McCrea (a DUP Member of Parliament) and Harold Gracey (head of the Portadown Orange Lodge). McCrea made a speech critical of David Ervine and Billy Hutchinson for what he felt was their involvement in the death threats. McCrea's sharing of the stage with a militant such as Wright caused uproar, although he argued that he was merely supporting Wright's entitlement to freedom of speech.

Ignoring the threat, Wright, in a public show of defiance, formed the Loyalist Volunteer Force (LVF), taking members mainly from the officially-disbanded Portadown unit of the UVF Mid-Ulster Brigade. According to writers John Robert Gold and George Revill, Wright's "mythical stature" amongst loyalists "provided him with the status necessary to form the LVF" in the traditional UVF stronghold of Portadown. Appearing at a Drumcree protest rally, Wright made the following statement: "I will not be leaving Ulster, I will not change my mind about what I believe is happening in Ulster. But all I would like to say is that it has broken my heart to think that fellow loyalists would turn their guns on me, and I have to ask them, 'For whom are you doing it?'". Wright's hardline stance won the support of a number of leading loyalists, including UVF colleague Jackie Mahood, Frankie Curry of the Red Hand Commandos and Alex Kerr of the UDA. Kerr, another key figure at the Drumcree standoff, had also been ordered by the Combined Loyalist Military Command to leave Northern Ireland on pain of execution.

They were joined by other loyalists disaffected by the peace process, giving them a maximum strength estimated at around 250 activists. They operated outside the Combined Loyalist Military Command and ignored the ceasefire order of October 1994. Wright denounced the UVF leadership as "communists", for the left wing inclinations of some of their public statements about reconciliation with nationalists. Wright was strongly anti-communist and his belief in this was increased by a series of meetings he held with representatives of far right Christian groups from the southern states of the US. From these meetings, organised by Pastor Kenny McClinton, Wright was introduced to conspiracy theories about the role of communists in bringing down Christian morality, ideas that appealed to him. In a somewhat similar vein, Wright also enjoyed close relations with a Bolton-based cell of activists belonging to the neo-Nazi organisation Combat 18 and had members of this group staying in Portadown during the build-up to the Drumcree stand-off in 1997. The UVF in its turn, regarded Wright setting up a rival loyalist organisation in the Mid-Ulster area as "treason". Members of the Belfast UVF often contemptuously referred to Wright as "Billy Wrong", with one UVF leader suggesting that Wright was motivated by "religious zealotry and blind bigotry". The LVF was proscribed by Secretary of State for Northern Ireland Mo Mowlam in June 1997.

Wright personally devised the LVF's codename of "Covenant" which was used to claim its attacks. The LVF published a document stating their aims and objectives

The use of the Ulster conflict as a crucible for far-reaching, fundamental and decisive change in the United Kingdom constitution. To restore Ulster's right to self-determination. To end Irish nationalist aggression against Ulster in whatever form. To end all forms of Irish interference in Ulster's internal affairs. To thwart the creation and/or implementation of any All-Ireland/All-Island political super-structure regardless of the powers vested in such institutions. To defeat the campaign of de-Britishization and Gaelicisation of Ulster's daily life.

=== Imprisonment ===
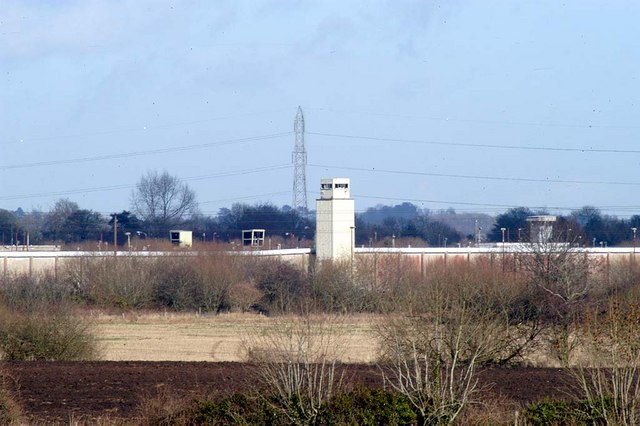
Maze Prison, outside Lisburn, where Wright was sent in April 1997, and shot dead the following December

Despite a series of sectarian murders and attacks on Catholic property by the LVF from 1996 to early 1997 (although they were not claimed by the organisation), Wright was not arrested until January 1997. He was charged with committing an act with intent to pervert the course of justice, and making death threats against a woman, Gwen Reed. This threat followed a punishment beating on her daughter's boyfriend by LVF members. On 7 March, he was sentenced to eight years imprisonment for both offences and initially imprisoned at HMP Maghaberry. On 18 March, he was visited by DUP politician Peter Robinson (who later became First Minister of Northern Ireland in 2008). During the meeting, Wright told Robinson he believed an attempt on his life by republicans was imminent.

He was sent to the Maze in April 1997. He demanded and was granted an LVF section in C and D wings of H-block 6 (H6) for himself and 26 fellow inmates. INLA prisoners were housed in the A and B wings, and the Irish Republican Socialist Party (IRSP, the political wing of the INLA) warned there would be trouble if the prisoners were not kept segregated. In August 1997, LVF prisoners, led by Wright, rioted over their visiting accommodation in the Maze.

Wright continued to direct LVF operations from the prison, although his deputy, Mark "Swinger" Fulton, served as its nominal leader. LVF membership increased during Wright's imprisonment; by October 1997, membership in the organisation was between 150 and 200, many of them former UVF members disillusioned with the ceasefire. It was afterwards discovered that he had kept an irregular diary whilst in prison. On some of the pages, he had made subtle threats to Catholic human rights solicitor Rosemary Nelson (killed in 1999 by a Red Hand Defenders car bomb) and her client, IRA prisoner Colin Duffy, charged with killing two RUC constables (the charges against Duffy were later dropped). Wright's appeal was scheduled to be heard in February 1998.

== Assassination ==
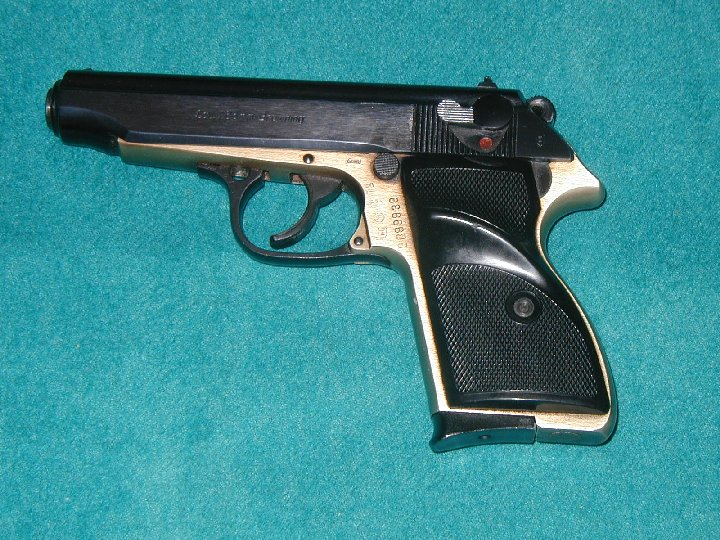
A Hungarian FEG PA-63 pistol like the one used to kill Wright

A tense situation existed within the Maze Prison. INLA inmates had told staff "they intend given a chance to take out the LVF". The Prison Officers Association said precautions had been put in place to ensure inmates from the two groups did not come into contact with each other. Prison officers, however, had grave concerns over security measures in H Block 6, where Wright and the LVF were housed. The situation was made more volatile because, unlike the IRA, the UVF, and the UDA, neither the LVF nor the INLA were on ceasefire.

The decision to kill Wright inside the Maze was made in mid-December 1997 at an INLA Ard Chomhairle which was attended by the INLA Chief of Staff. The assassination was to be carried out in retaliation for the LVF killing of Catholic civilian Gerry Devlin, which had taken place shortly before. On 16 December, a senior INLA member who had been at the Ard Chomhairle went to the Maze to pay a visit to the Officer Commanding of the INLA at H Block 6.

On the morning of Saturday 27 December 1997, just before 10.00 a.m., Wright was assassinated by INLA prisoners inside the Maze Prison. The operation was undertaken by three INLA volunteers – Christopher "Crip" McWilliams, John "Sonny" Glennon and John Kennaway – armed with two smuggled pistols, a PA63 semi-automatic and a .22 Derringer. Wright was shot in the forecourt outside H Block 6 as he sat in the back of a prison van (alongside another LVF prisoner, Norman Green and one prison officer acting as escort) on his way to the visitor's complex where he had an arranged visit with his girlfriend, Eleanor Reilly. John Glennon had been pretending to paint a mural in the sterile area between A and B wings which placed him in a position to see and hear what happened in the forecourt. Upon hearing the announcement over the prison Tannoy system that Wright and Green had been called for their respective visits, Glennon gave a pre-arranged signal to his two waiting accomplices. They moved into position at the A wing turnstile; Glennon ran into the canteen and he mounted a table situated beneath a window which gave him a clearer view of the block forecourt. When he saw Wright entering the van at 9.59 a.m. he gave a second pre-arranged signal, which was: "Go, go, go".

The three INLA men rushed through the turnstile leading to A wing's exercise yard. Peeling away a pre-cut section of wire fence, they climbed onto the roof of A wing and dropped into the forecourt where the Renault van containing Wright had just started to move forward towards the exit gates. The van was ordered to stop by the armed INLA men who jumped in front of the car, however, the driver, John Park, thinking that he and the other officer were about to be taken hostage, intended to accelerate through the partially opened gates in a bid to escape. He was prevented from doing so when the gates were shut by a prison guard believing it to be an escape attempt. The other prison officers stationed at the forecourt gates had spotted the men on the roof, and assuming there was a prison escape in progress, activated the alarm system. The van was ten feet away from the gates when it came to a halt. Neither of the two prison officers inside the van were armed.

While an unarmed Kennaway physically restrained the driver, Glennon, armed with the Derringer, gave cover beside the van as McWilliams opened the side door on the left at the rear, and shouted the words: "Armed INLA volunteers". With a smile on his face, he then took up a firing stance and aimed his PA63 pistol inside the van at Wright, who was sitting sideways facing the side door beside Norman Green, with Prison Officer Stephen Sterritt seated behind the driver, running to a corner. Wright had been in the middle of a conversation, discussing the "cost of Christmas", with both men. After McWilliams ordered Sterritt to "fuck up and sit in his seat" and Green to get out of the way, the two men instantly dropped to the floor to protect themselves; however, Wright stood up and kicked out at his assailant who began firing at point blank range. Green pleaded with Wright to "get down", but McWilliams climbed into the van and continued shooting at Wright, hitting him a total of seven times. Wright, despite being shot, continued to defend himself by moving forward, kicking and lashing out at McWilliams.

Wright was fatally wounded by the last shot, the bullet having lacerated his aorta. He slumped against the legs of Green. After screaming "they shot Billy", Green made an attempt to resuscitate Wright, but to no avail; he was taken to the prison hospital, where a doctor pronounced him dead at 10.53 a.m. None of the others inside the van were hurt as of INLA leadership's orders. Immediately following the shooting attack, the three gunmen returned the way they had come and on arrival in A Wing, negotiations ensued between the volunteers and prison staff, assisted by the prison chaplain. The three men then proceeded to hand over all equipment and materials used in the operation. The three volunteers were then arrested at the prison reception. Upon being charged, Volunteer McWilliams issued a short statement which had been agreed beforehand with the leadership of the INLA if and when the operation against Wright proved successful. This brief statement read:

Billy Wright was executed for one reason and one reason only, and that was for directing and waging his campaign of terror against the nationalist people from his prison cell in Long Kesh [Maze].

=== Aftermath ===
Billy Wright is shown lying in an open coffin flanked by masked and armed LVF members

That night, LVF gunmen opened fire on a disco frequented by Catholic teenagers in Dungannon. Four civilians were wounded and one, a former Provisional IRA member, was killed. Police believed that the disco itself was the intended target.

Four masked and armed LVF men maintained a vigil beside Wright's body which was displayed in an open coffin prior to his paramilitary funeral which took place in Portadown on 30 December. The LVF ordered all shops in the town to shut as a mark of respect; bus and taxi services were also suspended, and the Union Jack flew at half-mast. The media was kept at a distance. After a private service inside Wright's Brownstown home, the funeral cortège, led by a lone bagpiper, proceeded to Seagoe Cemetery, 2 miles (3.2 km) away. Thousands of mourners were in attendance as the hearse containing Wright's coffin moved through the crowded streets, flanked by a guard of honour and preceded by women bearing floral wreaths. The Reverend John Gray of the Free Presbyterian Church officiated at the graveside service. Wright's friend, the former UDA member Pastor Kenny McClinton, also delivered an oration in which he eulogised Wright as having been "complicated, articulate, and sophisticated". LVF gunmen fired a volley of shots over his flag-draped coffin.

Wright's close friend and deputy, Mark "Swinger" Fulton assumed control of the LVF leadership after Wright's death. The LVF became more closely tied to the Ulster Freedom Fighters (UFF) organisation that was led by Johnny 'Mad Dog' Adair. The LVF committed a series of attacks on Catholic civilians, which it termed a "measured military response" in response to Billy Wright's death. Other loyalist paramilitary groups also sought to avenge his killing. On 19 January 1998, the UDA's South Belfast Brigade shot dead Catholic taxi driver Larry Brennan outside his company offices in the Lower Ormeau Road. Martin O'Hagan, the Sunday World journalist whom Wright especially disliked, was killed in September 2001 by the Red Hand Defenders, a cover-name used by the UDA and LVF.

On 20 October 1998, Christopher McWilliams, John Glennon, and John Kennaway were convicted of murdering Billy Wright, possession of a firearm and ammunition with intent to endanger life. The three men had pleaded not guilty. Although they were sentenced to life imprisonment, they only served two years of their sentence due to the early release provisions of the Good Friday Agreement.

=== Inquiry and allegations ===
The nature of Wright's killing, within a high security prison, has led to speculation that the authorities colluded with the INLA to have him killed as he was a danger to the emerging peace process. Four days before his death, Wright himself believed that he would shortly be killed within the Maze Prison by agents of the British and Irish governments in collusion with loyalist informers and the INLA. The INLA strongly denied these rumours, and published a detailed account of the assassination in the March/April 1999 issue of The Starry Plough newspaper. Wright's father, David, had campaigned for a public inquiry into his son's murder and had appealed for help to the Northern Ireland, British and Irish authorities for help in the matter. The murder was investigated by the Cory Collusion Inquiry and it was recommended that the UK Government launch an inquiry into the circumstances of Wright's death. The Cory Inquiry concluded that "whatever criticism might properly be made regarding the reprehensible life and crimes of Billy Wright, it is apparent that he met his death bravely", and described his killing as "brutal and cowardly".

June 2005 saw the Billy Wright inquiry open, chaired by Lord MacLean. Also sitting on the inquiry were academic professor Andrew Coyle from the University of London and the former Anglican Bishop of Hereford, the Right Reverend John Oliver. On 14 September 2010, the findings of the panel were released publicly at Stormont House in Belfast and found that there was no evidence of collusion between the authorities and the INLA. The inquiry, which had cost £30 million, did find a number of failings within the security of the prison. There was the main question of how the weapons were smuggled inside the prison to the killers. There was also the issue regarding the decision to house the INLA and LVF in H Block 6, when it was known that they were deadly rivals, neither of which was on ceasefire, and the INLA had vowed to kill Wright given the opportunity. McWilliams and Kennaway had been transferred to the Maze from Maghaberry the previous May. One month before their transfer, when Wright had still been at Maghaberry, they had organised an unsuccessful hostage-taking incident at the prison. This was meant to end in the assassination of Wright; he was subsequently moved to the Maze.

Other questions were raised after the discovery that on the morning of the killing, Prison Officer Raymond Hill was stood down from his post in the watchtower overlooking A and B wings of H-Block 6 where the INLA prisoners were housed. The CCTV camera placed in the area was also found to have been nonfunctioning for several days prior to the shooting. The visitors lists for 27 December 1997 had been circulated in both the LVF and INLA wings the day before thereby giving Wright's assassins time to prepare for the killing as the list clearly stated that Wright was scheduled to receive a visit on 27 December. The LVF prison van had been parked outside the INLA wing that morning instead of following the normal procedure which was to park outside the LVF wing. And the gates leading from the forecourt were automatically locked as soon as the killers were spotted on the roof. This had prevented the van from driving off and thus effectively trapped Wright in the rear.

In an interview with The Guardian before his own death, one of the killers, John Kennaway said the security inside the Maze was "a joke". He claimed the weapons had been smuggled to McWilliams and Glennon inside nappies. He added that as soon as the "screws" [prison officers] had seen the INLA men on A wing's roof, they assumed the men were staging an escape and sounded the alarm system. The gates were automatically locked-down therefore preventing the van from leaving. Kennaway suggested that had the prison officers not seen them and quickly sounded the alarm, the van could have driven away in time and Wright might have escaped with his life.

Shortly before the findings of the inquiry into Wright's death were released in September 2010, Ulster Television News broadcast a report regarding the question of collusion. South Belfast UDA brigadier Jackie McDonald explained to Ulster Television's Live Tonight the UVF's mindset at the time Wright was threatened with execution by the CLMC in 1996, "It was obvious he [Wright] was doing his own thing and going his own way. I think he had become such an embarrassment to the UVF that they had to send word to him to get out of the country – that's when the LVF was formed, that's when the breakaway group appeared." When asked by the interviewer whether or not the CLMC had actually been prepared to carry out the death threat against Wright McDonald replied, "You have to be prepared to kill people if you tell them to do something and they don't do it – something of that magnitude. If you say they had to go and they don't go – the defiance alone, it doesn't leave many alternatives". McDonald expressed his belief that there had probably been no state collusion in Wright's death. Equally dismissive of the allegations of collusion, Willie Gallagher of the Republican Socialist Movement offered the suggestion that had the INLA not killed Wright, he would have been released from prison shortly afterwards. Once free, Wright would have continued to conduct and orchestrate his murder campaign against nationalists.

On 30 September 2011, Billy's father David Wright died in Portadown at the age of 78. After his funeral service at the Killicomain Baptist Church, he was buried, like Billy, in Seagoe Cemetery. Up until his death, he had continued to profess his belief that there had been state collusion in his son's killing. He denounced the findings of the inquiry released in 2010 as a "total whitewash and a failure to get at the truth".

== Alleged links with RUC Special Branch ==
There are allegations that RUC Special Branch colluded with Billy Wright, providing him with information on suspected IRA members as well as alibis and protection. Before his assassination in 2001, journalist Martin O'Hagan revealed to fellow journalist Paul Larkin that a high-ranking RUC officer had told him Wright received help from RUC Special Branch, and bore the code name "Bertie". Some in the UVF also suspected that Wright was a police informer. An IRA Intelligence officer told Larkin that Wright was selected and trained by Special Branch to take over from Robin Jackson, also an alleged Special Branch agent.

A former member of the UVF Mid-Ulster Brigade, Laurence Maguire, claimed that police gave Wright information on targets, and that he was nearby in a car when some meetings with police took place "up alleyways". Maguire further claimed that the UVF believed that Wright was a "state agent". Two senior security sources also told a BBC Spotlight team that Wright was working for the police.

== Loyalist icon ==
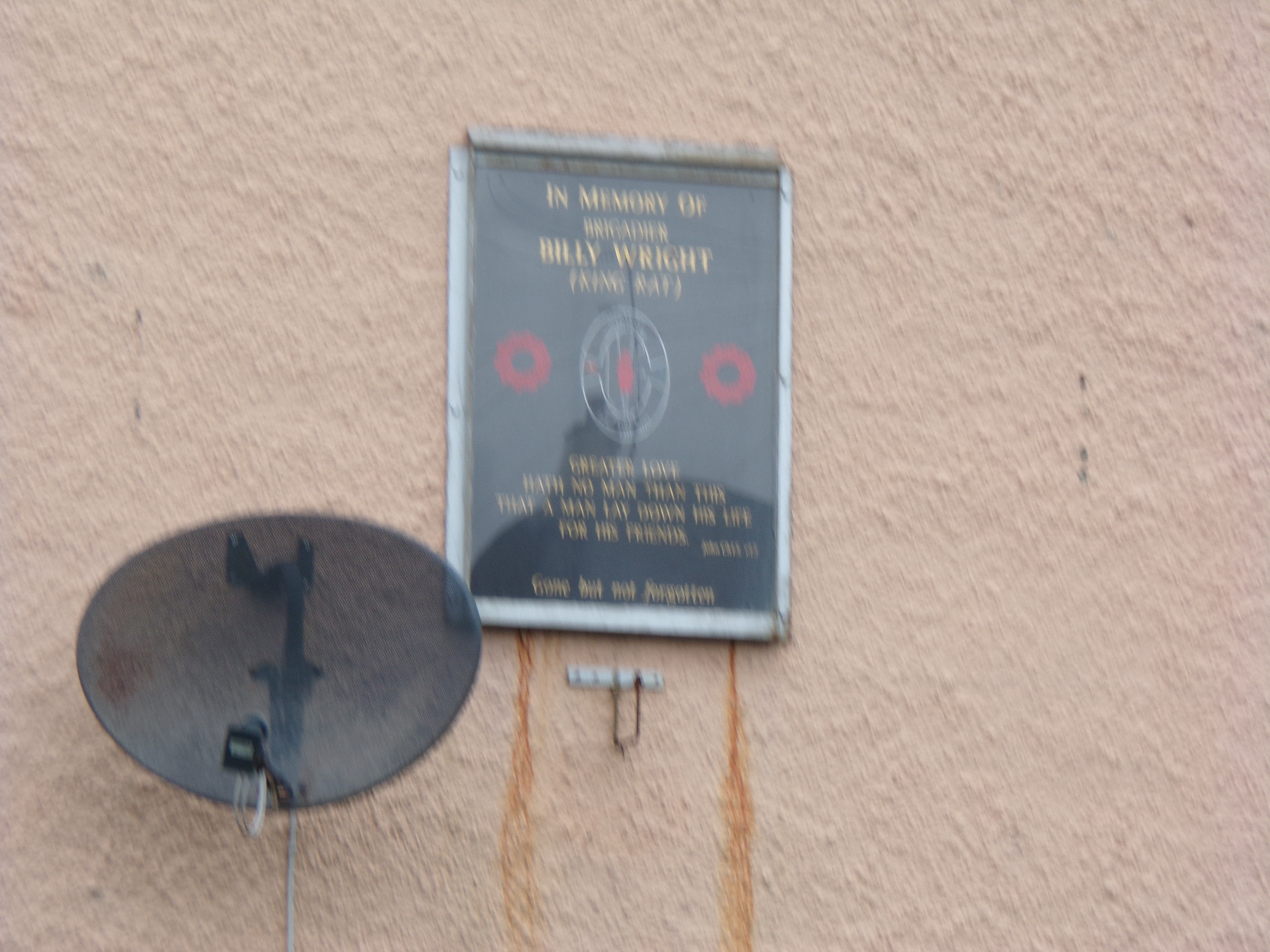
A memorial to Wright in Eastvale Avenue, Dungannon

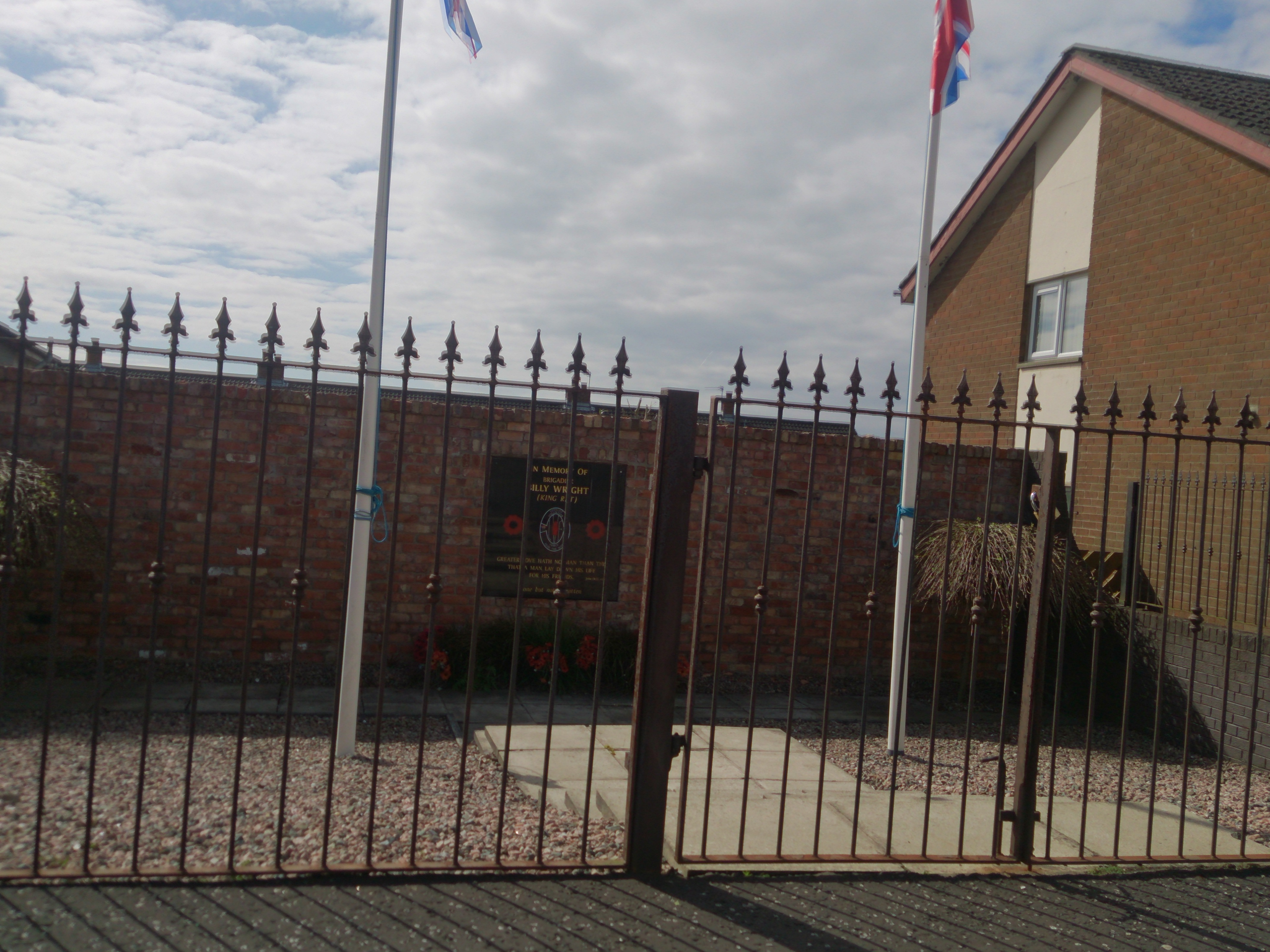
A memorial garden honouring Wright in Ballycraigy, Antrim

For years after his death, Wright's image adorned murals in housing estates in Portadown and elsewhere throughout Northern Ireland. However, one of the most well-known of these, that on a wall near Portadown F.C.'s Shamrock Park home ground, was removed in 2006 with a mural of George Best painted in its stead. Wright is regarded as a martyr and hero by hardline loyalists; many of whom have tattoos bearing his likeness. His successor Mark "Swinger" Fulton had one tattooed over his heart. Most of these tattoos were created by a Bolton-based member of Combat 18, who tattooed many LVF supporters with Wright's image at houses in Portadown's loyalist estates whilst visiting for the Twelfth.

One teenage girl in North Belfast set up a shrine to Wright in her bedroom complete with his photographs. She explained to a journalist, "I'm not interested in pop stars. Billy was a real Loyalist hero and I like to go to sleep at night looking at him". Gunmen at a paramilitary display in Portadown in 2000 told journalists: "He [Wright] did what he had to do to ensure that our faith and culture were kept intact." In the immediate aftermath of Wright's killing, Adair told his main gunmen Stephen McKeag and Gary Smyth that they had a free hand to "avenge" Wright's death, with McKeag almost immediately launching a machine gun attack on a bar in a mainly Catholic area despite the UDA being officially on ceasefire. In a leaflet circulated to foment a feud between the UDA and the UVF, the West Belfast UDA later referenced Wright as a true loyalist who had been a victim of the UVF. Despite this, the two men had had a fractured relationship during Wright's life and according to Adair's sometime girlfriend Jackie "Legs" Robinson, Adair had told her that Wright was a "bastard". Robinson wrote the incident off as jealousy on Adair's part as Wright was already well-established as a leading figure in loyalism by that stage whilst Adair was still making his name.

The Belfast Telegraph newspaper summed up Wright as having been "one of the most fear-inspiring loyalist paramilitaries in Northern Ireland since the Shankill Butchers in the 1970s". Peter Taylor offered an alternative insight into the reputation of Billy Wright by suggesting that popular myth had laid many killings and atrocities at Wright's door when there was actually little evidence to back them up.

== Bibliography ==
- Anderson, Chris (2002). The Billy Boy: The life and death of LVF leader Billy Wright. Edinburgh: Mainstream Publishing. ISBN 978-1-84018-639-0.
- Cusack, Jim; McDonald, Henry (1997). UVF. Dublin: Poolbeg.
- Dillon, Martin (1999). God and the Gun: The Church and Irish Terrorism. New York: Routledge. ISBN 978-0-415-92363-7.
- Dillon, Martin (2003). The Trigger Men. Edinburgh: Mainstream Publishing.
- Gold, John Robert; Revill, George (2000). Landscape of Defence. Harlow, England: Pearson Educational Limited.
- Larkin, Paul (2004). A Very British Jihad: collusion, conspiracy and cover-up in Northern Ireland. Belfast: Beyond the Pale publications. ISBN 978-1-900960-25-0.
- Lister, David; Jordan, Hugh (2004). Mad Dog: The Rise and Fall of Johnny Adair and C Company. Edinburgh: Mainstream.
- McDonald, Henry; Cusack, Jim (2004). UDA – Inside the Heart of Loyalist Terror. Dublin: Penguin Ireland.
- Taylor, Peter (1999). Loyalists. London: Bloomsbury Publishing Plc. ISBN 978-0-7475-4519-4.

Other offices
Preceded by Robin Jackson	Ulster Volunteer Force Mid-Ulster Brigadier; Early 1990s–1996	Succeeded by Richard Jameson?

Other offices
Preceded by New	Loyalist Volunteer Force Brigadier; 1996–1997	Succeeded by Mark "Swinger" Fulton
