= Killing of Rosemary Nelson =

Northern Irish solicitor (1958–1999)

Rosemary Nelson
- Born: Rosemary Magee; 4 September 1958; Lurgan, Northern Ireland
- Died: 15 March 1999 (aged 40); Lurgan, Northern Ireland
- Occupation: Solicitor
- Known for: Killed by Ulster loyalists in 1999
- Children: 3

Rosemary Nelson (née Magee; 4 September 1958 – 15 March 1999) was an Irish solicitor from Lurgan, County Armagh. She represented clients from the Irish nationalist community in several high-profile cases, including the Garvaghy Road Residents Coalition, the family of Robert Hamill, and Provisional IRA member Colin Duffy. She was killed by a bomb planted under her car by an Ulster loyalist paramilitary group. The assassination was claimed by the Red Hand Defenders, a covername for members of the Loyalist Volunteer Force (LVF). Nelson was posthumously awarded the Train Foundation's Civil Courage Prize, which recognises "extraordinary heroes of conscience".

Allegations that the Royal Ulster Constabulary (RUC) were involved in her killing led to a public inquiry. It found that the RUC's hostility towards her helped to "legitimise her as a target in the eyes of loyalist terrorists", that some police intelligence about her had "leaked", and that the authorities failed to give her proper protection.

== Personal life and career ==
Nelson was married and had three children.

Nelson obtained her law degree at Queen's University Belfast (QUB) School of Law. She worked with other solicitors for a number of years before opening her own practice in Lurgan in 1989. Nelson represented clients in a number of high-profile cases, including Michael Caraher, one of the South Armagh Snipers, and Colin Duffy, a Lurgan-based Republican paramilitary accused of killing two RUC officers just yards from Lurgan RUC Station in 1996. She also represented the Garvaghy Road Residents' Coalition in nearby Portadown in the long-running Drumcree conflict against the Orange Order and Royal Ulster Constabulary (RUC).

In 1997, while approaching police lines in her capacity as legal representative of the Garvaghy Road Residents' Coalition, she was grabbed by an RUC officer and pulled into the middle of the police. Nelson reported to the Committee on the Administration of Justice that one of the officers said "Rosemary you Fenian fucker", spat in her face, and that the police pushed her around to the extent that she had bruises all over her arm, her right shoulder and her legs. The later Rosemary Nelson Inquiry concluded that her account of this incident was honest and truthful.

In 1998, the United Nations Special Rapporteur on the Independence of Judges and Solicitors, Param Cumaraswamy, noted threats from the RUC in his annual report and stated in a television interview that he believed Nelson's life could be in danger. He made recommendations to the British government concerning threats from police against solicitors, which were not acted upon. Later that year, Nelson testified before a committee of the United States Congress investigating human rights in Northern Ireland, confirming that death threats had been made against her and her children.

== Assassination ==
On 15 March 1999, Nelson was killed by a sophisticated bomb attached to the underside of her car. The bomb exploded as she drove away from her home on Castor Bay Road in Lurgan, near a primary school. A loyalist paramilitary group calling itself the Red Hand Defenders – a flag of convenience – claimed responsibility for the murder.

On Garvaghy Road in Portadown, several cars and a bus were burned out by Irish nationalists in reaction to the assassination. This sparked clashes with the RUC. Breandán Mac Cionnaith, spokesman for the Garvaghy Road Residents Association and a friend of Nelson, was struck on the eye by an RUC baton during unrest. He issued a statement saying the British government "bears a heavy responsibility" for her murder, for refusing requests to provide her with protection despite threats against her.

Journalists soon learnt that the murder had been carried out by the Loyalist Volunteer Force, specifically that its commander Mark Fulton had sanctioned it when on compassionate release from prison and that Thomas Ewing was the bombmaker.

=== Inquiry ===
Allegations that the British state security forces were involved in her killing led to a public inquiry. In 2004, the Cory Collusion Inquiry recommended that the UK Government hold an inquiry into the circumstances of Nelson's death. The resulting inquiry into her assassination, chaired by retired judge Sir Michael Morland, opened at the Craigavon Civic Centre, Craigavon, County Armagh, in April 2005. In September 2006, the British Security Service MI5 announced it would be represented at the inquiry. This move provoked criticism from Nelson's family, who reportedly expressed concerns that MI5 would remove sensitive or classified information.

The results of the inquiry were published on 23 May 2011. The inquiry found no evidence that state security agencies, including the Royal Ulster Constabulary (RUC), had "directly facilitated" her murder, but "could not exclude the possibility" that individual members of those agencies had helped the perpetrators.

The inquiry also found that Nelson had been publicly threatened and assaulted by RUC officers in 1997, and that those officers had made threatening remarks about her to her clients, which became publicly known. It concluded that this helped "legitimise her as a target in the eyes of loyalist terrorists", and that some RUC intelligence about her had "leaked". All this, it said, increased the danger to her life.

== See also ==
- Pat Finucane
- Robert Hamill
- Billy Wright
- Gavin Brett
