= Ranald MacLean, Lord MacLean =

Scottish judge (1938–2026)

Ranald Norman Munro MacLean, Lord MacLean (18 December 1938 – 11 November 2026) was a Scottish judge.

== Early life and career ==
Born on 18 December 1938, MacLean was educated at Fettes College in Edinburgh, where he was Head of School. He graduated BA from Clare College, Cambridge, LLB from the University of Edinburgh and LLM from Yale University.

Admitted to the Faculty of Advocates in 1964, MacLean served as an Advocate Depute from 1972–1975 and was the Home Advocate Depute from 1979–1982. He was appointed Queen's Counsel (QC) in 1977.

MacLean was appointed a Senator of the College of Justice in 1990, serving until 2005. He was a member of various bodies, including the Scottish Legal Aid Board, the Council on Tribunals, the Parole Board for Scotland, the Secretary of State's Criminal Justice Forum and the Stewart Committee on Alternatives to Prosecution. MacLean was Chairman of a committee established by the Secretary of State for Scotland to review the sentencing and treatment of serious sexual and violent offenders including those with personality disorders in 1999. He also chaired the inquiry into the death of loyalist leader Billy Wright in the Maze Prison (see The Billy Wright Inquiry).

He was a member of the Judicial Appointments Board for Scotland, and, with two other judges and five lay members, was responsible for selecting all new Scottish judges and sheriffs.

MacLean was chairman of the governors of Fettes College since 1996, and was chairman of the council of the Cockburn Association from 1988–1996.

== Lockerbie ==
MacLean was one of the judges who presided at the Pan Am Flight 103 bombing trial. Although the conviction of Abdelbaset al-Megrahi at the trial was widely criticised, MacLean believes the verdict was right. "I have no doubt, on the evidence we heard, that the judgments we made and the verdicts we reached were correct", he told The Scotsman newspaper on 31 January 2006.

As for Megrahi's application to the Scottish Criminal Cases Review Commission (SCCRC), MacLean believed that the SCCRC will refer the case back for further appeal: "They can't be working for two years without producing something with which to go to the court", he suggested to The Scotsman. "But it depends upon what the bases are for a fresh appeal, but I wouldn't have a problem with that."

== Death ==
MacLean died on 11 November 2026, aged 87.
