= Killing of Robert Hamill =

Murder of a Northern Irish Catholic civilian by a loyalist mob in 1997

- Robert Hamill
- Date: 27 April 1997
- Location: Portadown, County Armagh, Northern Ireland; 54.4226953241807°N 6.4435453487172785°W
- Cause: Assault
- Deaths: Robert Hamill (aged 25 years)
- Inquiries: Robert Hamill Inquiry (January 2009)
- Convicted: 1. Paul Rodney Marc Hobson; 2. James Michael Robert McKee; 3. Andrea McKee; 4. Robert Cecil Atkinson
- Convictions: 1. Affray; 2. Perverting the course of justice 3. Perverting the course of justice 4. Perverting the course of justice
- Sentence: 1. 4 years imprisonment 2. 6 months imprisonment 3. 6 months imprisonment (suspended); 4. 12 months imprisonment

On 27 April 1997, Robert Hamill, an Irish Catholic man, was beaten to death by a loyalist mob in Portadown, County Armagh, Northern Ireland. Hamill and his friends were attacked on the town's main street. It was alleged that the local Royal Ulster Constabulary (RUC), parked a short distance away, did not intervene to stop the attack. At the time, tension between Ulster loyalists (mainly Protestants) and Irish nationalists (mainly Catholics) was high, largely due to the ongoing Drumcree parade dispute.

== Background ==
Robert Hamill was born in December 1971 and was one of ten children. He lived with his girlfriend and two children. His third child was born 12 weeks after his death.

== Death ==
Hamill and his friends were attacked by a group of loyalists, many of whom had just returned by bus from a night out at the Coach nightclub in Banbridge, while walking home from St. Patrick's dance hall at about 1:30 am on 27 April 1997. After walking along Market Street, they reached the junction with Thomas Street in Portadown, where the attack took place. Hamill and his friend Gregory Girvan were set upon, with their attackers shouting abuse; Hamill was knocked unconscious almost immediately. A witness stated that about 20 people kicked and punched Hamill in the head and body as he lay defenceless on the ground, shouting "kill him, kill the fenian bastard". Girvan's wife and sister, Joanne and Siobhán, called for help from four RUC officers sitting in a Land Rover about 20 feet (6.1 m) away, but the officers did not intervene. The assault lasted about ten minutes, leaving both men unconscious. Shortly before the ambulance arrived, one of the RUC officers got out of the Land Rover and told Garvin to place Hamill in the recovery position.

Hamill never regained consciousness and died of his injuries 11 days later, on 8 May 1997, aged 25. His autopsy recorded the cause of death as "Diffuse Brain Injury associated with Fracture of Skull due to Blows to the Head".

== Initial arrests and police interviews ==
Several men were arrested and questioned by police after Hamill's death, however only one of them was eventually put on trial for his murder.

Dean Forbes was interviewed under caution, without his solicitor present, on 6 May 1997. He admitted being in Portadown town centere with Stacey Bridgett on the night Hamill was attacked, and described watching a fight involving a large group of people, during which Stacey suffered a suspected broken nose, but denied taking part himself. In a subsequent cautioned interview on 10 May 1997, this time with his solicitor present, RUC detectives asserted that officers at the scene had observed him and Bridgett approaching another man in a threatening manner, and that both were warned to leave the area. Detectives also informed Forbes that two witnesses had made statements naming him as one of the men involved in the beating of Hamill and in assaulting another man during the same incident. Forbes denied all accusations.

Stacey Bridgett was interviewed under caution with his solicitor present on 6 May 1997. He admitted being in Portadown with Dean Forbes on the night in question. He described a fight breaking out and being punched in the nose by an unknown assailant, after which he walked away from the incident to let his nose bleed. RUC detectives said that a witness had pointed him out to an officer at the scene as someone who had jumped on Hamill's head, and that he stood out in her memory because he had a bleeding nose at the time. Bridgett denied all accusations.

Allister Hanvey made a statement to the RUC on 7 May 1997, admitting being at the scene in Portadown where Hamill was beaten, however he denied taking part in the attack. A few days later he was interviewed under caution with his solicitor present, where RUC detectives said that two witnesses had given statements identifying him by name and stating that they saw him punching and kicking Hamill while he lay prone on the ground. Hanvey denied all accusations and stated that he did not attack Hamill in any way.

Paul Hobson (a.k.a Marc Hobson) made a statement to the RUC on 9 May 1997, admitting being in Portadown town centre on the night in question with Hanvey, however he denied witnessing, and therefore taking part in, any violent actions. In a cautioned interview with his solicitor on the same day, RUC detectives said that three different witnesses had observed him fighting at the scene. One witness, who named Hobson both by his own name and his nickname of "Muck", alleged that she saw him fighting two separate men. Another witness, a police officer at the scene, described Hobson by his clothing and an accurate physical description, and stated that he saw Hobson kicking Hamill while he was on the ground. A third witness named five people, including Hobson, who he saw kicking and jumping on Hamill while he lay defenceless on the ground. Hobson denied all accusations.

Wayne Lunt was interviewed under caution with his solicitor present on 10 May 1997. He admitted being in Portadown near the scene of the incident and stated that he was briefly detained in the back of a police Land Rover for an identity check, allegedly because he was wearing a Rangers scarf wrapped around his lower face as a disguise. RUC detectives said that they had received a witness statement that the person placed in the back of the Land Rover that night was seen kicking Hamill while he was on the ground, an accusation Lunt denied.

Rory Randolph Arthur Robinson (aka Rory) was interviewed under caution with his solicitor present on 10 May 1997. He admitted being in Portadown near the scene of the incident, where he observed a disturbance involving a large group of people, but denied taking part. RUC detectives said that he was fully involved in the fracas and was struck by a police officer at the scene, who knew him by name, with a baton due to his aggressive behaviour. The following day, during another cautioned interview, detectives said that two witnesses had made statements identifying him by name as one of the men who assaulted Hamill while he was lying on the ground. Robinson denied all accusations.

== Initial criminal charges ==
On 12 May 1997, Hanvey, Lunt, Hobson, Forbes and Bridgett were charged with the murder of Hamill at a special court in Lurgan RUC station and remanded in custody. Robinson was also later charged with murder. Although they later stated that they had no affiliation with any loyalist paramilitary groups, Hanvey, Lunt, Hobson, Forbes, and Bridgett were, at their own request, held on remand in the Ulster Volunteer Force wing of HMP Maze, while Robinson was held on the Loyalist Volunteer Force wing of the same prison. The October 1997 edition of the L.V.F's Leading the Way magazine included a message of support addressed to the "Portadown Six", stating: "We would like to take this opportunity to wish you all success in your trial ... you have been criminalized for defending yourselves against an unprovoked attack ... you have our full support and best wishes and we hope to see you home soon".

On 31 October 1997, charges were dropped against Robinson, Hanvey, and Forbes after the Director of Public Prosecutions withdrew the murder charges on the evidence of certain witnesses. On 19 November 1997, the charges against Lunt and Bridgett were also dropped, with the DPP later stating that the evidence available was insufficient to provide a reasonable prospect of obtaining a conviction for murder against the men.

== Trial of Paul Rodney Marc Hobson ==
Hobson was found not guilty of the murder of Hamill after a crown court trial. He was found guilty of unlawful fighting and causing an affray and sentenced to four years' imprisonment. The case under which Hobson was prosecuted has been described as questionable, as the main witness, Constable Atkinson of the then RUC, was at one stage a suspect in conspiracy to cause murder in the same case. His solicitor also did not use certain evidence to cross‑examine witnesses. Mr Justice McCollum said during his verdict that the killing was a sectarian act, with a very large number of loyalists attacking a small number of nationalists, but that he could not decide whether the RUC men had left their Land Rover during the attack.

== Criticism of police actions ==
Rosemary Nelson was solicitor for the Hamill family (until she was assassinated by a loyalist car bomb in Lurgan) and she began holding the RUC to account within days of the assault on Hamill. The four RUC officers in the land rover at the scene were heavily criticised for not getting out of their vehicle and intervening or taking any other actions (such as calling for back up or firing shots into the air) to try to prevent the prolonged attack on Hamill, with accusations that they did not intervene because a Catholic was being attacked. The RUC was also criticised for initially alleging in press releases that there had been a riot between two large groups, and later alleging that a large group had attacked a group of four.

RUC officer Gordon Cooke was the subject of a subsequent internal investigation where he was accused of neglecting to preserve the crime scene and failing to arrange the prompt arrests of identified suspects (or the seizure of their clothes for forensic examination), which resulted in loss of forensic and identification evidence that led to a number of persons being acquitted at court for offences linked to the death of Hamill. Hamill's sister, Diane, also alleged that the RUC had harassed her in the lead up to the trial of Hobson, citing incidents such as blocking her in a car park with their vehicles and following her on foot while she was out shopping.

== Allegations of police collusion ==
A public inquiry (the Robert Hamill Inquiry) was held on the recommendation of the Cory Collusion Inquiry to investigate allegations that RUC officers at the scene of the attack failed to protect Hamill and later frustrated the investigation into his death. Within days of the attack, the girlfriend of murder suspect Hanvey made a statement to police alleging that her boyfriend had said RUC reserve officer Atkinson phoned his home a few hours after Hamill's assault to advise him to destroy the clothing he was wearing at the time of the incident, and that he was also ringing him daily to give him information on the RUC's investigation. During subsequent interrogations, RUC reserve officer Atkinson gave statements confirming he knew Hanvey through the local Taekwondo club (Hanvey had a black belt) and had seen him in Portadown town centre on the night in question, however he denied having called his house to warn him to dispose of evidence. Atkinson stated that a family friend named James Michael Robert McKee (who managed the local Taekwondo club they both attended) and his wife Andrea had slept over at his house on the night in question, and that it was McKee who rang Hanvey's house to enquire about the wellbeing of Hanvey's girlfriend, who was McKee's niece.

== Subsequent legal proceedings ==
=== McKee's 2002 conviction for perverting the course of justice ===
On 7 May 2002, McKee and his ex-wife Andrea pleaded guilty at Craigavon Crown Court to doing an act with intent to pervert the course of justice in relation to the fatal assault on Hamill. She was sentenced to six months imprisonment suspended for two years, while McKee received a sentence of six months' immediate imprisonment. At the conclusion of their trial it was revealed that after the break up of their marriage, Andrea had contacted police to withdraw earlier statements she had made regarding phone calls from RUC reserve officer Atkinson's house on the morning of 27 April 1997.

She then attended several police interviews where she outlined how Atkinson had asked her husband to make false statements to conceal the fact that Atkinson himself had phoned the house of Hanvey (who was later charged with Hamill's murder), and how she had given untrue statements to police alleging that she and her husband had slept over at Atkinson's house to support that account. Andrea also stated that she would be willing to give evidence at any subsequent criminal proceedings regarding the offence for which she was convicted.

=== Collapse of Atkinson's & Kenneth Hanvey 2010 trial for perverting the course of justice ===
In December 2010, it was announced that three people, including a former RUC officer, were to be charged in relation to Hamill's death. In September 2014, after several delays to legal proceedings, District Judge Peter King, sitting at Craigavon court, ruled that a key witness was entirely unreliable and utterly unconvincing. The case against Atkinson, his wife Eleanor, and Hanvey was therefore ruled not sufficient to try.

=== Atkinson's & Kenneth Hanvey 2023 trial for perverting the course of justice ===
On 13 September 2023, ex-RUC reserve officer Atkinson (one of the officers in the police vehicle on the night Hamill was killed) and his wife Eleanor were charged with conspiring with each other and others to pervert the course of justice on dates between September and 30 October 1997. The charge related to the giving of false information to police officers making enquiries about a telephone call made from Atkinson's house on 27 April 1997 at 8:37 am, regarding the identity of the person who made the call. Atkinson had previously given a statement that McKee was the person who made the call, it had been alleged that Atkinson himself had called the home of Hanvey to advise him to destroy the clothing he was wearing at the time of the incident.

Both Atkinson and his wife entered not guilty pleas at Craigavon Crown Court, and the case was adjourned for mention again in October 2023. Hanvey was also due to be arraigned on a charge of perverting the course of justice on the same day, but his case was adjourned as he could not attend court due to illness. On 10 October 2023, Hanvey entered a not guilty plea at Craigavon Crown Court to a charge of perverting the course of public justice on 25 November 1997, in relation to providing false information to a police officer regarding the identity of a person who called his house on that date. Hanvey was released on bail, with his trial expected to begin in early 2024.

=== Atkinson 2024 conviction for perverting the course of justice ===
On 18 April 2024, Atkinson pleaded guilty at Craigavon Crown Court to conspiring to pervert the course of justice in relation to police investigations into the killing of Hamill in 1997. Atkinson admitted that he conspired with the McKee's and others to pervert the course of public justice by giving false information to police officers regarding the identity of the person who made a telephone call from his house at 8:37 am on the morning of 27 April 1997. Prosecutors then informed Judge Patrick Lynch that they would be offering no further evidence against co-defendants Eleanor or Hanvey, and not guilty verdicts were recorded for both. Judge Lynch instructed the prosecution to clarify the extent of Atkinson’s criminal liability, as although he had admitted making a false statement about the identity of the caller, it was unclear whether he had interfered with the police investigation into the death of Robert Hamill. Atkinson was released on bail, with sentencing scheduled for early June 2024.

On 7 June 2024, at a sentencing hearing in Craigavon Court Court, defence lawyer KC Barry Gibson lodged a plea in mitigation on behalf of Atkinson, stating that due to multiple serious health issues such as strokes, TMIs, and heart attacks, the defendant could not remember the contents of the telephone call he made on 27 April 1997. Prosecutor KC Toby Hedworth stated that, regardless of the authorities being unable to prove exactly what was said during the call, the context was that a police officer who was present during the fatal assault had rung the home of a young man who was also present at the scene and who was likely to be a suspect in any future investigation into the death of Hamill. Judge Lynch remarked that delays in the case reaching trial, coupled with Atkinson's medical issues, might justify the suspension of any prison sentence, and that he would review victim impact statements before making a final decision. Sentencing was adjourned for a week and Atkinson was again released on bail.

On 14 June 2024, Atkinson was sentenced to 12 months' imprisonment for conspiring to pervert the course of justice in relation to police investigations into the killing of Hamill. Judge Lynch told Atkinson that he had been "a disgrace to [his] uniform and have continued to serve as a police officer for years afterwards as a criminal - for there is no other description for you."

== Robert Hamill Inquiry Report (2026) ==
On 14 September 2026, the Robert Hamill Inquiry Report was published. The report had been completed in 2011, but its release was delayed until legal proceedings regarding ex-RUC reserve officer Atkinson had concluded. The inquiry ruled that there was no collusion between the RUC officers and suspects in Hamill's death at the scene of the attack, however multiple failings in the follow-up investigation were highlighted, including a tip-off to a suspect to destroy the clothing he was wearing on the night in question.

== See also ==
- The Troubles in Portadown
- Robert Hamill Inquiry
