= Martin O'Hagan =

Irish investigative journalist (1950–2001)

- Press kit photo of O'Hagan
- Born: Owen Martin O'Hagan; 23 June 1950; Lurgan, County Armagh, Northern Ireland
- Died: 28 September 2001 (aged 51); Lurgan, County Armagh
- Cause of death: Assassination (gunshot wound)
- Other name: Marty
- Education: Open University; Ulster University
- Occupation: Journalist
- Years active: 1978–2001
- Employer: Sunday World
- Organization: National Union of Journalists
- Criminal charges: Firearms offences
- Criminal penalty: 7 years in prison
- Spouse: Marie Dukes
- Children: 3
- Relatives: J. B. O'Hagan (uncle); Dara O'Hagan (cousin)

Owen Martin O'Hagan (23 June 1950 – 28 September 2001) was an Irish investigative journalist from Lurgan, Northern Ireland. After leaving the Official Irish Republican Army (Official IRA) and serving time in prison, he began a 20-year journalism career, during which he reported on The Troubles in Northern Ireland before being murdered, allegedly by Ulster Loyalist paramilitaries in September 2001.

Born in Lurgan to Catholic and republican parents, several members of his family became prominent in paramilitary activities and politics. After returning to Lurgan from West Germany, where his father had worked for the British Army, he left school to work at his family's television repair shop. He soon became involved in both the Official Sinn Féin (which, after renouncing paramilitary activity, evolved into the Workers' Party) and the Marxist-Leninist Official IRA. He was arrested and questioned over various crimes, including the murder of a Royal Ulster Constabulary police officer and a British Army soldier, but was eventually convicted and sentenced only for firearms offences in 1973.

After serving five years in Long Kesh prison, O'Hagan began a journalism career with Fortnight and the Sunday World. He reported on extortion, racketeering, narcotics trafficking, and other organized crimes committed by paramilitaries, like Robin Jackson. O'Hagan also worked with the Channel 4 programme Dispatches on alleged collusion in multiple sectarian murders by security forces and Loyalists (see Glenanne gang). He was abducted in 1989 by members of the Provisional IRA, and often seriously angered the Ulster Volunteer Force's Mid-Ulster Brigade leader Billy Wright by writing exposés about his unit's activities and accusing Wright of being a criminal informant for RUC Special Branch.

After Wright was killed in prison by the INLA in 1997, threats continued to be made against O'Hagan's life by members of the new Loyalist Volunteer Force (LVF), a terrorist organization of dissident Loyalists which Wright had founded to violently resist the Northern Ireland Peace Process. On 28 September 2001, while walking home from a pub with his wife, O'Hagan was shot from a moving car and died at the scene. The prime suspects remain members of the LVF, but no one, to date, has been convicted of committing the crime. Criminal prosecution of five LVF members was attempted in the late 2000s and early 2010s, but the case for the Crown collapsed after one defendant, who had turned supergrass, was ruled to be an unreliable witness. British security forces have repeatedly been accused of hindering prosecution of O'Hagan's murderers. Further accusations of a criminal conspiracy between Royal Ulster Constabulary officers and the LVF in O'Hagan's assassination have also been made by his fellow journalists. O'Hagan was one of only two journalists killed while working during The Troubles, the other being Phillip Geddes who was murdered by the IRA in 1983. He was also the last journalist to be killed in the United Kingdom before the murder of Lyra McKee by the New IRA in 2019.

== Early life and family ==
Owen Martin O'Hagan was born on 23 June 1950 in Lurgan in the north-east of County Armagh, the oldest of six children. Both his parents were from Lurgan, but O'Hagan spent a large period of his childhood in British military bases across West Germany due to his father's career with the British Army. His grandfather had also served in the military, being evacuated from Dunkirk. When O'Hagan was four his family returned to Lurgan, where he attended school and his father ran a television repair shop. Following his O Levels, he left education and began working at his father's shop. His parents soon separated, and his father left for London.

His family had a history of Irish republicanism: his uncle was J. B. O'Hagan, who escaped from Mountjoy Prison in 1973, and his cousin was Sinn Féin politician Dara O'Hagan. The family were Catholic. His brother, Rory O'Hagan, was convicted in the 1970s after an Official Irish Republican Army (Official IRA) shootout with the Gardaí in County Cork.

== Official IRA membership ==
As a teenager, O'Hagan joined the Official Sinn Féin (later the Workers' Party), and made friends with then-general secretary Máirín de Burca, with whom he pelted Richard Nixon's car with eggs during a 1970 visit to Dublin. He was fined £2 for the incident and let go. His mother had insisted he live in the Irish capital for a while to escape the political troubles of Lurgan, but this appears to have backfired.

While his membership of the Official IRA was known publicly, alleged key details remained practically unknown until the publication of a 2002 book entitled Milestones in Murder, by Sunday World reporter Hugh Jordan. The details were summarised in a November 2002 article by Barrie Penrose in The Spectator. Back home from Dublin, O'Hagan had joined the Lurgan unit of the Official IRA, enjoying their socialist-republican policies and military wing. He soon became the "adjutant" of the group. In 1971, a few years after The Troubles began, O'Hagan was one of many republican suspects who was interned at the paramilitary detention centre at Long Kesh (also known as "The Maze").

On 15 December 1972, Police Constable George Chambers and his colleagues were driving through Lurgan's Kilwilkie estate after delivering Christmas presents to the house of an injured child. While there, they noticed a stolen Ford Cortina and suspecting it to be booby-trapped began evacuating the area. O'Hagan and his active service unit were hid in a flat nearby, from which they planned to rob a van later that day. Upon noticing the police, the group left the flat and attacked. The group fired semiautomatic guns towards the police, with Chambers being shot. O'Hagan allegedly then stood over his injured body and fired bullets until he had died. Following this, he shot another in the mouth before running away down an alley.

In May 1973, O'Hagan and his men were arrested on suspicion of the crimes. 19-year-old Gerald Duff admitted his role in the murder and was given a life sentence. The unit's commander, James Shanks, was also jailed. Both named O'Hagan as Chambers' killer in signed statements, and other group members confirmed the matter. While being interrogated O'Hagan remained silent, and was never charged with the murder.

Later that year, he was arrested after a shooting in a Lurgan bar, where a Protestant man named William Houston was shot in the leg by O'Hagan's group. He was released again, but caught by a British Army patrol transporting an Armalite rifle and an M1 carbine across Lurgan. He was charged with the attempted murder of Private Ian Matterson of the Royal Regiment of Fusiliers, but the charge was dropped. However, he was found guilty of firearms offences and was sentenced to another seven years at Long Kesh.

While serving this sentence, he slowly began to turn away from his paramilitary past. He soon began studying sociology with the Open University and later the University of Ulster. He was released from prison in 1978.

== Journalism career ==
After he was released from prison, O'Hagan returned to north Armagh and began reporting on clashes between loyalist and republican paramilitaries. While his journalism career began in the late 1970s, he was involved with local paramilitary activities until the early 1980s, being a suspect in the armed robberies of a Lurgan post office and a shop. In 1982, he was given an unpaid position with the left-wing Irish periodical Fortnight. Then-editor Andy Pollak described him as "full of enthusiasm and hugely committed", stating he had "a courage bordering on recklessness. He'd go and get the stories other people were afraid to touch". He continued writing for Fortnight throughout the 1980s, becoming assistant editor underneath Pollak.

O'Hagan soon began doing freelance work for The Irish Times, and in 1987 he joined the Belfast office of the Irish tabloid Sunday World, managed by Jim Campbell at the time. The paper reported on the sectarian violence of the Troubles, with a specific focus on the crimes of Robin Jackson (known as "The Jackal"), an Ulster Volunteer Force (UVF) leader who had been involved in various brutal killings. In 1984, Campbell was shot by UVF members after revealing information on an assassination.

In the late 1980s, O'Hagan was a key source for the Channel 4 Dispatches documentary The Committee, which aired in 1991. The show concerned the Ulster Loyalist Central Co-ordinating Committee, a group of Loyalists and security force members who allegedly carried out sectarian killings. Both the Royal Ulster Constabulary (RUC) and mainstream paramilitaries denied the existence of the committee. The show led to a series of libel cases and prosecutions, with Channel 4 being fined £75,000 for failing to inform the RUC about allegations within the show. O'Hagan was accused of receiving £5,000 for his part in the programme. In 2000, he appeared at London's High Court during one of the libel cases, where he stated "I have always tried to be squeaky clean because people will always try to cast this up in my face". The programme was later turned into a book by Sean McPhilemy.

=== National Union of Journalists ===
O'Hagan served as joint Belfast secretary of the National Union of Journalists, having a focus on contracts and bullying within the workplace. In 1999, he campaigned for Ed Moloney regarding the handing over of vital information, and gave evidence on behalf of Sean McPhilemy in his libel case against the Sunday Times.

=== IRA abduction ===
Despite his republican background, O'Hagan was abducted in September 1989 by the Provisional Irish Republican Army (IRA) after his name had appeared in the diary of a RUC officer who had been murdered by the IRA earlier that year. He had been invited to south Armagh under the guise of an interview, but was then bound by members of the South Armagh Brigade. While in their possession, he underwent an interrogation with the IRA's Internal Security Unit (known as the "Nutting Squad"), and allegedly spent two nights with a hood placed over his head. He was eventually released after convincing them he was not a police agent. The abduction was covered in Rebel Hearts, a book by O'Hagan's former friend and journalist Kevin Toolis.

=== Later years ===
O'Hagan's investigating continued after his abduction. In 1991, he reported that Margaret Perry, a young woman from Portadown, had been murdered by the IRA and buried in a shallow grave across the border in the Republic of Ireland. Her body was found the next year, but the IRA denied involvement. In the 1990s, he gained the attention of Billy Wright, who had become leader of the UVF Mid-Ulster Brigade before subsequently founding the Loyalist Volunteer Force (LVF). While Wright's group called themselves the "Bratpack", O'Hagan nicknamed them the "Ratpack" and christened Wright "King Rat". He began reporting on the murders, drug deals, and other crimes that happened under his watch.

In 1992, the Belfast offices of the Sunday World were bombed by the UVF; O'Hagan was not present during the bombing, instead having been lured into another trap and beaten up at the Maze. After the bombing, reporter Jim McDowell was called to the UVF headquarters and made to deliver a personal threat to O'Hagan from Wright: "If anything happens to Billy Wright or his family, he will visit the same tenfold on Martin O'Hagan and his family". Due to these threats, O'Hagan was moved by the Sunday World to Dublin in November of that year, and then moved again to County Cork following loyalist death threats made against him. His wife and daughters remained in Lurgan.

O'Hagan continued working for the newspaper, and soon moved back to Lurgan in 1994. While the situation was more peaceful now, threats continued to be made against O'Hagan's life. In the final years of his life, O'Hagan continued reporting on paramilitaries and crime, publishing stories about the actions of neo-Nazi group Combat 18 regarding Lurgan solicitor Rosemary Nelson and the supposed ethnic cleansing of Portadown. He interviewed Christopher "Crip" McWilliams, a member of the Irish National Liberation Army and one of the killers of Billy Wright, which angered loyalists, before separately publishing an article on McWilliams apparently stalking a girl.

While he often engaged in investigative journalism and serious stories, he was largely seen as a tabloid writer, with his colleague Jim McDowell saying "All he wanted was to be a hack". O'Hagan's reporting was often supported by insider information, such as former loyalist activist Barrie Bradbury, whose life was threatened several times by paramilitary groups. Bradbury later claimed to know the identity of O'Hagan's killer and had informed the Sunday Business Post.

== Personal life ==
O'Hagan was married to Marie (née Dukes), a Protestant woman who he met at the Carnegie Inn (better known as "Father Joes" or "Fa' Joes") in Lurgan. As one of the few "mixed" pubs in the town, the Catholic/Protestant couple would visit the pub often, including on the night of his murder. They had three daughters.

While he had earlier republican ties, O'Hagan was later seen as being unsectarian, with Toolis describing O'Hagan's attempts to drink at a loyalist bar on the night preceding The Twelfth. He was an atheist and a Marxist.

== Assassination ==
O'Hagan had expressed concerns that he was being followed by members of the LVF, who he had angered by reporting their crimes. A week prior to his death, he had been intimidated by a familiar loyalist living in Lurgan, who told him "You have been clocked walking down here".

A year prior, O'Hagan had bought a new house at Westfield Gardens, near the loyalist Mourneview estate where his mother-in-law lived.

On 28 September 2001, O'Hagan and his wife Marie went for their weekly drink at The Central Bar, popularly known as Fa' Joe's pub, on Lurgan's Market Street, arriving there at around 8 pm. Two hours later, they began to walk home, taking a different route than their normal one. At 10:30 pm, while walking down Westfield Gardens and near the Mourneview estate, a silver Subaru Impreza parked outside a neighbour's house began to slowly move forwards. A gunman leaned out the driver's window and shot towards the couple. Marie reported that O'Hagan had called out "It's Mackers" as he saw the shooter, suggesting that he knew who his killers were. O'Hagan pushed his wife into their neighbour's hedge, while he took three bullets in the back. Following the impact, he told his wife to phone an ambulance, but he died before she returned from making the call. A silver Ford Orion used by the shooters to escape was later found burned out on the Mourneview estate. Police suggested the Orion may have been left as a decoy.

=== Investigation ===
Police stated that their chief suspects were members of the LVF and associates of Billy Wright. They confirmed the existence of two key suspects, including the "Mackers" whom O'Hagan had recognised. The gun used to kill him had supposedly been used before in a feud murder, brought to Lurgan from Dungannon in County Tyrone, with Susan McKay suggesting the killer was a member of Billy Wright's original Ratpack. The weapon was confirmed to have been used to kill Grahame Marks in April 2001 in Tandragee, another killing attributed to the LVF.

O'Hagan's murder was later claimed by members of the LVF, who often operated as the Red Hand Defenders (RHD). They accused him of committing "crimes against the loyalist people". The RHD name was previously used following the murder of Rosemary Nelson in 1999.

=== Reaction ===
On 29 September 2001, John Reid, then-Secretary of State for Northern Ireland, denounced O'Hagan's death as a "barbaric killing" and vowed to track down his murderers. Hours before O'Hagan's death, Reid had warned the Ulster Defence Association (UDA) over its ceasefire breaches, but had not gone as far as fully condemning them. Martin McGuinness, then-Education Minister for Sinn Féin, called Reid "very foolish" for walking back on actions to declare the ceasefire broken, following O'Hagan's murder. Sir Ronnie Flanagan, Chief Constable of the RUC, said the killing "definitely carries the hallmark of the LVF". Suggestions were made that Mark Fulton, Wright's successor in the LVF, had ordered O'Hagan's murder in retaliation for his investigative journalism accusing the LVF of multiple assassinations and narcotics trafficking.

Bertie Ahern, the then-Taoiseach, called it "senseless and brutal", while Reg Empey, the Acting First Minister of Northern Ireland, denounced O'Hagan's murder as "an attack on democracy itself". Upper Bann MLA and leader of the Ulster Unionist Party David Trimble stated that "[he was] shocked and appalled by this cowardly act, which must be condemned by all right-thinking people" and called on the British government to seriously consider whether the LVF ceasefires must be regarded as violated. The general secretary of the National Union of Journalists, John Foster, also questioned whether the killing had caused the ceasefire between paramilitary groups to be broken, saying "one of our members has died and that's one too many".

Soon after O'Hagan's assassination, new graffiti appeared on the Mourneview estate with the words "Shove ur dove, and Marty", and members of the Orange Volunteers website welcomed his death as "making the news instead of writing it".

=== Funeral ===
On 1 October 2001, O'Hagan's funeral was held in Lurgan. The funeral was led by Father Brian D'Arcy, who also worked as a columnist for the Sunday World. More than 1,500 people attended, including:

- Jim Campbell, O'Hagan's colleague at the Sunday World
- Des Browne, Parliamentary Under-Secretary of State at the Northern Ireland Office
- Bríd Rodgers, local SDLP MLA

A minute of silence was held by MLAs at Stormont in tribute to O'Hagan. Neither John Reid nor David Trimble attended O'Hagan's funeral.

== Aftermath ==
Just over a month after O'Hagan's death, a Catholic taxi driver attending a call in the Mourneview estate was shot at in a murder attempt. Sinn Féin MLA for Upper Bann Dara O'Hagan said the attack was part of an ongoing attempt by loyalist bitter enders to provoke Irish republican paramilitaries back into armed conflict. A similar event happened in Lurgan five years earlier, when Billy Wright's men murdered a Catholic taxi driver as a "birthday present" for their leader.

=== Murder trial ===
On 16 September 2008, four men appeared at Lisburn Magistrate's Court over O'Hagan's murder:

- 28-year-old Neil Hyde – a member of the LVF since 1996, accused of killing O'Hagan
- 43-year-old Nigel William Leckey – accused of killing O'Hagan
- 42-year-old Robin Andrew "Billy" King – a leading member of the LVF in the Mid-Ulster area, accused of trying to destroy or conceal a silver car
- 28-year-old Mark Kennedy – accused of helping to facilitate the disposal or concealment of the getaway car and impeding the apprehension of the offenders

Kennedy was granted bail in his first appearance, but the others remained in custody. King's brother, Andrew Robert "Drew" King, was also wanted by police in connection with the murder. He had played the bagpipes at Billy Wright's paramilitary-style funeral, and was removed from the RUC and Prison Service pipe bands as a result. Following a request by police to interview him in June 2002, he fled to the Bellshill area of Glasgow, and then to a LVF-owned council house in Bargeddie. He denied any involvement in O'Hagan's killing.

At a bail hearing in October 2008, prosecution lawyers said it was alleged that Leckey had stored the car used by O'Hagan's killers. A witness, known as "Witness A", claimed that on the night of 28 September 2001, he was contacted by one of the accused to arrange a meeting the following morning. The accused had apparently lost control of the car following the shooting, and required help picking up debris from the scene. According to the witness, they then went to a yard owned by Leckey, who had cleaned the car. Leckey was granted bail by the judge, as he was not a "principal party" in the shooting.

In July 2010, murder charges were dropped against Drew King and three of the other men. In September of that year, King took the Sunday World to court, claiming damages for alleged harassment and misuse of private information. Jim McDowell, then-editor of the paper, had published information regarding King's relationships with women, which he defended as part of a character profile.

Hyde had confessed to a number of offences in September 2008 as a member of the LVF involving drugs, arson, firearms, and withholding information regarding a murder. In 2012, he was sentenced to three years in prison. In January 2012, Belfast Crown Court was informed that Hyde had agreed to become an "assisting offender" or supergrass in investigating O'Hagan's death. Hyde stated that he was inside a Lurgan flat on the evening of the murder: he was aware that a loaded gun was present, but was not involved in the killing. He gave the police the names of those in the flat, and also shared information regarding the murder of Graham Edward Marks in 2001. While Hyde originally agreed to testify against O'Hagan's killers, a decision was made by Director of Public Prosecutions Barra McGrory in January 2013 to dismiss the use of his witness statement as unreliable. In June 2013, the Public Prosecution Service for Northern Ireland appealed his lenient sentence with the changed circumstances, but they later dropped the review. The appeal was the first of its kind under the Serious Organised Crime and Police Act 2005. Hyde was placed into witness protection.

=== Calls for investigation ===
The NUJ has called for investigations into O'Hagan's death several times. On the 18th anniversary of O'Hagan's death, NUJ general secretary Michelle Stanistreet and Irish general secretary Séamus Dooley called for an independent inquiry focusing on the assassination itself and the failures of the police in securing a conviction. Dooley has reiterated his concerns multiple times, especially following the murder of Lyra McKee in 2019. On the 19th anniversary of his death, the NUJ released a statement calling for UK and Ireland leaders Boris Johnson and Micheál Martin to support an independent inquiry, and said the failure to convict O'Hagan's killers "emboldens those who see themselves as being above the law".

In September 2014, OSCE Representative on Freedom of the Media Dunja Mijatović called for UK authorities to launch an investigation into the murder, arguing that "the failure to prosecute can create an environment of impunity for those who might attack journalists".

In May 2015, O'Hagan's family announced a £50,000 reward for anyone who had information leading to the conviction of his killers.

=== Allegations of corruption and involvement ===
In 2003, a security source claimed that a loyalist paramilitary questioned over O'Hagan's murder was an informer and Army intelligence agent. They claimed to have accessed files detailing the informer's handlers and the locations of their meetings, including Dungannon (where the gun used to kill O'Hagan was from). A PSNI detective refused to comment on the allegations, but families of those believed to have been killed by the informant had suspected his links previously.

Several of O'Hagan's former colleagues at the Sunday World have alleged police involvement in covering up his death:

- Jim Campbell suggested that police were reluctant to convict anyone due to members of the LVF being "paid police informers". He claimed the names of O'Hagan's assassins were known by the police within hours of his death, and had been warned that LVF members were "driving round Lurgan as if they were looking for someone".
- According to Jim McDowell, the names of O'Hagan's killers have been known to him and others for years, saying "We've named and shamed Martin's killers in the Sunday World on numerous occasions. They've never sued". He referred to them as "touts", and suggested they knew too much about their police handlers to be convicted.
- Richard Sullivan, the Sunday World Belfast Bureau Chief, confirmed the paper's exposing of his killers and promised to continue to "highlight the deficit in Martin's case".

On 28 May 2015, BBC aired a Panorama documentary entitled Britain's Secret Terror Deals, which investigated claims that British security forces colluded with paramilitary groups. PSNI Chief Constable George Hamilton denied any police cover-up regarding O'Hagan's death and the subsequent investigations. In the episode, former Police Ombudsman Nuala O'Loan said that state agencies had "operated outside the rules" and were responsible for the deaths of "hundreds and hundreds and hundreds of people".

In 2017, Séamus Dooley also hinted at links between the police and those responsible for the murder, saying the lack of conviction "cast a long shadow over the criminal justice system and policing in Northern Ireland".

=== Police Ombudsmen reports ===
In October 2006, O'Hagan's siblings made a formal request to Police Ombudsman Nuala O'Loan, raising concerns that no one had been charged in the five years since the murder despite the police apparently knowing who was responsible. Eight years into the investigation, new Police Ombudsman Michael Maguire was able to secure police intelligence regarding the murders of O'Hagan and around 60 others, after he threatened the PSNI with a court case.

Following the dismissal of Hyde as a witness, the murder case was referred by Barra McGrory to Michael Maguire in September 2013.

=== Effects on the Sunday World ===
Since O'Hagan's death, Sunday World owner Independent News & Media has afforded security measures to its journalists, such as installing bulletproof windows and panic buttons in their houses.

Staff at the paper had received around 50 recorded threats by September 2011, such as former crime editor Paul Williams. In June 2018, the paper's Dublin office was sent a bottle labelled "sulphuric acid", which was seen an attack on its staff. The package was addressed to a former employee of the paper, and one administrator was injured while receiving it. In May 2020, the Sunday World and the Sunday Life were warned by police that the Ulster Defence Association were planning attacks on their journalists. Sunday World crime reporter Patricia Devlin, who like O'Hagan has reported on drug gangs and their paramilitary connections, has received threats and been doxed by fake accounts and criminals featured in her stories.

=== 25th anniversary and calls for new investigation ===
On 28 September 2026, to mark the 25th anniversary of O'Hagan's death, the human rights organisations Committee to Protect Journalists and Amnesty International called for a "fresh investigation" into the killing, as well as the immediate publication of the Police Ombudsman's report.

== See also ==
- Veronica Guerin
