= Barry Shaw =

Barry Shaw may refer to:

- Barry Shaw (barrister), Northern Irish barrister and Director of Public Prosecutions
- Barry Shaw (footballer) (born 1948), English football winger for Darlington
- Barry Shaw (politician), candidate in National Assembly for Wales election, 2007
- Barry Shaw, Senior Associate for Public Diplomacy of the Israel Institute for Strategic Studies
