= The Troubles in Maghera =

Incidents in Maghera, Northern Ireland during the Troubles

During the Troubles in Northern Ireland, a total of 14 people were killed in Troubles-related violence in or near the village of Maghera, County Londonderry. Of the 13 from Northern Ireland, 11 were Protestant and two were Catholic. Seven of the Protestant victims were members of the security forces (six Ulster Defence Regiment (UDR), two Royal Ulster Constabulary (RUC), one British Army) and another was the ten-year-old daughter of a UDR man, killed along with her father by a bomb planted in his car. Another victim was shot after being mistaken for his co-worker, an UDR member. Only three of the security force victims were killed while on-duty. Both the RUC men were killed by the Irish National Liberation Army; all the other Protestant victims were killed by the Provisional Irish Republican Army. Both the Catholic victims were killed by loyalist paramilitaries, one by the Ulster Volunteer Force and one by the Loyalist Volunteer Force. One was a Sinn Féin councillor.
