= Dara O'Hagan =

Irish politician (born 1964)

Member of the Northern Ireland Assembly for Upper Bann
- In office 25 June 1998 – 26 November 2003
- Preceded by: New Creation
- Succeeded by: John O'Dowd

Personal details
- Born: 29 August 1964 (age 62) Lurgan, Northern Ireland
- Party: Sinn Féin
- Parent: Joe B. O'Hagan (father)
- Relatives: Martin O'Hagan (cousin)
- Education: Queens University, Belfast

Dara O'Hagan (born 29 August 1964) is an Irish republican activist and former politician in Northern Ireland. She was elected in 1998 to the Northern Ireland Assembly as a Sinn Féin member for Upper Bann.

O'Hagan has obtained a BA (Hons) Combined Humanities (History and Politics) from the University of Ulster and an MSc in Irish Politics and a PhD from Queens University, Belfast. Her father was prominent republican J. B. O'Hagan.

Northern Ireland Assembly
New assembly	MLA for Upper Bann; 1998–2003	Succeeded by John O'Dowd
