= The Helicopter Song =

Song by the Wolfe Tones

"Up and Away (The Helicopter Song)" was a number one single in the Republic of Ireland for the Irish traditional folk band the Wolfe Tones.

== Background ==
Originally written by Sean McGinley from Castlefin, County Donegal, the song tells the story of the 1973 escape of three Provisional Irish Republican Army (IRA) prisoners from Dublin's Mountjoy Prison. On Hallowe'en, an IRA member hijacked a helicopter and forced the pilot to fly to Mountjoy where the three prisoners, including Seamus Twomey, were lifted by helicopter from the exercise yard.

== Lyrics and style ==
As with some other Wolfe Tones songs, the lyrics use a comical tone to show sympathy with the Irish republican cause and narrate events linked to the Troubles in Ireland without using aggressive or sectarian language, an attribute which contributed to its popularity.

== Chart success ==
The song was immediately prohibited from being played on RTÉ stations or was severely restricted, sources vary. Despite that, the song sold 12,000 single records in the first week of release, taking it to the number one position in the Irish Singles Chart on 22 November 1973, and held that position for four weeks, until it was replaced by Slade's Merry Christmas Everybody.

Preceded by "For The Good Times" by Perry Como	Irish Singles Chart number one single November 22, 1973	Succeeded by "Merry Christmas Everybody" by Slade
