= Martin McGuinness =

Irish republican politician and IRA leader (1950–2017)

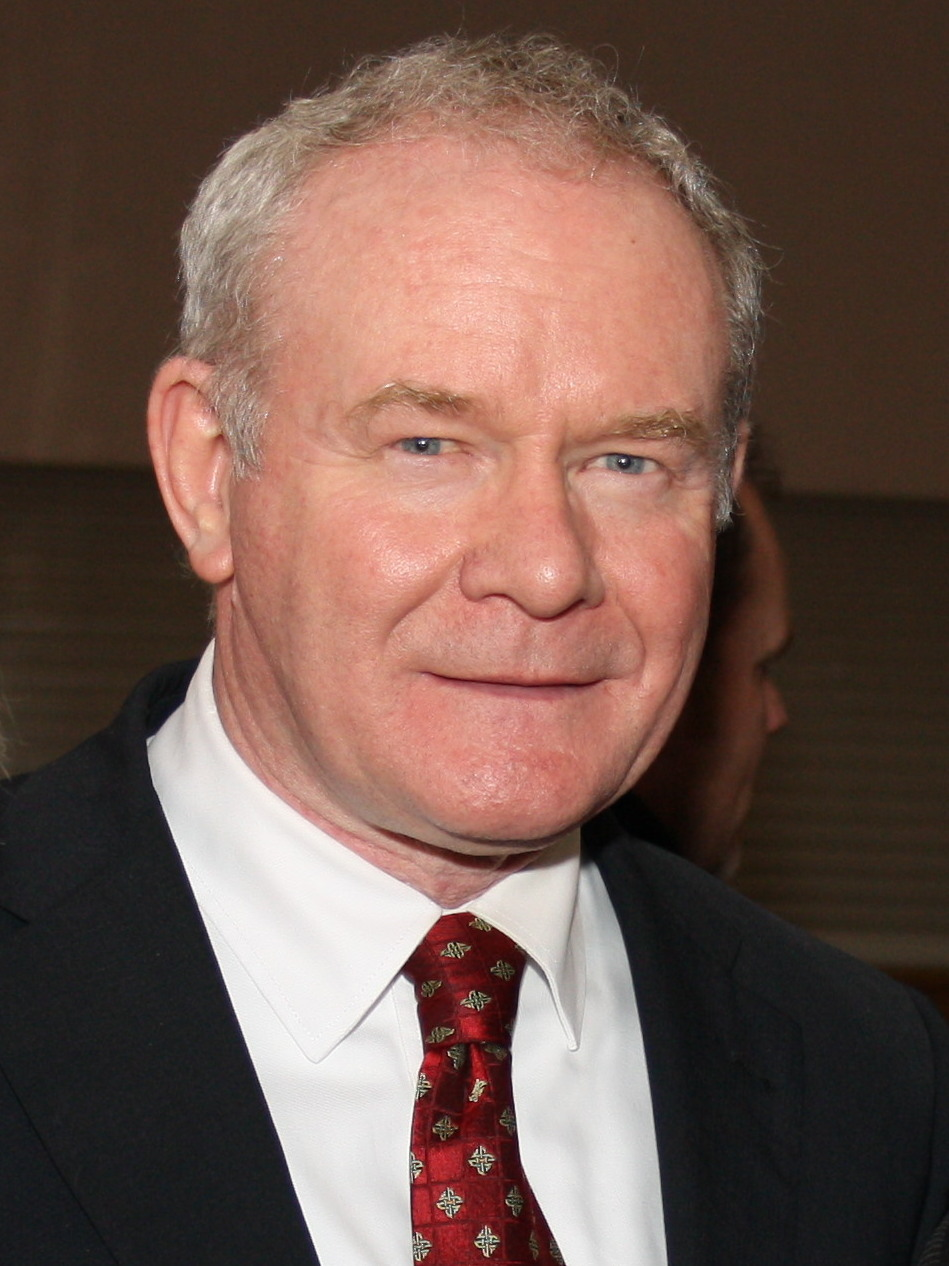
- McGuinness in 2012

Deputy First Minister of Northern Ireland
- In office 8 May 2007 – 9 January 2017 (Note: John O'Dowd served as Acting dFM from 20 September 2011 to 31 October 2011 while McGuinness campaigned in the 2011 Irish presidential election) Serving with Ian Paisley, Peter Robinson, Arlene Foster
- Preceded by: Peter Hain (Note: During the periods of suspension of the Northern Ireland Executive, the Secretaries of State for Northern Ireland assumed the responsibilities of the First Minister and deputy First Minister. The final Northern Ireland Secretary to act as First Minister was Peter Hain.) (As Secretary of State for Northern Ireland); Mark Durkan (2002)
- Succeeded by: Michelle O'Neill (2020)

Minister of Education
- In office 2 December 1999 – 14 October 2002
- First Minister: David Trimble (FM); Seamus Mallon (dFM); Mark Durkan (dFM)
- Preceded by: Office established
- Succeeded by: Caitríona Ruane
Parliamentary representation
Member of the Legislative Assembly for Foyle
In office 6 May 2016 – 26 January 2017
Preceded by	Maeve McLaughlin
Succeeded by	Elisha McCallion
Member of the Legislative Assembly for Mid Ulster
In office 25 June 1998 – 6 May 2016
Preceded by	Constituency established
Succeeded by	Linda Dillon
Member of Parliament for Mid Ulster
In office 1 May 1997 – 2 January 2013
Preceded by	William McCrea
Succeeded by	Francie Molloy
Majority	15,363 (37.6%)

Personal details
- Born: James Martin Pacelli McGuinness; 23 May 1950 Derry, Northern Ireland
- Died: 21 March 2017 (aged 66) Derry, Northern Ireland
- Party: Sinn Féin
- Spouse: Bernadette Canning (m. 1974)
- Children: 4

Military service
- Branch/service: Official IRA; Provisional IRA
- Battles/wars: The Troubles
- ^a John O'Dowd served as Acting dFM from 20 September 2011 to 31 October 2011 while McGuinness campaigned in the 2011 Irish presidential election^b During the periods of suspension of the Northern Ireland Executive, the Secretaries of State for Northern Ireland assumed the responsibilities of the First Minister and deputy First Minister. The final Northern Ireland Secretary to act as First Minister was Peter Hain.

James Martin Pacelli McGuinness (Irish: Séamus Máirtín Pacelli Mag Aonghusa; 23 May 1950 – 21 March 2017) was an Irish republican politician and statesman for Sinn Féin and a leader within the Provisional Irish Republican Army (IRA) during The Troubles. He was the deputy First Minister of Northern Ireland from May 2007 to January 2017.

McGuinness served as the Member of Parliament (MP) for Mid Ulster from 1997 until his resignation in 2013. Like all Sinn Féin MPs, McGuinness followed abstentionism in the Westminster Parliament. Working alongside US Special Envoy George Mitchell, McGuinness was also one of the main architects of the Good Friday Agreement which formally cemented the Northern Ireland peace process and established the Northern Ireland Assembly.

In 1998, McGuinness was first elected as the Member of the Legislative Assembly (MLA) for Mid Ulster. He served as Minister of Education in the Northern Ireland Executive under First Minister David Trimble from 1999 to 2002. Following the St Andrews Agreement and the 2007 Northern Ireland Assembly election, he became deputy First Minister of Northern Ireland on 8 May 2007, with the Democratic Unionist Party (DUP) leader Ian Paisley becoming First Minister. In 2008 and 2016, he was reappointed as deputy First Minister to serve alongside Peter Robinson and Arlene Foster, respectively. He was Sinn Féin's candidate for President of Ireland in the 2011 Irish presidential election.

In the 2016 Northern Ireland Assembly election, McGuinness was elected as the MLA for Foyle. On 9 January 2017, McGuinness resigned as deputy First Minister in protest over the Renewable Heat Incentive scandal. He announced on 19 January that he would not be standing for re-election in the 2017 Northern Ireland Assembly election due to ill health. He reportedly suffered from amyloidosis, a condition that attacks the vital organs, and retired shortly before his death on 21 March 2017, aged 66.

== IRA ==
McGuinness acknowledged that he was a former IRA member, but stated that he left the IRA in 1974. He originally joined the Official IRA, unaware of the split at the December 1969 Army Convention, switching to the Provisional IRA soon after. By the start of 1972, at the age of 21, he was second-in-command of the IRA in Derry, a position he held at the time of Bloody Sunday on 30 January 1972, when thirteen civilians were shot and killed in the city by British soldiers of the 1st Battalion, Parachute Regiment during a civil rights march, with a fourteenth victim dying four months later.

During the Saville Inquiry into the events of that day, Paddy Ward stated he had been the leader of the Fianna, the youth wing of the IRA at the time of Bloody Sunday. He said that McGuinness and an anonymous IRA member gave him bomb parts that morning. He said that his organisation intended to attack city centre premises in Derry on the same day. In response, McGuinness said the statements were "fantasy", while Gearóid Ó hEára (formerly Gerry O'Hara), a Derry Sinn Féin councillor, stated that he and not Ward was the Fianna leader at the time.

The inquiry concluded that, although McGuinness was "engaged in paramilitary activity" at the time of Bloody Sunday and had probably been armed with a Thompson submachine gun, there was insufficient evidence to make any finding other than they were "sure that he did not engage in any activity that provided any of the soldiers with any justification for opening fire".

McGuinness negotiated alongside Gerry Adams with the Secretary of State for Northern Ireland, Willie Whitelaw, in 1972. In 1973, he was convicted by the Republic of Ireland's Special Criminal Court, after being arrested near a car containing 250 pounds (110 kg) of explosives and nearly 5,000 rounds of ammunition. He refused to recognise the court, and was sentenced to six months' imprisonment. In court, he declared his membership of the Provisional IRA without equivocation: "We have fought against the killing of our people... I am a member of Óglaigh na hÉireann and very, very proud of it".

After his release, and another conviction in the Republic of Ireland for IRA membership in 1974, he became increasingly prominent in Sinn Féin, the political wing of the republican movement. He was in indirect contact with British intelligence during the 1981 hunger strikes, and again in the early 1990s. He was elected to the Northern Ireland Assembly at Stormont in 1982, representing Londonderry. He was the second candidate elected after Social Democratic and Labour Party leader John Hume. As with all elected members of Sinn Féin and the SDLP, he did not take up his seat. On 9 December 1982, McGuinness, Gerry Adams and Danny Morrison were banned from entering Great Britain under the Prevention of Terrorism Act by the Home Secretary, William Whitelaw.

In August 1993, he was the subject of a two-part special by The Cook Report, a Central TV investigative documentary series presented by Roger Cook. It accused him of continuing involvement in IRA activity, of attending an interrogation and of encouraging Frank Hegarty, a British informer, to return to Derry from a safe house in England. Hegarty's mother Rose appeared on the programme to tell of telephone calls to McGuinness and of Hegarty's subsequent murder. McGuinness denied her account and denounced the programme saying "I have never been in the IRA. I don't have any sway over the IRA". The editor of the Cook Report accused the British government of failing to prosecute McGuinness, which resulted in the Royal Ulster Constabulary (RUC) launching Operation Taurus; an investigation into McGuinness's IRA activity. Following the IRA ceasefire in August 1994, detectives were refused permission to arrest and question McGuinness due to an RUC internal memo stating "that the UK government may soon be meeting senior members of Sinn Féin, including Mr McGuinness". On 10 March 1995 the Director of Public Prosecutions for Northern Ireland, Alasdair Fraser, stated there was insufficient evidence against McGuinness to ensure a reasonable chance of obtaining a conviction.

In 2005, Michael McDowell, the Irish Tánaiste, stated McGuinness, along with Gerry Adams and Martin Ferris, were members of the seven-man IRA Army Council. McGuinness denied this, saying he was no longer an IRA member. Experienced Troubles journalist Peter Taylor presented further apparent evidence of McGuinness's role in the IRA in his documentary Age of Terror, shown in April 2008. In his documentary, Taylor alleges that McGuinness was the head of the IRA's Northern Command and had advance knowledge of the IRA's 1987 Remembrance Day bombing, which left 12 people dead.

== Chief negotiator and Minister of Education ==
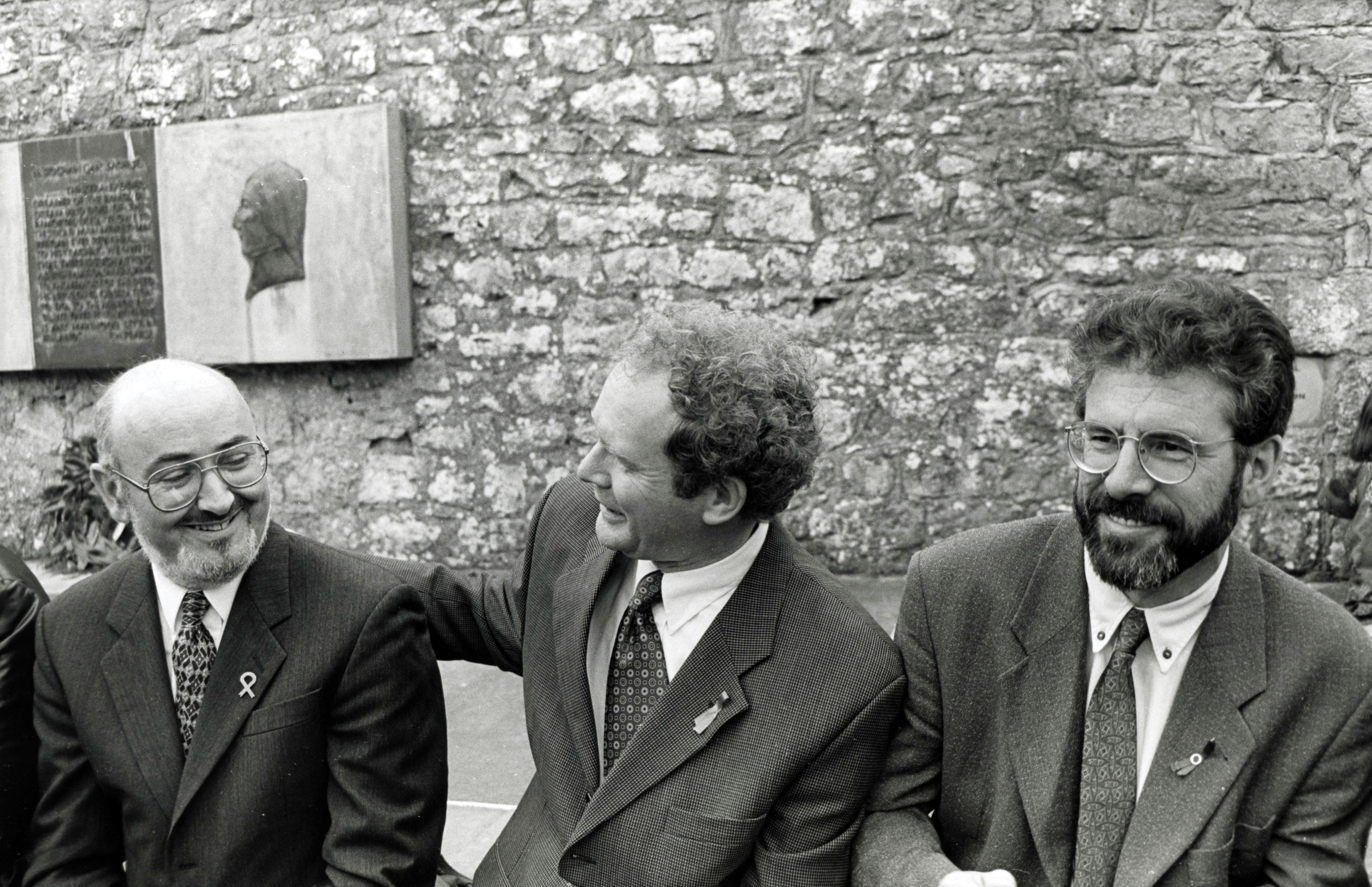
McGuinness with Gerry Adams and Caoimhghín Ó Caoláin in 1997.

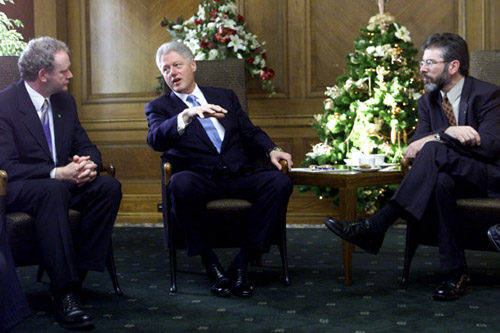
United States president Bill Clinton meeting with Gerry Adams and McGuinness in the Stormont Parliament Buildings in December 2000. McGuinness as deputy First Minister United States president George W. Bush meeting with Ian Paisley and McGuinness in the Oval Office in December 2007. McGuinness, Ian Paisley, and Scottish first minister Alex Salmond in 2008. United States president Barack Obama with Peter Robinson and McGuinness in March 2009. United States Secretary of State Hillary Clinton with Peter Robinson and McGuinness in March 2011.

He became Sinn Féin's chief negotiator in the Northern Ireland peace process negotiations which led to the Good Friday Agreement. At the time of his death, former US president Bill Clinton noted that McGuinness was the one who personally oversaw the agreement's arms decommissioning phase. Former British prime minister Tony Blair also acknowledged the leading role which McGuinness had in ensuring the agreement would be enforced.

He was elected to the Northern Ireland Forum in 1996 representing Foyle. Having contested Foyle unsuccessfully at the 1983, 1987 and 1992 Westminster elections, he became MP for Mid Ulster in 1997 and after the agreement was concluded, was returned as a member of the Assembly for the same constituency. He was nominated by his party for a ministerial position in the power-sharing executive, where he became Minister of Education. One of his acts as Minister of Education was his decision to scrap the 11-plus exam, which he had failed as a child. He was re-elected to the Westminster Parliament in 2001, 2005 and 2010.

In May 2003, transcripts of telephone calls between McGuinness and British officials including Mo Mowlam, the Secretary of State for Northern Ireland, and Jonathan Powell, Tony Blair's Chief of Staff, were published in a biography of McGuinness entitled From Guns to Government by Kathryn Johnston and Liam Clarke. The tapes had been made by MI5, and the authors of the book were arrested under the Official Secrets Act. The conversations showed an easy and friendly relationship between McGuinness and Powell. He joked with Powell about unionist MPs while Mowlam referred to him as "babe" and discussed her difficulties with Blair. In another transcript, he praised Bill Clinton to Gerry Adams.

== St Andrews Agreement and deputy First Minister ==
In the weeks following the St Andrews Agreement, the four biggest parties—the DUP, Sinn Féin, the Ulster Unionist Party and the SDLP—indicated their choice of ministries in the Executive and nominated members to fill them. The Assembly convened on 8 May 2007, and Paisley and McGuinness were nominated as First Minister and deputy First Minister respectively.

On 8 December 2007, while visiting President of the United States George W. Bush in the White House with the Northern Ireland First Minister Ian Paisley, McGuinness said to the press, "Up until the 26 March this year, Ian Paisley and I never had a conversation about anything—not even about the weather—and now we have worked very closely together over the last seven months and there's been no angry words between us.... This shows we are set for a new course."

== 2011 Irish presidential campaign ==
On 16 September 2011, McGuinness was announced as the Sinn Féin candidate in the 2011 Irish presidential election. In the election held on 27 October 2011, McGuinness received 243,030 first preference votes, placing third behind Michael D. Higgins (elected president) and Seán Gallagher. McGuinness had earned endorsements from Colm Meaney, Roma Downey, and Fionnula Flanagan among others; and had performed well considering Sinn Féin's position in the Republic at that time.

McGuinness was the only candidate ineligible to vote in the election as, although an Irish citizen, he was not ordinarily a resident in the Republic of Ireland. Following the election, McGuinness formally returned to the role of deputy First Minister of Northern Ireland on 31 October.

== Resignation from the House of Commons ==
On 30 December 2012 McGuinness announced that he had formally resigned as the MP for Mid-Ulster, stating "I have served formal notice of my resignation from the position of MP for Mid-Ulster with immediate effect. This is in line with my party's commitment to end double jobbing." To do this, he was made Steward of the Manor of Northstead on 2 January 2013 by Chancellor George Osborne, making him an employee of the Crown and thus ineligible for membership of the House of Commons.

== Resignation as deputy First Minister ==
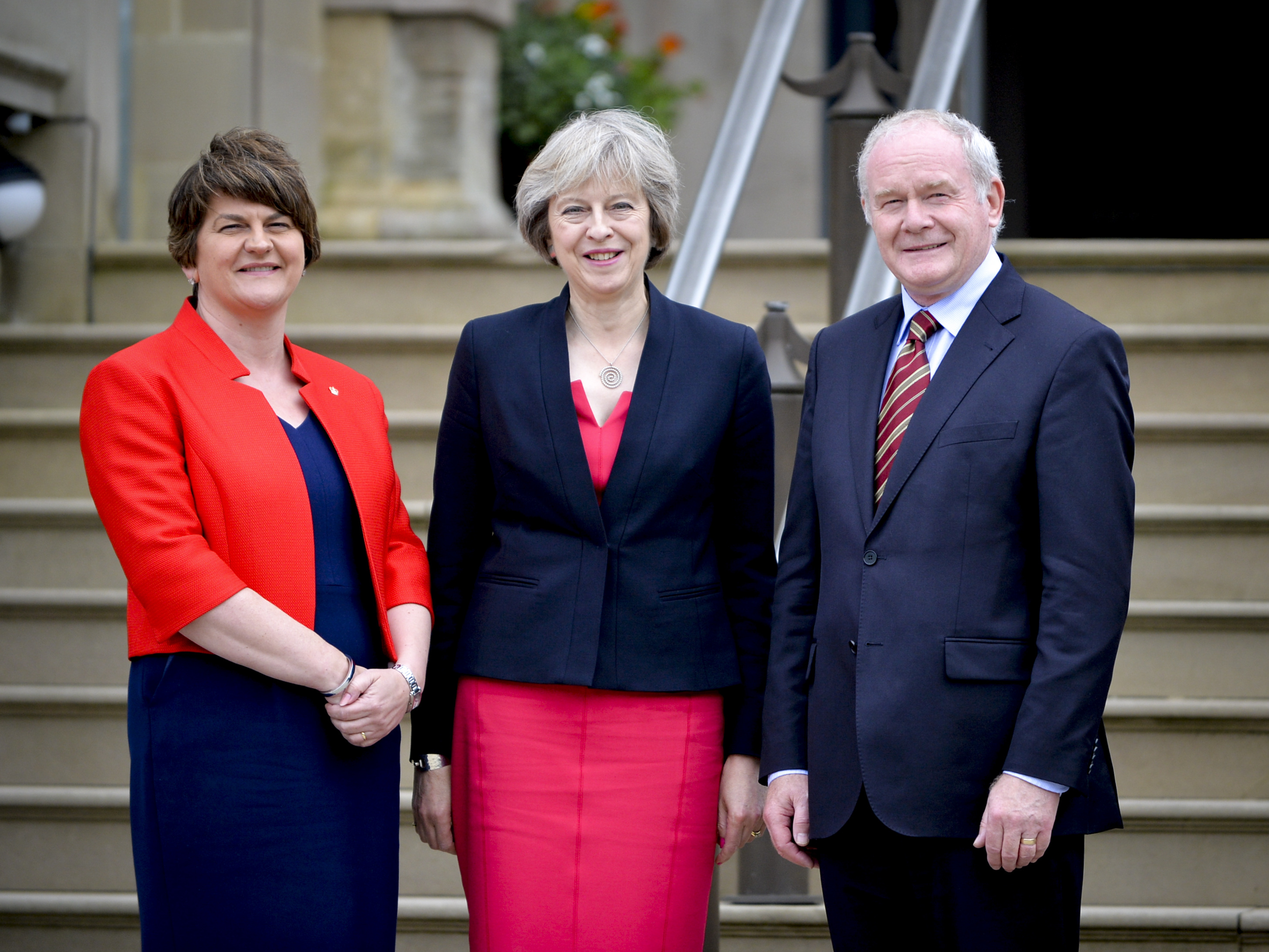
British prime minister Theresa May meets with McGuinness and First Minister Arlene Foster in 2016.

In November 2016, a scandal came to light surrounding the Renewable Heat Incentive, an energy incentive championed by Arlene Foster when she was Minister for Enterprise, Trade, and Incentives in 2012. The incentive would cost the Northern Ireland Executive £480m over 20 years, and was marred by allegations of fraud, which were not acknowledged or acted upon by Foster or the DUP (McGuinness' and Sinn Féin's partner in government). McGuinness and others in Sinn Féin called for Foster to step aside as First Minister to allow for independent inquiries, but she refused. She made a statement before the assembly on 19 December without McGuinness' approval (as required under the power-sharing agreement), resulting in Sinn Féin and the opposition parties all walking out of the assembly.

Sinn Féin President Gerry Adams indicated on 8 January 2017 that McGuinness could resign, thus vacating both his and Foster's offices, if Foster did not agree to temporarily step aside to allow an independent inquiry. McGuinness resigned the following day; in his statements to the press, he said "Today is the right time to call a halt to the DUP's arrogance", and said that Foster had a "clear conflict of interest" in the affair. Another reason cited for his resignation was the decision by DUP Minister for Communities Paul Givan to remove £50,000 in funding from the Líofa Gaeltacht Bursary scheme, a yearly programme that allowed 100 school-age children to travel to the Donegal Gaeltacht to learn the Irish language. Sinn Féin refused to nominate a successor to McGuinness before 16 January, resulting in the Secretary of State for Northern Ireland, James Brokenshire, calling for new elections scheduled for 2 March. McGuinness subsequently announced that he would not run for re-election, due to ill health.

== Personal life ==
McGuinness's mother was from County Donegal in the northwest of Ireland. She moved to Derry to work in a shirt factory. It was in Derry that she met McGuinness's father.

One of McGuinness's middle names, Pacelli, was after Pope Pius XII (Eugenio Pacelli).

McGuinness attended St. Eugene's Primary School and later the Christian Brothers technical college, leaving school at the age of 15.

McGuinness married Bernadette Canning in 1974; they had four children, two girls and two boys. He was a fan of the Derry Gaelic football and hurling teams and played both sports when he was younger. He grew up just 50 metres from Celtic Park, the home of Derry's Gaelic Athletic Association. His older brother Tom played Gaelic football for Derry. He supported Derry City F.C. where his younger brother Paul played for the Candystripes.

McGuinness supported Manchester United from the age of eight. McGuinness also had an interest in cricket – sometimes extending his support to the England cricket team, as well as that of Ireland.

In March 2019, McGuinness was posthumously awarded a certificate of honour by the mayor of San Francisco London Breed for his "courageous service in the military". The nomination had been made by the United Irish Societies who had appointed him honorary marshal in the St. Patrick's Day parade. Breed apologised two days later following controversy.

== Health concerns and death ==
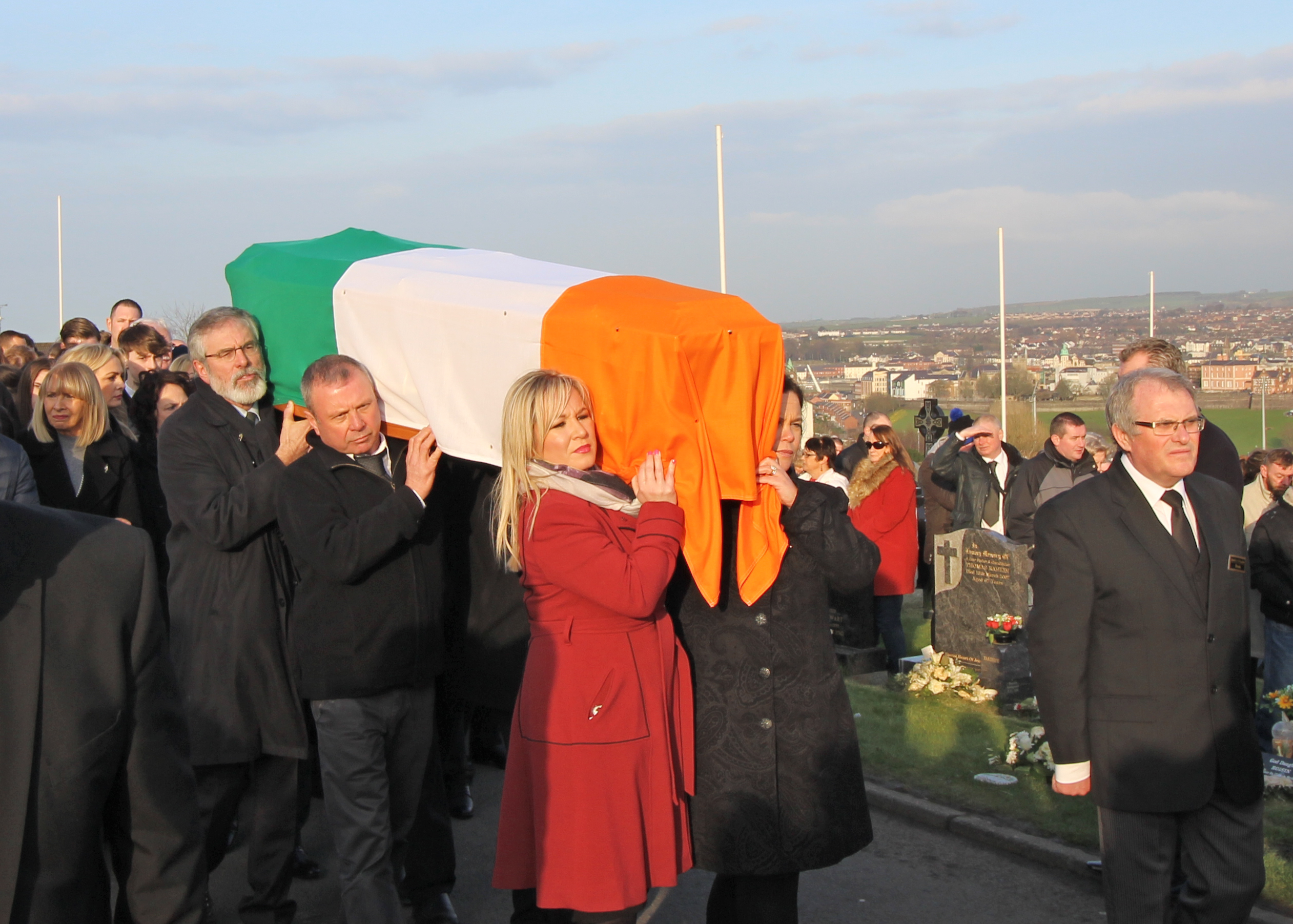
The funeral procession of McGuinness with coffin bearers including Gerry Adams, Michelle O'Neill and Mary Lou McDonald.

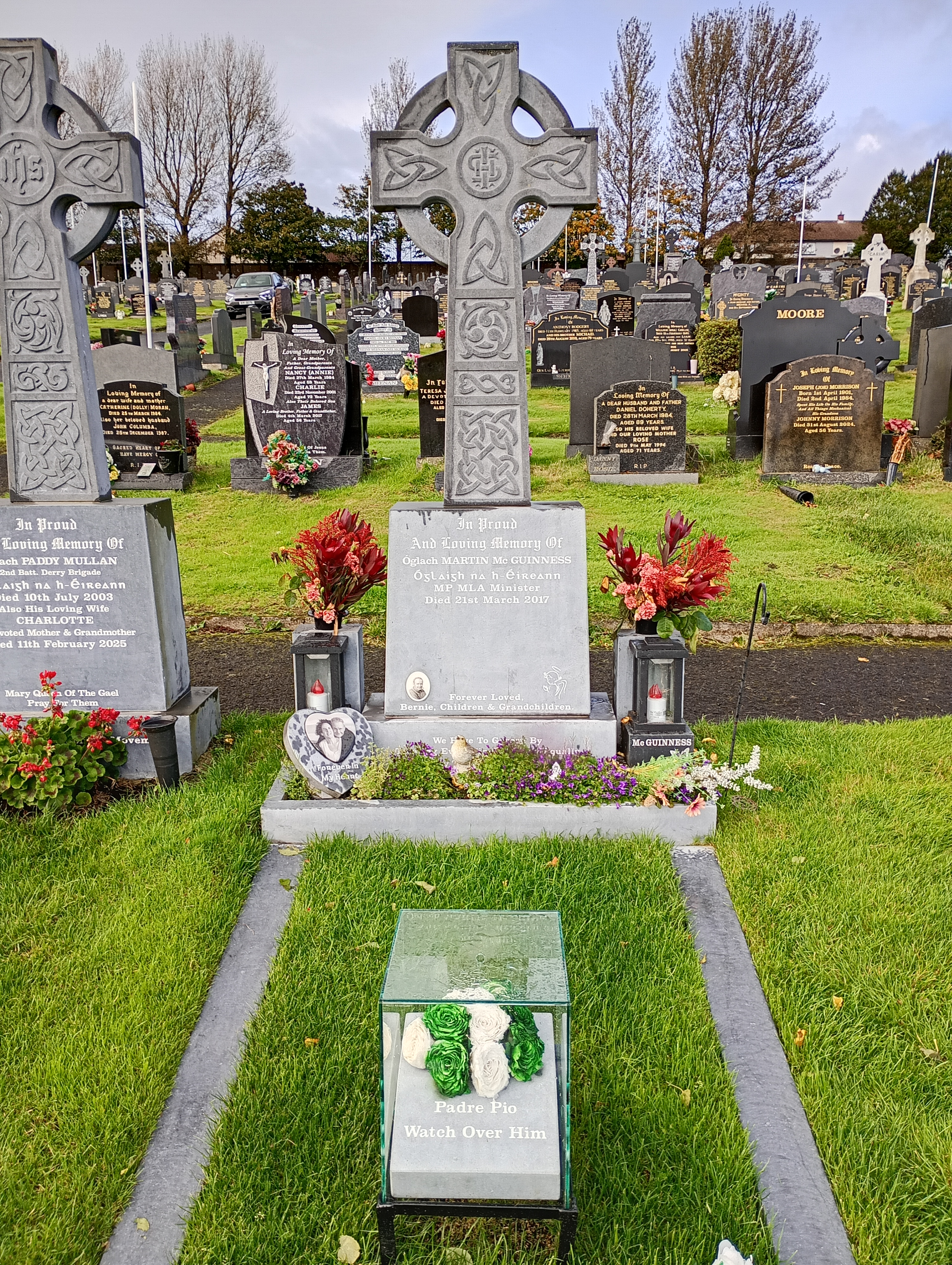
McGuinness's grave in Derry City Cemetery

In December 2016, McGuinness was advised against making a planned visit to China on medical grounds, initially announcing that this was due to "unforeseen personal circumstances." After subsequent tests, he was told that he was suffering from "a very serious illness." McGuinness and Sinn Féin declined to give details of his illness to the media. In January 2017, The Irish Times disclosed that McGuinness was suffering from amyloidosis, a rare incurable disease that affects the internal organs. McGuinness complained that the Times had breached his privacy and that the paper had inaccurately reported the condition as genetic, thereby causing distress to his family.

On 6 March 2017, McGuinness was hospitalised at Derry's Altnagelvin Area Hospital due to ill health. He died on 21 March, at the age of 66.

== Notes ==
Northern Ireland Assembly (1982)
New assembly	Member of the Northern Ireland Assembly for Londonderry; 1982–1986	Assembly abolished
Northern Ireland Forum
New forum	Member of the Northern Ireland Forum for Foyle; 1996–1998	Forum abolished
Parliament of the United Kingdom
Preceded by William McCrea	Member of Parliament for Mid Ulster; 1997–2013	Succeeded by Francie Molloy
Northern Ireland Assembly
New assembly	Member of the Legislative Assembly for Mid Ulster; 1999–2016	Succeeded by Linda Dillon
Preceded by Maeve McLaughlin	Member of the Legislative Assembly for Foyle; 2016–2017	Succeeded by Elisha McCallion
Political offices
New office	Minister of Education; 1999–2002	Vacant Office suspended Title next held by Caitríona Ruane
Vacant Office suspended Title last held by Mark Durkan	Deputy First Minister of Northern Ireland; 2007–2017	Vacant Office suspended Title next held by Michelle O'Neill
