= Joe O'Hagan =

Joe O'Hagan may refer to:

- Joseph O'Hagan (1900–1978), British trade union leader
- Joe B. O'Hagan (died 2001), Irish Republican Army member
