= Tom McGuinness =

Tom or Thomas McGuinness may refer to:

- Tom McGuinness (Gaelic footballer), Irish Gaelic footballer
- Tom McGuinness (musician) (born 1941), guitarist and songwriter
- Tom McGuinness (artist) (1926–2006), British coal miner and artist
- Thomas McGuinness, first officer on American Airlines Flight 11

== See also ==
- Tom McGinnis (born 1947), American professional golfer
