= Barry Shaw (barrister) =

Sir Barry Shaw CB KC
- Born: Charles Barry Shaw; 12 April 1923
- Died: 30 September 2010 (aged 87)
- Education: Queen's University Belfast
- Occupations: Barrister, prosecutor
- Title: Director of Public Prosecutions for Northern Ireland
- Term: 1972 to 1989
- Successor: Alasdair Fraser
- Military career
- Allegiance: United Kingdom
- Branch: British Army
- Service years: 1942–1946
- Conflicts: Second World War: Normandy Landings; North West Europe Campaign

Sir Charles Barry Shaw, CB, KC (12 April 1923 – 30 September 2010) was a Northern Irish barrister. From 1972 to 1989, he served as the Director of Public Prosecutions for Northern Ireland; he was the first holder of this post.

== Early life and education ==
Shaw was born on 12 April 1923 in Balmoral, Belfast, Northern Ireland. He was educated at Inchmarlo House in Belfast and at Pannal Ash College in Harrogate, England. After leaving school, he matriculated into Queen's University Belfast to study science. He left university in 1942 to serve in the military. He returned to university in 1946, and switched to law. He graduated with a Bachelor of Laws (LLB) degree.

=== Military service ===
Shaw took a break from his university studies to serve in the British Army during Second World War. On 5 December 1942, he was commissioned into the Royal Regiment of Artillery as a second lieutenant. He then served in the 97 Anti-Tank Regiment attached to the 15th (Scottish) Infantry Division. He saw active serve in the Normandy Landings and in the North West Europe Campaign. He was demobilised in 1946.

== Legal career ==
In 1948, Shaw was called to the Bar of Northern Ireland, thereby becoming a barrister. From 1948 to 1952, he worked in private practice. He was appointed Junior Crown Counsel (a prosecutor) for County Fermanagh, and then for County Tyrone and County Antrim. In 1964, he was appointed Senior Crown Counsel for County Londonderry, and later for County Antrim and Belfast. On 10 April 1972, he was appointed to the newly created position of Director of Public Prosecutions for Northern Ireland. As such, he was head of the Public Prosecution Service for Northern Ireland "throughout the worst years of the Troubles". He retired from the post in 1989, and was succeeded by Alasdair Fraser.

In December 1964, Shaw was called to the Inner Bar of Northern Ireland, thereby becoming a Queen's Counsel (QC). He was elected a Bencher in 1968. He was also called to Bar at Middle Temple in 1970 which allowed him to practice as a barrister in England and Wales.

== Personal life ==
In 1950, Shaw married Jean Boyd; they later divorced. In 1964, he married Jane (née Phillips); she predeceased her husband, dying in January 2010.

Shaw died on 30 September 2010, aged 87. A memorial service was held at Holy Trinity Church, Glencraig in Holywood, County Down.

== Honours ==
In the 1974 Queen's Birthday Honours, Shaw was appointed a Companion of the Order of the Bath (CB) in recognition of his service as Director of Public Prosecutions for Northern Ireland (DPP). In the 1980 New Year Honours, he was appointed a Knight Bachelor, and thereby granted the title sir, in recognition of his service as DPP. On 4 March 1980, he was knighted by Queen Elizabeth II during a ceremony at Buckingham Palace. He was made an Honorary Bencher of Middle Temple in 1986.

Legal offices
New office	Director of Public Prosecutions for Northern Ireland; 1972 to 1989	Succeeded by Sir Alasdair Fraser
