= John O'Dowd =

Minister for Infrastructure of Northern Ireland since 2024

John O'Dowd MLA
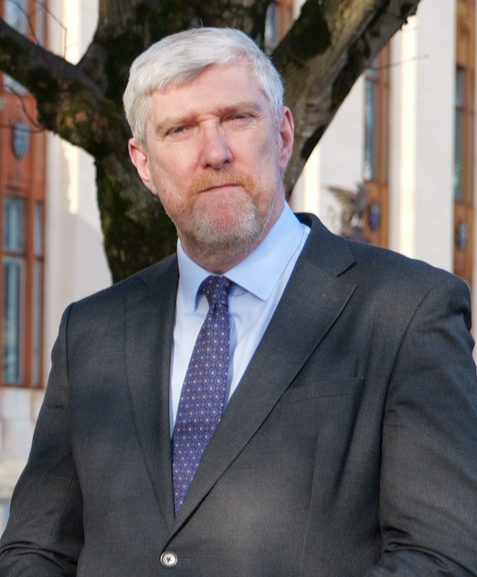
- O'Dowd in 2025

Minister for Finance
- Incumbent
- Assumed office 3 February 2025
- First Minister: Michelle O'Neill
- Preceded by: Caoimhe Archibald

Minister for Infrastructure
- In office 3 February 2024 – 3 February 2025
- First Minister: Michelle O'Neill
- Preceded by: Himself (2022)
- Succeeded by: Liz Kimmins
- In office 16 May 2022 – 27 October 2022
- First Minister: Vacant
- Preceded by: Nichola Mallon
- Succeeded by: Himself (2024)

Minister for Education
- In office 16 May 2011 – 25 May 2016
- First Minister: Peter Robinson
- Preceded by: Caitríona Ruane
- Succeeded by: Peter Weir

Deputy First Minister of Northern Ireland
- Acting; 20 September 2011 – 31 October 2011 Serving with Peter Robinson
- Preceded by: Martin McGuinness
- Succeeded by: Martin McGuinness

Member of the Legislative Assembly for Upper Bann
- Incumbent
- Assumed office 26 November 2003
- Preceded by: Dara O'Hagan

Member of Craigavon Borough Council
- In office 21 May 1997 – 5 May 2011
- Preceded by: Brendan McConville
- Succeeded by: Mairéad O'Dowd
- Constituency: Loughside

Personal details
- Born: John Fitzgerald O'Dowd; 10 May 1967 (age 59) Tullylish, Northern Ireland
- Party: Sinn Féin
- Spouse: Mary O'Dowd
- Children: 3
- Occupation: Politician

John Fitzgerald O'Dowd (born 10 May 1967) is an Irish Sinn Féin politician. He has been a Member of the Northern Ireland Assembly for Upper Bann since 2003, and has served as Minister for Finance since February 2025. He served as Minister for Infrastructure from May to October 2022, and again from February 2024 until February 2025. He served as Minister for Education in the Stormont Executive from 2011 to 2016. He briefly took on the duties of deputy First Minister in 2011 while Martin McGuinness ran in the 2011 Irish presidential election.

In 2019, O'Dowd launched an unsuccessful bid to unseat Michelle O'Neill as Vice President of Sinn Féin at the party's ard fheis and received the endorsement of Fermanagh and South Tyrone MP Michelle Gildernew. However, he refused to give media interviews to explain his decision to challenge O'Neill.

== Early career ==
O'Dowd was born in 1967 in Tullylish, a rural community between Lurgan and Banbridge. He had trained as a chef before engaging in politics. He began his political career serving for 14 years as a councillor on Craigavon Borough Council and previously served as a school governor. O'Dowd has served as Chair of Upper Bann Sinn Féin and a member of the party's Six County Executive, O'Dowd was leader of the Sinn Féin group on Craigavon Council. In 2003 he was elected as MLA for Upper Bann and in 2005 unsuccessfully contested the same-named Westminster constituency. Between 2007 and 2011 he was Sinn Féin group leader in the Assembly and served as Chair of the Public Accounts Committee before becoming a member of the Education Committee in 2008.

On 13 May 2022, he was confirmed as the 'caretaker' Infrastructure Minister replacing Nichola Mallon of the SDLP who failed to retain her seat in the previous week's election. He took office on 16 May 2022.

== Acting deputy First Minister ==
After Sinn Féin nominated Martin McGuinness as its candidate in the 2011 Irish presidential election, O'Dowd took over the duties of deputy First Minister on a temporary basis from 20 September to 31 October 2011.

== Personal life ==
O'Dowd is married and has three children.

Northern Ireland Assembly
Preceded by Dara O'Hagan	MLA for Upper Bann; 2003–present	Incumbent
Political offices
Preceded by Caitríona Ruane	Minister of Education; 2011–2016	Succeeded by Peter Weir
Preceded by Martin McGuinness	Acting deputy First Minister of Northern Ireland; 2011	Succeeded by Martin McGuinness
