= Barra McGrory =

Northern Irish former Director of Public Prosecutions

Barra McGrory KC

Director of Public Prosecutions for Northern Ireland
- In office November 2011 – December 2017
- Preceded by: Sir Alasdair Fraser
- Succeeded by: Stephen Herron

Personal details
- Born: 1960 (age 65–66) Belfast, Northern Ireland
- Education: Queen's University Belfast
- Profession: Solicitor and barrister

Barra McGrory, KC (born 1959) is a Northern Ireland solicitor and barrister. From 2011 to 2017, he served as the Director of Public Prosecutions for Northern Ireland.

== Early life and education ==
McGrory was born in 1959 in Belfast, Northern Ireland. He was one of four children and the only son of P.J. and Phyllis McGrory. His father was "one of Northern Ireland's best known criminal lawyers". He studied ancient history and Celtic studies at Queen's University Belfast, graduating with a Bachelor of Arts (BA) degree in 1983 (Ancient History and Celtic 2.2).

== Legal career ==
McGrory's legal career has been spent in criminal law. In 1987, he qualified as a solicitor. He served as Chairman of the Solicitors' Criminal Bar Association for 1990. In 2007, he was made a Queen's Counsel (QC); he was the first Northern Irish solicitor to be made a QC. In 2009, he was called to the bar, thereby becoming a barrister. During his private practice, he represented a wide range of clients, including Martin McGuinness, Gerry Adams, loyalist paramilitaries, Unionist politicians and former police officers.

In November 2011, McGrory was appointed the Director of Public Prosecutions for Northern Ireland (DPP). He is the first Roman Catholic to hold the post. On 17 May 2017, he announced that he would be stepping down as DPP when his term in office ends in September 2017.

McGrory has denied that his resignation is related to escalating allegations of bias by senior UK politicians and others, who have accused his office of prioritising prosecutions of former British soldiers for their actions during the Troubles. He was quoted as saying he regretted the legacy issue had become part of the story of his tenure and wished the mechanisms were in place to deal with the past and investigations into Troubles cases.

== Personal life ==
McGrory is a Roman Catholic. He is married to Brigid O'Neill, an ecologist and musician. They have two children.

Legal offices
Preceded by Sir Alasdair Fraser	Director of Public Prosecutions for Northern Ireland; 2011 to 2017	Succeeded by Stephen Herron
