= Alasdair Fraser (barrister) =

Sir Alasdair Fraser CB QC
- Born: Alasdair MacLeod Fraser; 29 September 1946; Glasgow, Scotland
- Died: 16 June 2012 (aged 65)
- Education: Trinity College, Dublin; Queen's University Belfast
- Occupation: Barrister
- Title: Director of Public Prosecutions for Northern Ireland
- Term: 1989 to 2010
- Predecessor: Sir Barry Shaw
- Successor: Barra McGrory
- Children: 3

Sir Alasdair MacLeod Fraser, CB, QC (29 September 1946 – 16 June 2012) was a Scottish-born Northern Irish lawyer. He served as Director of Public Prosecutions for Northern Ireland from 1989 to 2010.

== Early life ==
Fraser was born in Glasgow, Scotland on 29 September 1946. He and his family moved to Northern Ireland in 1950. He studied law at Trinity College, Dublin and undertook postgraduate studies at Queen's University Belfast.

== Legal career ==
Fraser was called to the Bar of Northern Ireland in 1970 beginning his career as a barrister. He practised law at a Belfast legal practice for three years.

In 1973, he joined the Department of the Director of Public Prosecutions. The following year, in 1974, he was promoted to Assistant Director of Public Prosecutions. In 1988, he was promoted to Deputy Director. In April 1989, he was appointed by Sir Patrick Mayhew, the Attorney General for Northern Ireland, as Director of Public Prosecutions for Northern Ireland. He served under six Attorney-Generals before retiring in September 2010.

== Later life ==
On 16 June 2012, Fraser died of cancer; he was aged 65. He had taken early retirement after his initial diagnosis. His funeral took place at St Mark's Church of Ireland in Dundela, Belfast on 20 June 2012.

== Personal life ==
Fraser was married to Margaret,Together they had three children; a daughter, Katy, and two sons, Andrew and Jamie.Andrew being the oldest. A rugby fan, he served as Chairman of the Church of Ireland's Young Men's Society rugby club based in Belfast.

== Honours ==
In the 1992 Queen's Birthday Honours, Fraser was appointed Companion of the Order of the Bath (CB) for his service as Director of Public Prosecutions for Northern Ireland. In the 2001 New Year Honours, he was made a Knight Bachelor 'for services to the Criminal Justice System'. He was knighted by Charles, Prince of Wales at Buckingham Palace on 2 March 2001. In 2006, he was awarded the Special Achievement Award by the International Association of Prosecutors for his role in prosecuting crimes in Northern Ireland during 30 years of The Troubles.

Legal offices
| Preceded by Sir Barry Shaw | Director of Public Prosecutions for Northern Ireland; 1989 to 2010 | Succeeded by Barra McGrory |
