= Independent International Commission on Decommissioning =

Northern Ireland arms decommissioning body

The Independent International Commission on Decommissioning (IICD) was established to oversee the decommissioning of paramilitary weapons in Northern Ireland, as part of the peace process.

== Legislation and organisation ==
An earlier international body, set up during the ceasefires to report on how decommissioning might be achieved, presented its report on 22 January 1996. This recommended that the decommissioning process should take place "to the satisfaction of an independent commission". The Decommissioning Act, 1997 in the Republic of Ireland and the Northern Ireland Arms Decommissioning Act 1997 in the United Kingdom enabled such a body, which was then set up in an agreement between the British and Irish governments on 26 August 1997.

The commission was composed of:

- General (Ret.) John de Chastelain, Chairman, from Canada
- Brigadier Tauno Nieminen, from Finland, and
- Ambassador Donald C. Johnson, from the US, 1997–99, Andrew D. Sens, from the US, 1999–2011

Its objective was to facilitate the decommissioning of firearms, ammunition and explosives, by:

- consulting with the two governments, the participants in the ongoing negotiations in Northern Ireland, and paramilitary and other relevant groups,
- devising and presenting to the governments a set of proposals on how to achieve decommissioning,
- facilitating the process by observing, monitoring and verifying decommissioning, and receiving and auditing arms, and
- reporting periodically on progress.

In the Good Friday Agreement, signed in 1998, the participants reaffirmed their commitment to the total disarmament of all paramilitary organisations, and confirmed their intention to continue to work constructively and in good faith with the Independent Commission, and to use any influence they may have, to achieve the decommissioning of all paramilitary arms within two years following endorsement in referendums North and South of the agreement and in the context of the implementation of the overall settlement.

In the event, progress on decommissioning was disappointingly slow, and the two-year target was not met. Decommissioning of Provisional Irish Republican Army (IRA) weaponry was often used as a necessary condition before Unionists would agree to the full implementation of the Agreement including power sharing. Negotiations between Republican representatives and the IICD were carried out eventually and these arms were put beyond use. Decommissioning of Loyalist arms started later but were also successfully concluded in 2010. See: The Final Report of the Independent International Commission on Decommissioning, 4 July 2011, which provides a summary history of the group and a statement of "lessons Learned" from the decommissioning process.

== Decommissioning of Republican paramilitary weaponry ==
In 2000, Martti Ahtisaari, former President of Finland, and Cyril Ramaphosa, South African political and business leader, were appointed to inspect IRA weapons dumps. They submitted three reports over the next year.

=== IRA weaponry ===
On 26 September 2005, the commission published its fourth and final report on acts of IRA decommissioning. The decommissioning process has taken place using estimates of IRA weaponry submitted by the British and Irish Governments. General John de Chastelain and his colleagues reported that they were "...satisfied that the arms decommissioned represent the totality of the IRA's arsenal". This was confirmed by two witnesses independent of the commission, Catholic priest Father Alec Reid, and former president of the Methodist Church in Ireland, Reverend Harold Good.

Among the weaponry estimated (by Jane's Intelligence Review) to have been destroyed as part of this entire process were:

- 1,000 rifles,
- 3 tonnes of Semtex,
- 20–30 heavy machine guns,
- 7 surface-to-air missiles (unused),
- 7 flame throwers,
- 1,200 detonators,
- 20 rocket-propelled grenade launchers,
- 100 handguns, and
- 100+ grenades.

There had been three previous acts of decommissioning by the IRA which were also overseen by the commission. The first act was in October 2001, the second in April 2002, the third in October 2003 and the fourth and final in September 2005. In the fourth and final act of decommissioning, General de Chastelain reported that he had seen rifles, particularly AK-47s, machine guns, surface-to-air missiles, explosives, explosive material, mortars, flame throwers, hand guns, timer units and blasting caps, and some weaponry that was "very old", including a WWII Bren light machine gun.

The panel stated to the press:

"We have observed and verified events to put beyond use very large quantities of arms which we believe include all the arms in the IRA's possession... Our new inventory is consistent with these estimates. We are satisfied that the arms decommissioning represents the totality of the IRA's arsenal."

and while they could not report on the quantity or types of weapons destroyed the witnesses said:

"The experience of seeing this with our own eyes, on a minute-to-minute basis, provided us with evidence so clear and of its nature so incontrovertible that at the end of the process [IRA weapon decommissioning] it demonstrated to us – and would have demonstrated to anyone who might have been with us – that beyond any shadow of doubt, the arms of the IRA have now been decommissioned."

The 10th (latest as of May 2006) report from the IMC stated that it believes that the IRA completed the process of decommissioning all the weapons "under its control" during the final act of decommissioning in 2005.

=== Other republican weaponry ===
In February 2010, days before the IICD was due to disband, both the Irish National Liberation Army and the Official Irish Republican Army announced that they had decommissioned their weapons.

== Decommissioning of Loyalist paramilitary weaponry ==
The Loyalist Volunteer Force (LVF) decommissioned small arms and ammunition in December 1998. The three main loyalist paramilitary groups, the Ulster Volunteer Force (UVF), Red Hand Commando (RHC) and the Ulster Defence Association (UDA), retained their weapons for a longer period during which their members were said by the Independent Monitoring Commission to still be engaged in criminal activities. On 12 February 2006, The Observer reported that the UVF had refused to decommission its weapons; the UVF formally decommissioned their weapons in June 2009. The UDA was confirmed to have decommissioned its weapons on 6 January 2010. The UDA's decommissioning was confirmed by General de Chastelain, Lord Eames, the former archbishop of Armagh and Sir George Quigley, a former top civil servant. De Chastelain stated that the decommissioning included arms, ammunition, explosives and explosive devices and the UDA stated that the arms "constitute the totality of those under their control". The dissident UDA South East Antrim Brigade completed decommissioning by February 2010.
