= Decommissioning in Northern Ireland =

Agreed decommissioning of weapons

Decommissioning in Northern Ireland was a process in the Belfast Agreement as part of the Northern Ireland peace process. Under the Good Friday Agreement/Belfast Agreement, all paramilitary groups fighting in the Troubles would be subject to decommission. Decommissioning was a defining issue in the effort to negotiate peace in Northern Ireland.

== Background ==
During The Troubles, both republican and loyalist paramilitary groups sourced vast amounts of arms and ammunition for use in their campaigns. The Provisional Irish Republican Army initially sourced many of their weapons from the USA, eventually obtaining many Armalite AR-15 rifles along with batches of military grade arms such as M60 machine guns and Barrett M82 sniper rifles. In the mid-1980's Muammar Gaddafi gifted the IRA over 130 tonnes of military weapons, which included an estimated 1,000 AKM assault rifles along with more than a metric ton of Semtex plastic explosives, several SA-7 Grail infrared-homing missiles and dozens of DShK heavy machine guns. By the time of the July 1997 ceasefire, Irish security forces estimated the IRA to have over 350 tonnes of weapons under their control. The Ulster Volunteer Force obtained hundreds of military grade weapons such as MAC-10s, Uzis, and Colt Commando carbines in the early 1980s via supporters in Canada, while a joint operation involving the Ulster Resistance and the Ulster Defence Association resulted in hundreds of VZ58 assault rifles and thousands of rounds of ammunition being smuggled into Belfast from the Middle East in December 1987.

== Belfast Agreement/Good Friday Agreement ==
The Belfast Agreement, or Good Friday Agreement, was signed in Belfast on 10 April 1998 (Good Friday) by the British and Irish governments and endorsed by most Northern Ireland political parties.

It contained provisions for a government involving both Catholics and Protestants, whose traditional aspirations, expressed as nationalism on one side and unionism on the other, had often clashed over the years. The Agreement recognised the legitimacy of both aspirations. One of the provisions of the Agreement was that the parties agree to collectively use their influence to achieve decommissioning within two years, by May 2000.

== Independent International Commission on Decommissioning ==
The Independent International Commission on Decommissioning (IICD) was established to oversee the decommissioning. Its objective was to facilitate the decommissioning of firearms, ammunition and explosives.

== Decommissioning problems ==
Into late 2001, the Provisional Irish Republican Army (IRA) was reluctant to disarm, and went on to refuse disarmament, saying that the British government had reneged on its side of the bargain, specifically:

- by watering down the reforms of the Royal Ulster Constabulary proposed by the Patten Commission, and
- by failing to pull troops out of Northern Ireland.

After the original (May 2000) deadline for decommissioning passed, the Independent International Commission on Decommissioning set 30 June 2001; that date passed, as well, without full disarmament.

The crisis reached its climax in July 2001, as David Trimble, the Ulster Unionist Party leader, resigned as first minister of the power-sharing Northern Ireland Executive, in protest against the IRA's failure to redeem its pledge to put its weapons "completely and verifiably beyond use". (He would later be re-elected.) The peace process was on the brink of collapse again, after the Provisional IRA failed to convince either the UK Government, or the Ulster Unionists, that they had made "sufficient progress towards decommissioning".

== Breakthrough ==
On 7 August 2001, the IRA agreed on a method of destroying its arsenal. Tony Blair, Prime Minister of the United Kingdom at the time, described the breakthrough as "significant" and "historic". General John de Chastelain of Canada, chairman of the Independent International Commission on Decommissioning, said the proposals had been accepted by the panel as ones that would "put IRA arms completely and verifiably beyond use." The Ulster Unionists had said they would no longer take part in the Northern Ireland Assembly if the IRA did not begin disarming. The announcement came after meetings between the commission and a representative of the IRA.

During the process of decommissioning the Democratic Unionist Party demanded that the IRA release photographs of the decommissioning process in order to satisfy the unionist "man in the street". The IRA rejected these claims, claiming it would amount to "humiliation", and that two clergymen would oversee the process instead. On 26 September 2005, head of the International Commission on Decommissioning General John De Chastelain announced that the IRA had finally completed the decommissioning of all arms and ammunition under its control, adding that the bulk of the work had taken place over the previous week and had finished two days previously.

In June 2009, both the Ulster Volunteer Force and Red Hand Commando announced that they had completed a process of decommissioning. The UDA said it had started a process that would lead to the destruction of all its arms. Originally, both organisations had refused to decommission, claiming that copying the IRA's action would amount to "dancing to their tune".

== Timeline ==
- 10 April 1998 (Good Friday): Belfast Agreement is signed, which agrees to have all paramilitary groups in Northern Ireland decommission by May 2000.
- 8 August 1998: Loyalist paramilitary group the Loyalist Volunteer Force announce they are ending their armed campaign
- mid-December 1998: The LVF becomes the first paramilitary group to decommission some of its arms, after four submachine guns, two rifles, two pistols, a sawn-off shotgun and several pipe bombs are handed over for disposal
- 9 August 1999: Republican paramilitary group the Irish National Liberation Army announce they are ending their armed campaign
- May 2000: Deadline to disarm passes. Independent International Commission on Decommissioning agrees on a new deadline, 30 June 2001.
- early-June 2000: Inspectors from the IICD are granted access to one of the main arms dumps of the Provisional Irish Republican Army for the first time
- late-June 2000: IICD representatives Martti Ahtisaari and Cyril Ramaphosa inspect three major IRA arms dumps in the Irish Republic and then witness their entrances being closed up with tamper proof seals
- late-October 2000: IICD representatives Martti Ahtisaari and Cyril Ramaphosa confirm that tamper proof seals remain intact on the three major IRA arms dumps they had previously inspected
- 30 June 2001: Second deadline to disarm passes
- late-May 2001: IICD representatives Martti Ahtisaari and Cyril Ramaphosa confirm that tamper proof seals remain intact on the three major IRA arms dumps they had previously inspected
- July 2001: Ulster Unionist leader David Trimble resigns as First Minister because the Provisional Irish Republican Army (IRA) refuses to disarm.
- early-August 2001: The IRA agrees with the IICD on a method to decommission its weapons and put them "beyond use"
- October 2001: The IRA carries out its first decommissioning of weapons, with IICD monitors witnessing arms, ammunition and explosives being put beyond use
- April 2002: The IRA decommissions another quantity of weapons, with IICD inspectors witnessing a substantial quantity of ammunition, arms and explosive material being put beyond use
- October 2003: The IRA carries out a major act of arms decommissioning in the presence of IICD monitors, with Irish authorities estimating that over 100 tonnes of weapons were put beyond use over a 20 hour time period. According to Irish police sources, the latest destruction of arms, which included heavy machine guns and shoulder launched surface-to-air missiles supplied from Libya, meant that over 30% of the IRA's entire arsenal had now been put beyond use
- 28 July 2005: The IRA announces its leadership has "formally ordered an end to the armed campaign", adding that all active service units have been ordered to dump arms
- late-July 2005: The IRA begins several decommissioning actions in Northern Ireland and the Republic of Ireland over the course of several months
- mid-September 2005: The IRA begins its final major act of arms decommissioning over a 7 day time period
- 24 September 2005: The IRA completes the decommissioning of all arms and ammunition under its control
- 3 May 2007: Loyalist paramilitary groups the Ulster Volunteer Force and the Red Hand Commando announce they are ending their armed campaigns, adding that both organizations would now "assume a non-military, civilianized role"
- 12 November 2007: Loyalist paramilitary group the Ulster Defence Association announces that it is standing down the 'Ulster Freedom Fighters', adding that they believed "the war is over"
- 27 June 2009: The UVF and the RHC both announce they have completed the decommissioning of all arms and ammunition. On the same day, the UDA announces they have begun engaging with the IICD to start the decommissioning of their own weapons.
- early-January 2010: The UDA completes the decommissioning of its entire cache of arms and ammunition after UDA leader Jackie McDonald supervised the delivery of a truck load of arms to Ballykinler Barracks, where IICD officials then used an electric saw to cut up the firearms and British Army EOD officers detonated the explosives
- early-February 2010: The INLA completes the decommissioning of its entire cache of arms and ammunition

== See also ==
- Colombian peace process
