= Mountjoy Prison helicopter escape =

1973 escape of three Provisional IRA volunteers from a prison in Dublin, Ireland

Coordinates: 53°21′42″N 06°16′03″W

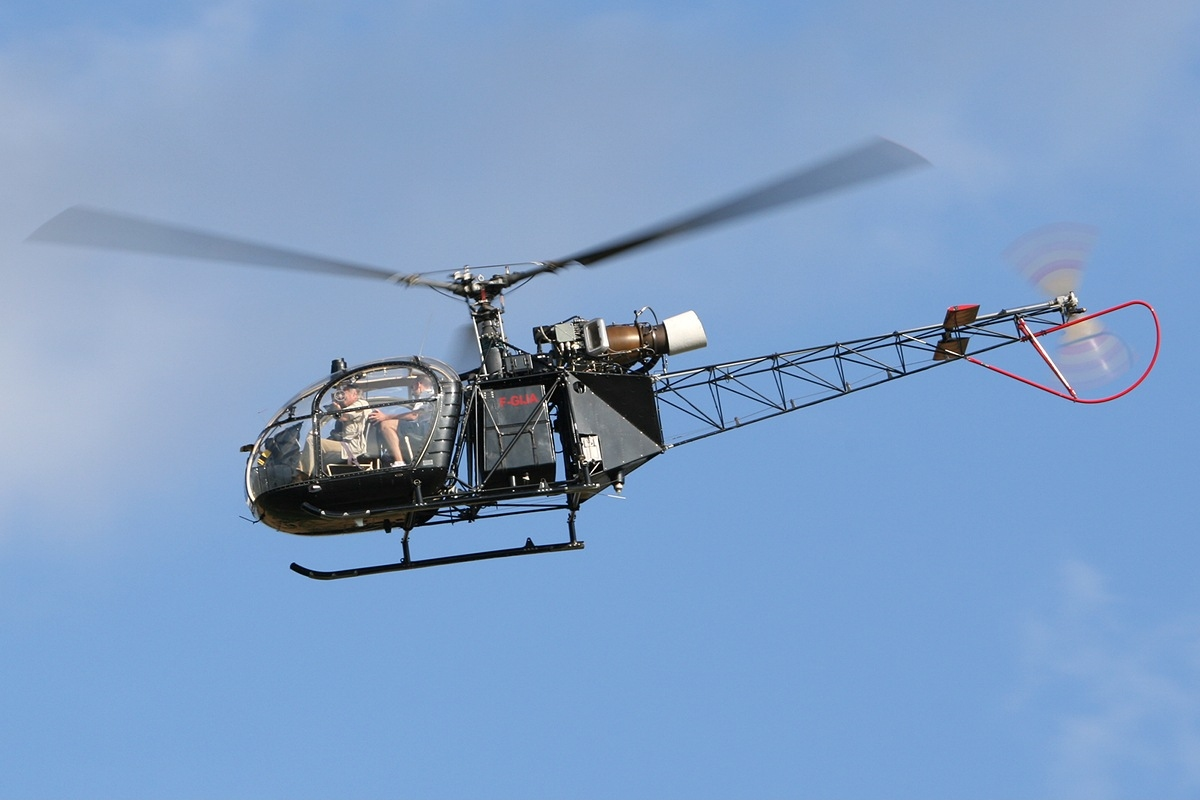
An Aérospatiale Alouette II, the type of helicopter used in the escape

The Mountjoy Prison helicopter escape occurred on 31 October 1973 when three Provisional Irish Republican Army (IRA) volunteers escaped from Mountjoy Prison in Dublin, Ireland, by boarding a hijacked helicopter that briefly landed in the prison's exercise yard. The escape made headlines around the world and was an embarrassment to the Irish coalition government of the time, led by Fine Gael's Liam Cosgrave, which was criticised by opposition party Fianna Fáil. A manhunt involving twenty thousand members of the Irish Defence Forces and Garda Síochána was launched for the escapees, one of whom, Seamus Twomey, was not recaptured until December 1977.

== Background ==
Following the outbreak of the Troubles in the late 1960s, the IRA had conducted an armed campaign that sought to create a united Ireland by ending Northern Ireland's status as part of the United Kingdom. As a result of increasing levels of violence in Northern Ireland, internment without trial was introduced there in August 1971, and in the Republic of Ireland the coalition government led by Fine Gael's Liam Cosgrave was attempting to curb IRA activity. Fine Gael had come to power on a law and order ticket, with a policy of "getting tough on crime". Suspected IRA members were arrested and accused of IRA membership by a superintendent in the Garda Síochána, a crime under the Offences against the State Act. They were tried at the juryless Special Criminal Court in Dublin, where the traditional IRA policy of not recognising the court resulted in a fait accompli as no defence was offered and IRA membership carried a minimum mandatory one-year sentence, resulting in internment in all but name. In September 1973 IRA Chief of Staff Seamus Twomey appeared at the Special Criminal Court charged with IRA membership and stated: "I refuse to recognise this British-orientated quisling court". He was found guilty and received a five-year sentence. By October 1973 the IRA's command structure was seriously curbed, with Twomey and other senior republicans J. B. O'Hagan and Kevin Mallon all being held in Mountjoy Prison.

== Plan ==
The IRA immediately began making plans to break Twomey, O'Hagan and Mallon out of the prison. The first attempt involved explosives that had been smuggled into the prison, which were to be used to blow a hole in a door which would give the prisoners access to the exercise yard. From there, they would scale a rope ladder thrown over the exterior wall by members of the IRA's Dublin Brigade who would have a getaway car waiting to complete the escape. The plan failed when the prisoners could not gain access to the exercise yard and the rope ladder was spotted, so the IRA began making new escape plans. The idea of using a helicopter in an escape had been discussed before, an idea to break Gerry Adams out of Long Kesh internment camp had been ruled out because of faster and more sophisticated British Army helicopters being stationed at a nearby base. The IRA's GHQ staff approved the plan to break out Twomey, O'Hagan and Mallon, and arrangements were made to obtain a helicopter. A man with an American accent calling himself Mr. Leonard approached the manager of Irish Helicopters at Dublin Airport, with a view to hiring a helicopter for an aerial photographic shoot in County Laois. After being shown the company's fleet of helicopters, Leonard arranged to hire a five-seater Alouette II for 31 October.

== Escape ==
Leonard arrived at Irish Helicopters on 31 October and was introduced to the pilot of the helicopter, Captain Thompson Boyes. Boyes was instructed to fly to a field in Stradbally, in order to pick up Leonard's photographic equipment. After landing Boyes saw two armed, masked men approaching the helicopter from nearby trees. Boyes was held at gunpoint and told he would not be harmed if he followed instructions. Leonard left with one gunman while the other, armed with a pistol and an Armalite rifle, climbed aboard the helicopter. Boyes was instructed to fly towards Dublin following the path of railway lines and the Royal Canal, and was ordered not to register his flight path with Air Traffic Control. As the helicopter approached Dublin, Boyes was informed of the escape plan and instructed to land in the exercise yard at Mountjoy Prison where the prisoners were watching a football match.

Shortly after 3:35 pm the helicopter swung in to land in the prison yard, with Kevin Mallon directing the pilot using semaphore. A prison officer on duty initially took no action as he believed the helicopter contained the Minister for Defence, Paddy Donegan. After prisoners surrounded the eight prison officers in the yard, fights broke out as it was realised that an escape attempt was in progress. As other prisoners restrained the officers, Twomey, Mallon and O'Hagan boarded the helicopter which took off. In the confusion one officer shouted "Close the gates, close the fucking gates". The helicopter flew north and landed at a disused racecourse in the Baldoyle area of Dublin, where the escapees were met by members of the IRA's Dublin Brigade. Boyes was released unharmed, and the escapees were transferred to a taxi that had been hijacked earlier and transported to safe houses.

== Reaction ==
The escape made headlines around the world and was an embarrassment for Cosgrave's government, which was criticised for "incompetence in security matters" by opposition party Fianna Fáil. An emergency debate on security was held in Dáil Éireann on 1 November, where leader of the opposition Jack Lynch stated:

It is poetic justice that a helicopter is now at the heart of the Government's embarrassment and in the centre of their dilemma. Indeed, it was hard to blame the prison officer who observed that he thought it was the Minister for Defence paying an informal visit to Mountjoy Prison yesterday because, of course, we all know the Minister for Defence is wont to use helicopters, as somebody observed already, as other Ministers are wont to use State cars.

The IRA released a statement on the escape, which read, "Three republican prisoners were rescued by a special unit from Mountjoy Prison on Wednesday. The operation was a complete success and the men are now safe, despite a massive hunt by Free State forces". Shortly after the escape Twomey gave an exclusive interview to German magazine Der Spiegel, where the reporter said people throughout Europe were joking about the incident as "the escape of the century". Irish rebel band the Wolfe Tones wrote a song celebrating the escape called "The Helicopter Song", which was immediately banned by the government yet still topped the Irish popular music charts after selling twelve thousand copies in a single week.

== Aftermath ==
The escape resulted in all IRA prisoners being held at Mountjoy Prison and Curragh Camp being transferred to the maximum security Portlaoise Prison. The perimeter of the prison was guarded by members of the Irish Army and wires were erected over the prison yard to prevent any future helicopter escape. Cosgrave stated there would be "no hiding place" for the escapees, and a manhunt involving twenty thousand members of the Irish Defence Forces and Garda Síochána ensued. Mallon was recaptured at a Gaelic Athletic Association dance in a hotel near Portlaoise on 10 December 1973 and imprisoned in Portlaoise Prison. He escaped from there in a mass break-out on 18 August 1974, when nineteen prisoners escaped after overpowering guards and using gelignite to blast through the gates. He was recaptured in Foxrock in January 1975 and returned to Portlaoise Prison. O'Hagan was recaptured in Dublin in early 1975 and imprisoned in Portlaoise Prison. After the end of his original twelve-month sentence, he was immediately arrested and sentenced to a further two years imprisonment for escaping. Twomey evaded recapture until 2 December 1977, when he was spotted sitting in a car in Sandycove by members of the Garda's Special Branch who were investigating an arms shipment after a tip-off from police in Belgium. He drove away after spotting the officers, before being recaptured in the centre of Dublin after a high-speed car chase. He was also imprisoned in Portlaoise Prison until his release in 1982.

== See also ==
- List of helicopter prison escapes
- Maze Prison escape
- Timeline of Provisional Irish Republican Army actions
