= Tom McGuinness (Gaelic footballer) =

Derry Gaelic footballer

Thomas McGuinness
Personal information
- Native name: Tomás Mag Aonghusa (Irish)
- Nickname: Tom
- Born: Derry, Northern Ireland
- Occupation: Bricklayer tutor

Sport
- Sport: Gaelic football
- Position: Midfield
Clubs
- Years: Club
- 1968–1972 1972–1973 1976–1980: Sarsfield's; Newbridge; Steelstown
Club titles
- Derry titles: ?
Inter-county**
Years	County	Apps (scores)
1968–1980	Derry	31 (0–27)
Inter-county titles
- Ulster titles: 3
- **Inter County team apps and scores correct as of 19:38, 5 August 2009 (UTC).

Tom McGuinness is a former Gaelic footballer who played for the Derry county team between 1968 and 1980. He won three Ulster Senior Football Championships with the county, as well as the Ulster Under 21 and All-Ireland Under-21 Football Championships.

McGuinness started his club career with Sarsfield's in his native Derry City. He later played for Sean O'Leary's Newbridge winning Derry Senior Football Championship medals with the club. McGuinness finished his club career at Steelstown.

He usually played in midfield. He was shorter than most midfielders, but made up for this with his excellent spring and catching abilities, which drew McGuinness comparisons with Jim McKeever. Along with his ability to out-jump bigger opponents was his capability to score long-range points and his free-running play was described as a "nightmare for defenders".

McGuinness is known as one of Derry's best ever players. Along with Mickey McNaught, he has been described as one of the two best ever players to come from Derry City.

== Personal life ==
McGuinness was born in Derry City on 15 May 1949, to Peggy and William McGuinness, and grew up just 50 yards from Celtic Park. He was educated at the Christian Brothers School in the city. McGuinness had one sister, Geraldine, and five brothers: John, William, Paul, Declan and Martin, the latter being a prominent Sinn Féin politician and former Deputy First Minister of Northern Ireland.

== Playing career ==
=== Club ===
McGuinness started his club career with Sarsfield's in Derry City. He later played for Sean O'Leary's Newbridge. He had much success with the club, winning the Derry Senior Football Championship on ? occasions. When the Steelstown club started up in Derry City he made a playing comeback, lending his experience to the younger players. He also was manager of Steelstown for a period.

=== Inter-county ===
McGuinness first came to prominence as part of the Derry Under-21 side that won both the Ulster Under-21 and All-Ireland Under-21 Football Championships in 1968. He played in midfield alongside Seamus Lagan. Having reached the Ulster Under-21 final, they beat Monaghan. In the All-Ireland semi-final Derry defeated a fancied Kerry team with ease. In the All-Ireland final Derry met Offaly in Croke Park and won 3–09 to 1–09. The success was Derry's first ever All-Ireland Under-21 title.

That same year McGuinness made his debut for the Derry Senior team on 9 June 1968 against Down. He soon established himself on the Senior team and became a long-time midfield partner of Larry Diamond. In 1970 McGuinness helped Derry win the Ulster Senior Football Championship, overcoming Antrim in the final. Derry met Kerry in the All-Ireland semi-final, but were defeated.

In 1975 McGuinness and Derry again won the Ulster Championship, this time with victory over Down. They were however beaten by Dublin in the subsequent All-Ireland semi-final. They defended their Ulster title in 1976, beating Cavan in the final after a replay. Once again Derry lost in the All-Ireland semi-final, this time to Kerry.

McGuinness made his last Derry appearance on 8 June 1980 against Down – a day less than 12 years since his debut.

=== Finn Harps ===
McGuinness played in the 1970s for Finn Harps alongside his brother, Paul and Brendan Bradley.

== Honours ==
=== Inter-county ===
- Ulster Senior Football Championship:
  - Winner (3): 1970, 1975, 1976
  - Runner up: 1971, 1977
- All-Ireland Under-21 Football Championship:
  - Winner (1): 1968
