= Seamus Twomey =

Irish republican militant (1919–1989)

- Séamus Ó Tuama
- Photograph of Twomey taken in 1972 during an IRA Press Conference
- Born: 5 November 1919; Lower Falls, Belfast, Ireland
- Died: 12 September 1989 (aged 69); Mater Hospital, Dublin, Ireland
- Burial place: Milltown Cemetery
- Spouse: Rosie McCotter
- Military career
- Allegiance: Irish Republic
- Branch: Fianna Éireann (1936–1937) Irish Republican Army (1937–1969) Provisional IRA (1969–late 1980s)
- Rank: Volunteer (1937–early 1970s) Officer Commanding (early 1970s–1973) Chief of Staff (1973; 1974–1977)
- Nickname: Thumper
- Unit: Belfast Brigade
- Conflicts: The Troubles

Seamus Twomey (Irish: Séamus Ó Tuama; 5 November 1919 – 12 September 1989) was an Irish republican activist, militant, and twice chief of staff of the Provisional IRA.

== Biography ==
Born in Belfast on Marchioness Street in the historic Pound Loney district of the Lower Falls. Twomey lived at 6 Sevastopol Street in the Clonard area, also in the Lower Falls. Known as "Thumper" owing to his short temper and habit of banging his fist on tables, he received little education and was a bookmaker's (bookie's) 'runner'. Seamus's father was a volunteer in the 1920s. In Belfast he lived comfortably with his wife, Rosie, whom he married in 1946. Together they had sons and daughters.

== IRA ==
He began his involvement with the militant youth organisation, Fianna Éireann, in 1936 before joining the Irish Republican Army in 1937. He was interned in Northern Ireland during the 1940s on the prison ship Al Rawdah and later in Crumlin Road Gaol in Belfast. Rosie McCotter, his wife, was also held prisoner at the women prison, Armagh Jail. He opposed the left-wing shift of Cathal Goulding in the 1960s, and in 1968, helped set up the breakaway Andersonstown Republican Club (later the Roddy McCorley Society).

In 1969, he was prominent in the establishment of the Provisional IRA. By 1972, he was Officer Commanding of the Provisional IRA's Belfast Brigade when it launched its bombing campaign of the city, including Bloody Friday when nine people were killed. During the 1970s, the leadership of the Belfast Brigade of the IRA was largely in the hands of Twomey, Billy McKee and Ivor Bell.

In March 1973, Twomey was first appointed IRA Chief of Staff after the arrest of Joe Cahill. On 1 September 1973, Twomey was arrested by the Garda Síochána in a farmhouse near Carrickmacross and was replaced after his conviction in an October trial. Three weeks later, on 31 October 1973, the IRA organised the helicopter escape of Twomey and his fellow IRA members J.B. O'Hagan and Kevin Mallon, when an active service unit hijacked and forced the pilot at gun-point to land the helicopter in the training yard of Mountjoy Prison. After his escape, he returned to his membership of IRA's Army Council.

By June/July 1974, Twomey was IRA Chief of Staff for a second time. He took part in the Feakle talks between the IRA and Protestant clergymen in December 1974. In the IRA truce which followed in 1975, Twomey was largely unsupportive and wanted to fight on in what he saw as "one big push to finish it once and for all".

IRA informer Sean O'Callaghan alleged that in January 1976, Twomey and Brian Keenan gave the go-ahead for the sectarian Kingsmill massacre, when 10 unarmed Ulster Protestant workmen were executed by the Provisional IRA in retaliation for a rash of loyalist killings of Catholics in the area. O'Callaghan alleged it was Keenan's view that "The only way to knock the nonsense out of the Prods is to be 10 times more savage".

Twomey was dedicated to paramilitarism as a means of incorporating Northern Ireland into the Republic of Ireland. In an interview with French television on 11 July 1977, he declared that although the IRA had waged a campaign for seven years at that point, it could fight on for another 70 against the British state in Northern Ireland and in England. Twomey supported the bombing of wealthy civilian targets, which he justified on class lines. On 29 October 1977, for example, a no-warning bomb at an Italian restaurant in Mayfair killed one diner and wounded 17 others. Three more people were killed in similar blasts in Chelsea and Mayfair the following month. Twomey said: "By hitting Mayfair restaurants, we were hitting the type of person that could bring pressure to bear on the British government".

== Capture ==
In December 1977, he was captured in Sandycove, Dublin by the Garda Síochána, who had been tipped off by Belgian police about a concealed arms shipment, to be delivered to a bogus company with an address in the area. They swooped on a house in Martello Terrace to discover Twomey outside in his car, wearing his trademark dark glasses. After a high-speed pursuit, he was recaptured in the centre of Dublin. The Gardaí later found documents in his possession outlining proposals for the structural reorganisation of the IRA according to the clandestine cell system. Twomey's arrest ended his tenure as IRA chief of staff as he was imprisoned in Portlaoise Prison until 1982. In the 1986 split over abstentionism, Twomey sided with the Gerry Adams leadership and remained with the Provisionals.

== Death ==
After a long illness from a heart condition, Twomey died in Mater Hospital in Dublin on 12 September 1989. He was buried in the family plot in Milltown Cemetery, Belfast. His funeral was attended by about 2,000 people.

== Quotations ==
- "I have most of my life been brought up in a Republican tradition ... However, I grew up in a situation of such degradation and unemployment and humiliation that the life our people lived was just no life at all. I said to myself that when I grow up and get married I will want for my children something better than this."
- "Our first prime and main objective is the unification of our country. This means getting the British out of the occupied part of the country. After that the whole system in North and South would have to be changed"
- "We draw a distinction between Irish Nationalism and republicanism. A 'nationalist' as such can work for the benefit of his country by doing all in his power to promote industry and help people etc. Our definition implies the militant republican tradition. Our use of the term 'nationalism' means first of all getting the freedom of our country and then starting to better the welfare of the people".
- "Freedom does not mean simply the freedom of green fields: it means that every person is catered for so that every family in the country would be able to live free from poverty and unemployment".
