= Barry Shaw (footballer) =

English footballer

Personal information
- Full name: Barry Shaw
- Date of birth: 31 October 1948
- Place of birth: Chilton, County Durham, England
- Position: Left winger

Senior career*
Years	Team	Apps	(Gls)
19??–1968	Crowborough Athletic		
1968	Darlington	2	(0)
- * Club domestic league appearances and goals

Barry Shaw (born 31 October 1948) is an English former amateur footballer who played as a left winger in the Football League for Darlington, whom he joined from non-league club Crowborough Athletic. Shaw made two senior appearances for Darlington, both in the Fourth Division as a stand-in for regular winger Harry Kirk. His debut came on 20 April 1968, in a 2–0 home win against Rochdale, and he kept his place for the next match before Kirk returned to the side.
