= Director of Public Prosecutions for Northern Ireland =

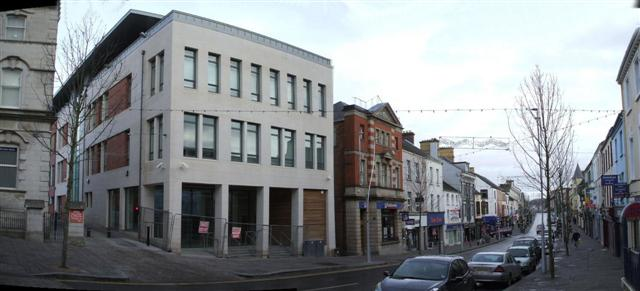
DPP offices in Omagh

The Director of Public Prosecutions (DPP) is the head of the Public Prosecution Service of Northern Ireland, and is appointed by the Attorney General for Northern Ireland. The position of DPP was established in 1972. The current DPP is Stephen Herron who was appointed in 2017. He replaced Barra McGrory QC.

== List of Directors of Public Prosecutions for Northern Ireland ==
- 1972 to 1989: Sir Barry Shaw
- 1989 to 2010: Sir Alasdair Fraser
- 2011 to 2017: Barra McGrory
- 2017 to present: Stephen Herron

== See also ==
- Director of Public Prosecutions
- Director of Public Prosecutions (England and Wales)
- Advocate General for Northern Ireland
