= Joe B. O'Hagan =

Provisional IRA member (1922-2001)

Joe B. O'Hagan, a.k.a. J.B. O'Hagan (4 May 1922 – 23 April 2001) was a Provisional IRA member.

A native of Lurgan, County Armagh, Joe O'Hagan was an active member of the Irish Republican Army (IRA). For many years O'Hagan was a leader of the Irish Republican Movement in north Armagh. He joined the IRA in 1940 and participated in several IRA campaigns over the next five decades. O'Hagan was active in IRA training camps and was arrested in the early 1940s and imprisoned in Crumlin Road Jail and Derry Gaol. In the 1950s Joe O'Hagan participated in the IRAs Border Campaign and was interned in Curragh Camp. In 1957 he was involved in the bombing of the British Territorial Army base in Dungannon, County Tyrone. After that attack O'Hagan went "on the run" and was captured and again imprisoned in Derry Gaol.

A founder of the Provisional IRA, he served on its Army Council till imprisoned in the Republic of Ireland. On 31 October 1973 he and other IRA members including Kevin Mallon, Seamus Twomey, escaped from Mountjoy Prison, Dublin in the "spectactular" Mountjoy Prison helicopter escape. On 20 December 1974 O'Hagan was part of an IRA leadership group which met with a group of Protestant clergymen from the Irish Council of Churches. The two groups met in the small town of Feakle, County Clare with a goal of opening dialog and the cessation of violence. In addition to O'Hagan some of the IRA leaders present were: Ruairí Ó Brádaigh, Billy McKee, Dáithí Ó Conaill and IRA Chief of Staff Seamus Twomey. The Protestant attendees represented the Irish and British Councils of Churches and several major Churches in Ireland including the Church of Ireland Bishop Dr. Arthur Butler. The meeting ended before any definite results could be attained as the attendees were warned that the Irish police were about to conduct a raid. In January 1975 O'Hagan was recaptured and this time imprisoned in Portlaoise Prison.

He died in 2001 and was eulogised by Sinn Féin's Gerry Adams and Caoimhghín Ó Caoláin as "a republican legend ... Whether as soldier, prisoner, political activist, husband, father or friend, JB gave his fullest. He was an inspiration to younger generations of republicans and those of us who were privileged to know him well will mourn his passing deeply. I measc laochra na nGael a raibh sé." (translation: He was among the heroes of the Irish).

He was a relative of journalist Martin O'Hagan who was murdered in Lurgan the same year.
