= Loyalist Volunteer Force =

Former Ulster loyalist paramilitary group

Loyalist Volunteer Force (LVF)
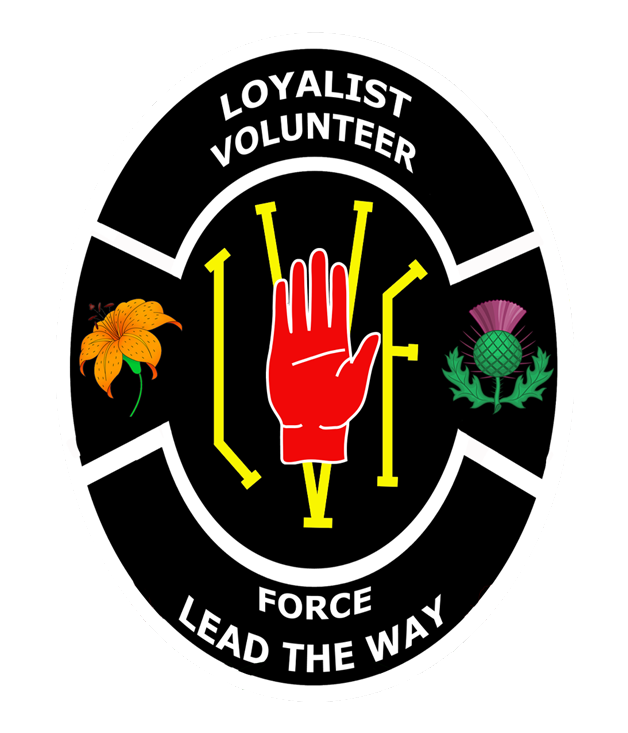
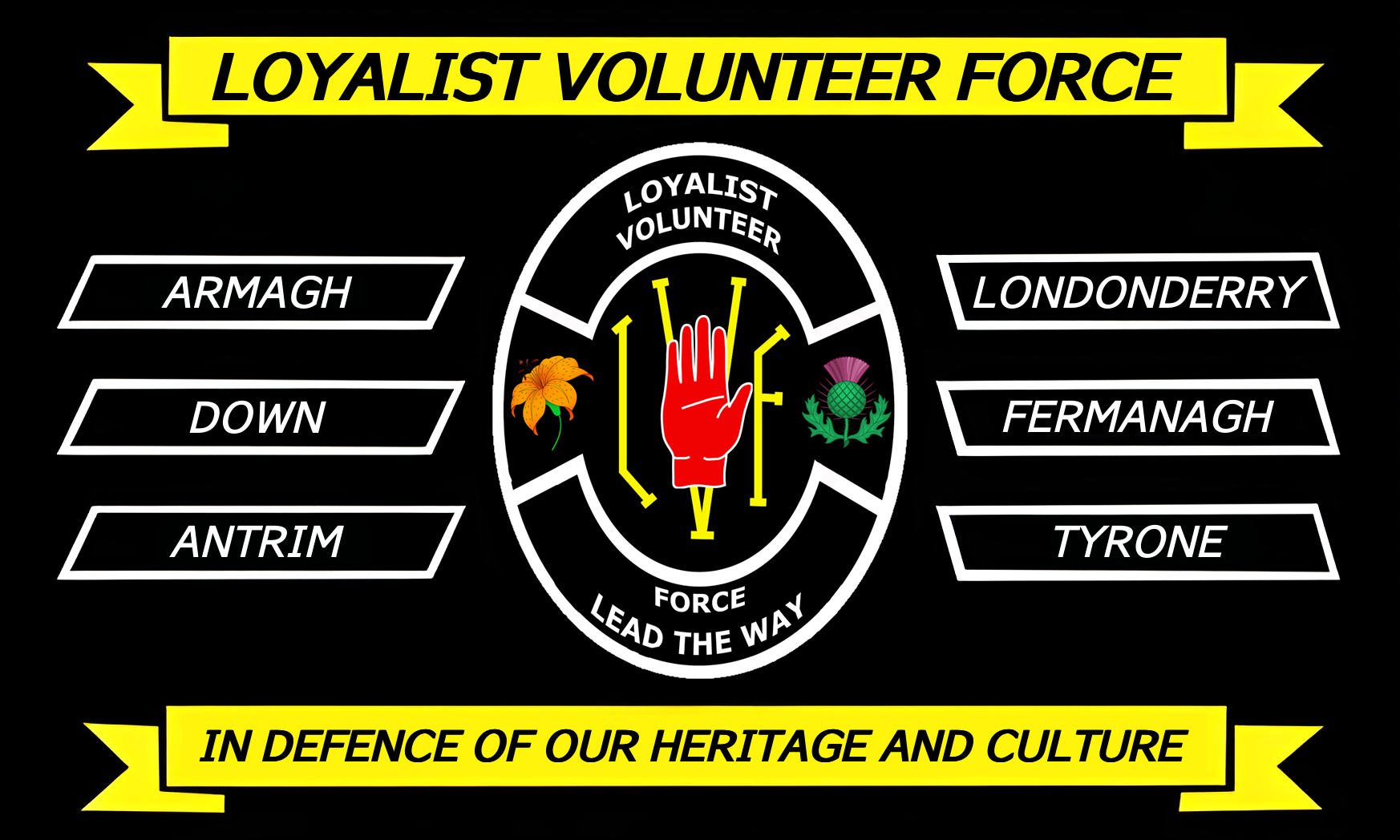
- Above: Emblem of the LVF; Below: Flag used by the LVF.
- Leaders: Billy Wright; Mark Fulton; Robin King; Jim Fulton
- Dates active: August 1996 – October 2005 (under ceasefire since May 1998)
- Split from: Ulster Volunteer Force
- Groups: Young Loyalist Volunteers (youth wing); Red Hand Defenders (cover name)
- Headquarters: Portadown
- Active regions: Northern Ireland; Republic of Ireland
- Ideology: Ulster loyalism Protestant extremism Anti-Catholicism; Irish Unionism
- Size: Unknown
- Wars: The Troubles

The Loyalist Volunteer Force (LVF) was an Ulster loyalist paramilitary group in Northern Ireland. It was formed by Billy Wright in 1996 when he and his unit split from the Ulster Volunteer Force (UVF) after breaking its ceasefire. Most of its members came from the UVF's Mid-Ulster Brigade, which Wright had previously commanded.

In a two-year period from August 1996, the LVF waged a paramilitary campaign in opposition to Irish republicanism and the Northern Ireland peace process. During this time it killed at least 14 people in gun and bomb attacks, almost all of them Catholic civilians killed at random. The LVF called off its campaign in August 1998 and decommissioned some of its weapons, but in the early 2000s a loyalist feud led to several killings.

Since then, the LVF has been largely inactive, but its members are believed to have been involved in rioting and organized crime. In 2015, the security forces stated that the LVF "exists only as a criminal group" in Mid-Ulster and Antrim.

The LVF is designated a terrorist group by the United Kingdom and United States.

== Goals ==
In a document, the LVF outlined its goals as follows:

- The use of the Ulster conflict as a crucible for far-reaching, fundamental and decisive change in the United Kingdom constitution.
- To restore Ulster's right to self-determination.
- To end Irish nationalist aggression against Ulster in whatever form.
- To end all forms of Irish interference in Ulster's internal affairs.
- To thwart the creation and/or implementation of any All-Ireland/All-Island political super-structure regardless of the powers vested in such institutions.
- To defeat the campaign of de-Britishisation and Gaelicisation of Ulster's daily life.

There is also a Christian fundamentalist element within the LVF.

Its leader, Billy Wright, was a born again Christian and former preacher. Professor Peter Shirlow, of Queen's University Belfast, noted that many LVF members believed that Irish nationalism/republicanism and Catholicism were interlinked. They believed that Ulster Protestants were a persecuted people and Ulster was their "God-given land", which must be defended from these "dark and satanic forces".

The LVF published a magazine called Leading the Way.

== History ==
=== Early days ===
Billy Wright was the leader of the Mid-Ulster Brigade of the Ulster Volunteer Force (UVF), having taken over the command from Robin "the Jackal" Jackson in the early 1990s upon the latter's retirement. In October 1994, the UVF and other loyalist paramilitary groups called a ceasefire with Irish Republican groups.

Internal differences between Wright and the UVF's Brigade Staff in Belfast came to a head in July 1996, during the Drumcree parade dispute. The Orange Order was being stopped from marching through the Catholic Garvaghy area of Portadown. There was a standoff at Drumcree Church between thousands of Orangemen and their supporters on one side, and security forces on the other. Wright was angered that the march was being blocked, and was often seen at Drumcree with Harold Gracey, head of the Portadown Orange Lodge.

Wright's brigade smuggled homemade weaponry to Drumcree, apparently unhindered by the Orangemen. On 7 July, a day into the standoff, members of Wright's brigade shot dead Catholic taxi driver Michael McGoldrick near Aghagallon. The man who killed McGoldrick said he had also planned, along with Billy Wright and Mark Fulton, to kidnap three priests from a parochial house in County Armagh and shoot them unless the march was allowed to continue. Allegedly, the brigade also planned to drive petrol tankers into the Catholic area and blow them up. After four days of loyalist protests and violence throughout Northern Ireland, the police reversed their decision and allowed the march to continue.

For breaking the ceasefire, Wright and the Portadown unit of the Mid-Ulster Brigade were "stood down" by the UVF leadership on 2 August 1996.

Wright and his unit left the UVF and formed the Loyalist Volunteer Force (LVF). He personally chose its codename of "Covenant", which was used to claim LVF attacks.

Although behind many attacks in the Mid-Ulster area, especially in Portadown and Lurgan, Wright was arrested in January 1997 on charges of issuing death threats and perverting the course of justice. He was convicted in March 1997 and sentenced to eight years in the Maze Prison. There he demanded a separate wing for LVF prisoners. The authorities agreed and the wing became a gathering point for loyalists opposed to the Northern Ireland peace process, including many men from Belfast and north Down.

=== Death of Billy Wright ===
On 27 December 1997, Wright was assassinated by three Irish National Liberation Army (INLA) prisoners inside the Maze Prison: Christopher "Crip" McWilliams, John Glennon and John Kennaway. The three were imprisoned in the same block as Wright. He was shot as he travelled in a prison van. After killing Wright, the three surrendered to prison guards. They also delivered a statement: "Billy Wright was executed [...] for directing and waging his campaign of terror against the nationalist people from his prison cell".

That night, LVF gunmen opened fire on the dance hall of the Glengannon Hotel, near Dungannon. The hotel was owned by Catholics and about 400 teenagers were attending a disco there. Three civilians were wounded and one, a former Provisional IRA volunteer, was killed. Police believed that the disco was the intended target, rather than the ex-volunteer. Witnesses said it was "an attempt at mass-murder".

Some believed that prison authorities colluded with the INLA in Wright's killing. The INLA strongly denied these rumours. It published a detailed account of the assassination in the March/April 1999 issue of The Starry Plough newspaper.

=== Good Friday Agreement and ceasefire ===
In March 1998, during the negotiations for the Good Friday Agreement, the LVF issued a statement backing the anti-agreement Democratic Unionist Party (DUP), saying the party's leader, Ian Paisley, had got it "absolutely right". DUP Member of Parliament Willie McCrea appeared on public platforms with LVF leaders.

In May 1998 the LVF called a ceasefire and urged people to vote 'No' in the referendum on the Agreement. The Northern Ireland Office accepted its ceasefire in November, making LVF prisoners eligible for early release under the Agreement. Later, it handed over a small amount of weapons to the Independent International Commission on Decommissioning. The decommissioned weapons were as follows:

- 4 sub-machine guns
- 2 rifles
- 2 pistols
- 1 sawn-off shotgun
- 2 pipe bombs
- Various ammunition and detonators

The destruction of some of the LVF arms were recorded by video. However, since the weapons were decommissioned in mid-1998, the LVF has killed four people.

=== Post-ceasefire activities ===
In early 2000, an LVF-UVF feud began, and there were several tit-for-tat killings. The Secretary of State declared on 12 October 2001 that the government no longer recognised their ceasefire.

After its ceasefire, the LVF continued supporting the Orangemen in their protests at Drumcree. In July 2000, it was revealed that members of neo-Nazi group Combat 18 were travelling from England to join the protest. They were given shelter by LVF volunteers in Portadown and Tandragee. Combat 18 had opposed the LVF's ceasefire, but this trip was said to mark a "healing of the rift".

In 2002, Wright's successor as LVF leader, Mark Fulton, was found hanged in Maghaberry prison. It is believed that he committed suicide.

In July 2005 the Provisional IRA declared it had ended its armed campaign and would disarm. In September 2005 weapons inspectors declared that the IRA had indeed fully disarmed. In response, on 30 October that year, the LVF stated that it was standing down.

In February 2006, the Independent Monitoring Commission confirmed that the LVF-UVF feud was over. But, it said that the LVF's involvement with organised crime and drug trafficking continued, describing it as a "deeply criminal organisation". The twentieth IMC report stated that the group was small and without political purpose. Most of its violence was "more criminal than paramilitary" in nature. LVF members who continued violent activity were said to do so "for personal gain" and associated with the organisation at large only when it was helpful to do so. The report added that simple aggressive police work could damage the group's continuance.

== Timeline of attacks ==
According to the Conflict Archive on the Internet's Sutton Database, the LVF have killed 19 people, who included:

- 14 civilians (12 Catholics and 2 Protestants)
- 3 UVF members
- 1 former Provisional IRA member
- 1 of its own members

Two further killings of Catholics were claimed by the LVF, but the RUC believed that UDA members were responsible.

The following is a timeline of attacks and attempted attacks that have been claimed by, or blamed on, the LVF.

=== 1996 ===
- 7 July: in Aghagallon, the LVF shot dead Catholic taxi driver Michael McGoldrick (31) in his car. The gunmen then set it on fire. This attack was believed to be related to the Drumcree conflict; at the time, the Orange Order was being stopped from marching through the Catholic area of Portadown in their annual 'celebration'. Members of the group smuggled home-made weaponry to the protests at Drumcree church, apparently unhindered by the Orangemen.
- 10 July: The LVF was responsible for hijacking a postal van and planting a hoax bomb during rioting in Portadown.
- 25 October: LVF members carried out a failed armed robbery at the home of an Ulster Bank manager in Newcastle, County Down.

=== 1997 ===
- 3 January: Three men (James Buchanan, Jonathan Birney and Andrew Doran) accused of drug dealing by the UDA were kneecapped by members of the LVF. This was apparently an effort to punish them as an alternative to them being killed by other loyalist paramilitaries.
- 6 January: The LVF shot and injured a man in the Glandore Terrace estate, Portadown. UDA member Derek Wray had been the original intended target.
- 20 January: The LVF was believed to be behind a bomb that exploded under a van owned by a Catholic in Larne, County Antrim.
- 8 March: The LVF carried out firebomb attacks on Northern Ireland Tourist Board (NITB) offices in Banbridge and Newcastle, County Down. The attacks were believed to be a response to the NITB's marketing of the whole of Ireland as a tourist destination together with Bord Fáilte (the tourist board of the Republic of Ireland).
- 1 April: Mountpottinger Baptist Tabernacle, a Protestant church in East Belfast, was damaged in an arson attack. Although DUP press officer Sammy Wilson blamed Catholics, on 20 April Progressive Unionist Party leader David Ervine asserted it was an LVF attempt to raise sectarian tension.
- 27 April: Robert Hamill (25), a Catholic civilian, was kicked to death by a loyalist mob in Portadown town centre while walking home. Police parked nearby did not intervene. The six men charged with his murder were placed in the LVF wing of the Maze Prison at their own request.
- 12 May: The LVF kidnapped Catholic civilian Seán Brown (61) after he left the Gaelic Athletic Association (GAA) club in Bellaghy, County Londonderry. He was beaten and shot dead; his body was found the next day by a burnt-out car on Moneynick Road near Randalstown.
- 14 May: The LVF was alleged to have tried to kill a Catholic taxi driver in Milford, County Armagh. He escaped when the gunman's weapon jammed.
- 24 May: The LVF claimed responsibility for planting a bomb in Dundalk, County Louth, Republic of Ireland. The time bomb was planted in an alleyway on Clanbrassil Street, the town's main shopping street. However, after it partially exploded, it was defused by Gardaí (the Republic's police). The LVF warned that further "no-warning bomb attacks" would take place "as long as Dublin interferes in Ulster affairs".
- 2 July: The LVF threatened to kill Catholic civilians if an upcoming Orange march was banned from the Garvaghy Road in Portadown. The group claimed responsibility for a hoax bomb under a car on the Garvaghy Road two days later.
- 15 July: The LVF killed Catholic civilian Bernadette Martin (18) in Aghalee. She was shot four times in the head as she slept in her Protestant boyfriend's home.
- 24 July: The LVF kidnapped Catholic civilian James Morgan (16) in Newcastle, County Down. He was tortured, beaten to death with a hammer, and his body was doused in petrol and set alight. His burnt and mutilated body was found three days later in a waterlogged ditch used for the disposal of animal carcasses near Clough. Norman Coopey was charged and convicted of the killing.
- 5 August: The LVF claimed responsibility for trying to kill a Catholic taxi driver in Lurgan. He escaped when the gun jammed.
- 12 August: Twenty-seven LVF prisoners in the Maze Prison began a riot which caused severe damage to C and D wings of H-Block 6.
- 13-14 August: The LVF was blamed for attacks on the homes of four serving and former prison officers in Mid-Ulster.
- 17 November: The LVF claimed responsibility for planting four small bombs in Dundalk, Republic of Ireland, which were removed by police.
- 5 December: The LVF shot dead Catholic civilian Gerry Devlin (36) outside a GAA club in Glengormley, County Antrim.
- 27 December: The LVF launched a gun attack on the dance hall of the Catholic-owned Glengannon Hotel near Dungannon, County Tyrone. Hundreds of teenagers were attending a disco inside when a gunman opened fire on the entrance with a VZ58 assault rifle. A doorman, Catholic civilian Seamus Dillon (45), was killed and three other people were wounded. Although initially believed to be retaliation for the killing of Billy Wright in HMP Maze earlier that day, RUC intelligence later deemed it to be a pre-planned attempted mass casualty attack, and that Dillon's approach to the getaway vehicle caused the gunmen to abort. The LVF said: "This attack and future attacks lay squarely at the feet of republicans. For too long the Protestant people have watched their very faith, culture and identity being slowly eroded away".
- 31 December: The LVF claimed responsibility for a gun attack on the Clifton Tavern on Cliftonville Road, Belfast. Gunmen burst into the pub and sprayed it with gunfire. Catholic civilian Eddie Treanor (31) was killed and five others were wounded. Although claimed by the LVF, authorities believed that UDA members were involved, specifically Shankill Road 'C' company gunman Stephen McKeag.

=== 1998 ===
- 10 January: The LVF launched a gun attack on the Space nightclub at Talbot Street, Belfast. Gunmen pulled up in a car and opened fire on people standing at the door. A doorman, Catholic civilian Terry Enright (28), was killed. He was a cross-community worker who helped steer young people away from violence. The LVF said it was revenge for the killing of Billy Wright by INLA.
- 18 January: The LVF killed Catholic civilian Fergal McCusker (28) in Maghera, County Londonderry. He was kidnapped and shot dead while walking home. His body was found behind a youth center off Tircane Road.
- 19 January: The LVF claimed responsibility for shooting dead Catholic taxi driver Larry Brennan (52) as he sat in his car on Ormeau Road, Belfast. The attack happened hours after the INLA killed UDA member Jim Guiney. Police believe UDA members were involved.
- 23 January: The LVF shot dead Catholic construction worker Liam Conway (39) as he operated a digger on Hesketh Road, Belfast.
- 24 January: The LVF shot dead Catholic taxi driver John McColgan (33) in Belfast. He had picked up a number of men on the Andersonstown Road, who told him to drive to Upper Glen Road. They shot him, dumped his body by the roadside, and drove off in the taxi.
- 25 January: The LVF claimed responsibility for shooting and wounding a Catholic civilian in Lurgan. The man was sitting in the cab of a lorry when a lone gunman shot at him several times.
- 27 January: The LVF was blamed for trying to kill a Catholic taxi driver in North Belfast. He escaped when the gun jammed.
- 27 January: The Northern Ireland Council for Voluntary Action (NICVA) announced that the LVF had issued death threats against a number of Catholic cross-community workers in the Mid-Ulster area.
- 4 February: The LVF admitted firing a shot at a Protestant man in Lurgan and warned him to leave the area.
- 23 February: The LVF claimed responsibility for planting a small car bomb outside a Garda station in Dromad, County Louth, Republic of Ireland. It was spotted and defused by the security forces. The LVF threatened further attacks in the Republic.
- 27 February: The LVF was blamed for a beer keg bomb left in a car in the predominantly Nationalist town of Carnlough, County Antrim. The device was neutralised by the British Army.
- 3 March: The LVF killed a Catholic and a Protestant civilian—Damian Trainor (26) and Philip Allen (34)—in the Railway Bar in Poyntzpass, County Armagh. Gunmen entered the Catholic-owned pub, told them to lie on the floor and then shot them dead. The two were close friends.
- 5 March: The LVF was blamed for a gun attack on a house in a mainly-Protestant area of Antrim. A Catholic man and his Protestant wife lived there. She and her daughter were wounded.
- 8 March: The LVF issued threats against Protestant churchmen, business leaders and politicians who it claimed were "colluding" with the peace process.
- 17 March: The LVF claimed responsibility for an attempted bomb attack on St Comgall's parish centre in Larne. The building was packed with people celebrating Saint Patrick's Day when two men threw a bomb through the door. The bomb failed to explode and was defused.
- 21 April: The LVF killed Catholic civilian Adrian Lamph (29) in Portadown. A gunman cycled into his workplace—the Fairgreen amenity site on Duke Street—then singled him out and shot him. He was the first victim of the conflict since the signing of the Good Friday Agreement.
- 25 April: The LVF shot dead a Catholic civilian, Ciaran Heffron (22), as he walked home in Crumlin, County Antrim. Meanwhile, 25 civilians escaped injury when a bomb was thrown into a Catholic-owned pub and restaurant at Aghinlig, County Armagh.
- 15 May: The LVF announced an "unequivocal ceasefire" which it hoped would encourage people to vote against the Good Friday Agreement.
- 2 July: The LVF was blamed for setting fire to ten Catholic churches in Northern Ireland. Churches were burnt over a ten-hour period in Crumlin, Lisburn, Dromore, Castlewellan, Banbridge, Laurencetown, Tandragee and Dungannon. The attacks were believed to be a response to the banning of the Orange Order's Drumcree march. The LVF was also blamed for petrol bombing the homes of two Catholics in Derry.
- 9 July: The LVF threw a pipe bomb at a two vehicle mobile military patrol near Union street in Portadown.
- 9 July: A blast bomb is thrown at police lines at Drumcree church by senior LVF volunteer William James Fulton, which resulted in 4 officers being seriously injured when it detonated
- 11 July: An LVF gunman opened fire on British security forces manning a barricade blocking the Orange Order from marching at Drumcree.
- 15 July: A package addressed to a Dublin hotel, which was believed to have been sent by the LVF, exploded while it was being examined at the Garda Technical Bureau. Two were injured in the blast.
- 8 August: The LVF issued a statement saying that its "war is over".

=== 1999 onward ===
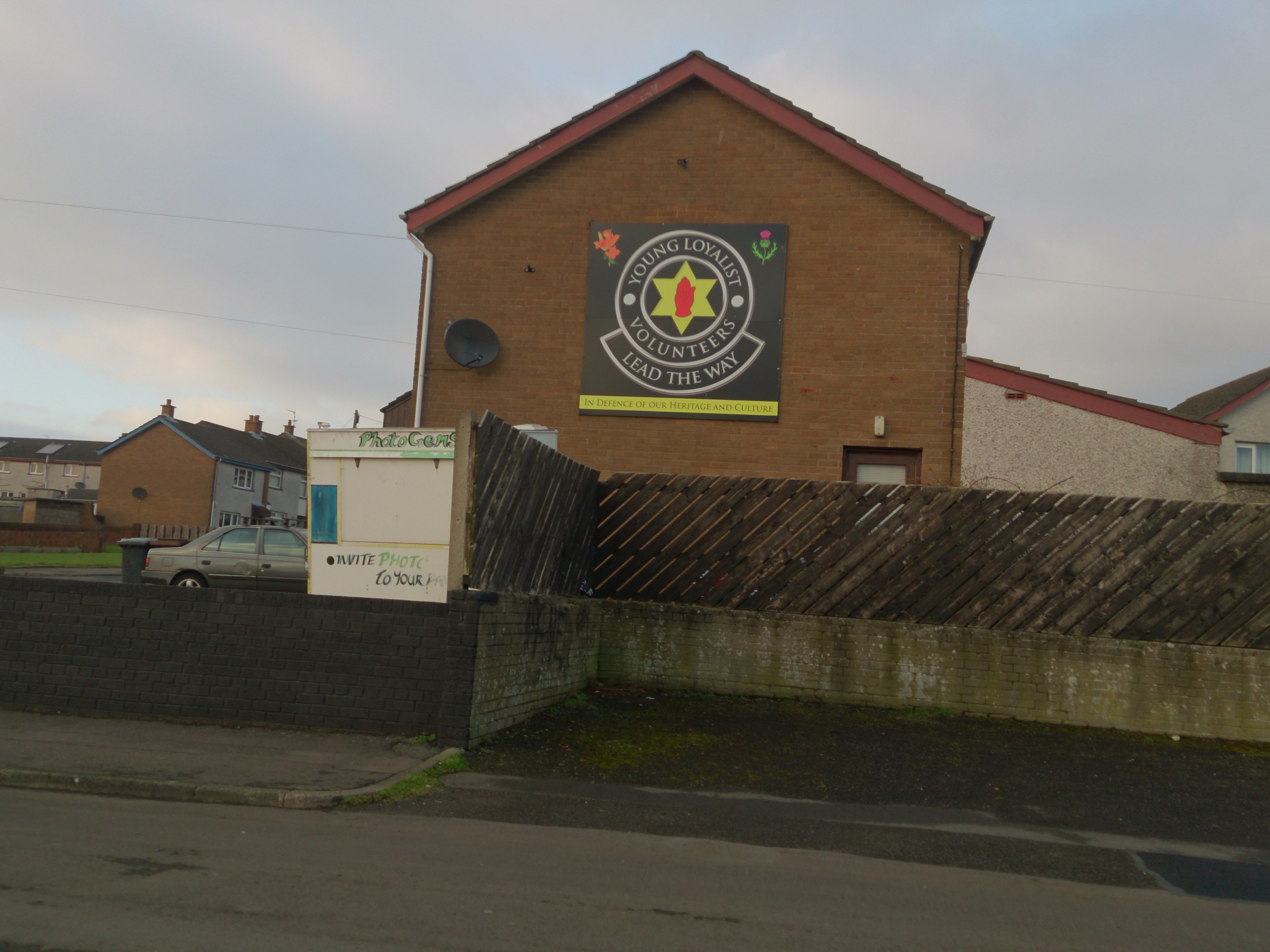
Young Loyalist Volunteers symbol, Ballycraigy

- 26 March 1999: The LVF warned that there would be a great strain on its ceasefire if the Provisional IRA did not begin disarming.
- 4 June 1999: The LVF carried out a Grenade attack on the home of a Catholic man on the Ballyweely road near Hilltown in County Down. The mans children and nephew were also in the house at the time though no one was injured.
- 5 June 1999: LVF members launched pipe bomb attacks on two houses in the Corcrain area of Portadown. One of them killed Protestant civilian Elizabeth O'Neill (59), who was married to a Catholic man.
- 10 January 2000: LVF members killed the UVF's Mid-Ulster commander, Richard Jameson (46). He was shot dead while sitting in his car outside his home on Derrylettiff Road near Portadown. He was also a member of the Orange Order. The killing was part of a loyalist feud.
- 26 May 2000: LVF members shot dead UVF member Martin Taylor (35) at his home on Silverstream Park, Belfast. This killing was part of a loyalist feud.
- 11 April 2001: LVF members shot dead UVF member Grahame Marks (37) at his home in Tandragee. He was also a member of the Orange Order. This killing was part of a loyalist feud.
- 28 February 2005: Members of the LVF were suspected to have been responsible for the disappearance of Lisa Dorrian (25) after a drugs party at a caravan park in Ballyhalbert, although the PSNI subsequently ruled out the involvement of any paramilitary group in her murder.

== Young Loyalist Volunteers ==
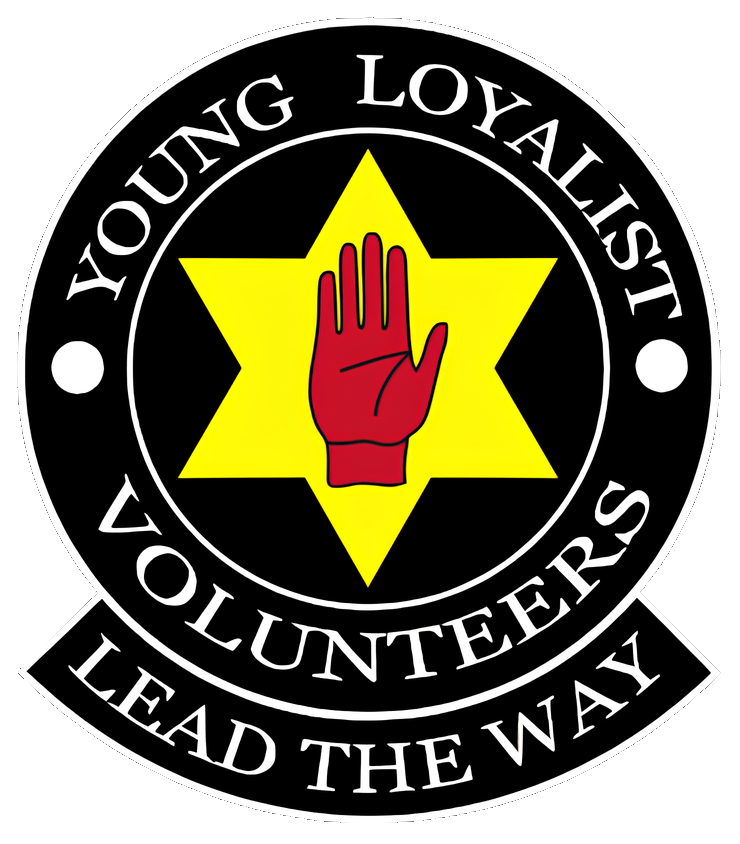
Emblem of the YLV

The youth division of the LVF was known as the Young Loyalist Volunteers (YLV). They were founded in 1997 and officially ended their activities in 2005.

== See also ==
- Orange Volunteers
- Red Hand Defenders
