= Public Prosecution Service for Northern Ireland =

Non-ministerial department in Northern Ireland

- Logo of the Public Prosecution Service

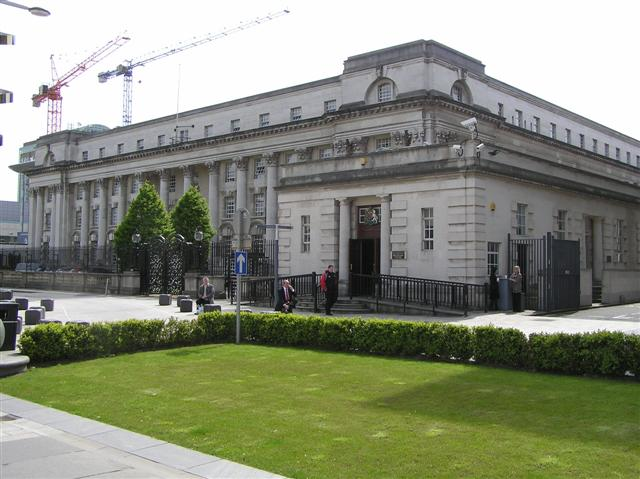
- Royal Courts of Justice, Belfast

Department overview
- Formed: June 13, 2005
- Preceding Department: Department of the Director of Public Prosecutions
- Type: Non-ministerial government department
- Jurisdiction: Northern Ireland
- Headquarters: Belfast Chambers, 93 Chichester Street, Belfast, BT1 3JR; 54.59664°N 5.92206°W
- Motto: Independent, Fair, Effective
- Employees: 399.2 FTE (2020-21)
- Annual budget: £38.4 million (2020-21)
- Department executives: Stephen Herron, Director of Public Prosecutions for Northern Ireland; Michael Agnew, Deputy Director of Public Prosecutions for Northern Ireland; Marianne O'Kane, Senior Assistant Director of Public Prosecutions for Northern Ireland
- Website: www.ppsni.gov.uk

The Public Prosecution Service for Northern Ireland (PPSNI) is the department of the Northern Ireland Executive responsible for public prosecutions of people charged with criminal offences in Northern Ireland. It is headed by the Director of Public Prosecutions for Northern Ireland. Its role is similar to that of the longer-established Crown Office and Procurator Fiscal Service in Scotland, and the Crown Prosecution Service in England and Wales. The PPSNI employs 50 Public Prosecutors and over 100 administrative staff.

The Police Service of Northern Ireland investigate crimes. The PPSNI advise the police on possible prosecutions, authorise charge, review cases submitted by the police, prepare for and present cases in court.

It was established by the Justice (Northern Ireland) Act 2002. Prior to its establishment the police themselves would prosecute most offences, with some being referred to the former Department of the Director of Public Prosecutions.

The Director of Public Prosecutions for Northern Ireland is appointed by the Attorney General for Northern Ireland.

== See also ==
- Crown Prosecution Service, equivalent body in England and Wales
- Crown Office and Procurator Fiscal Service, equivalent body in Scotland
