= List of helicopter prison escapes =

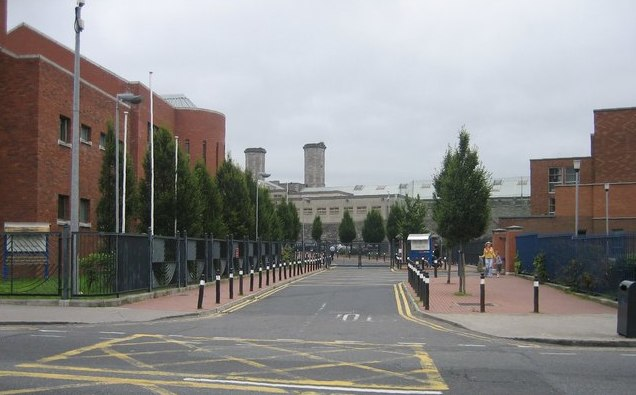
Mountjoy Prison where on October 31, 1973, three IRA members escaped in a hijacked helicopter

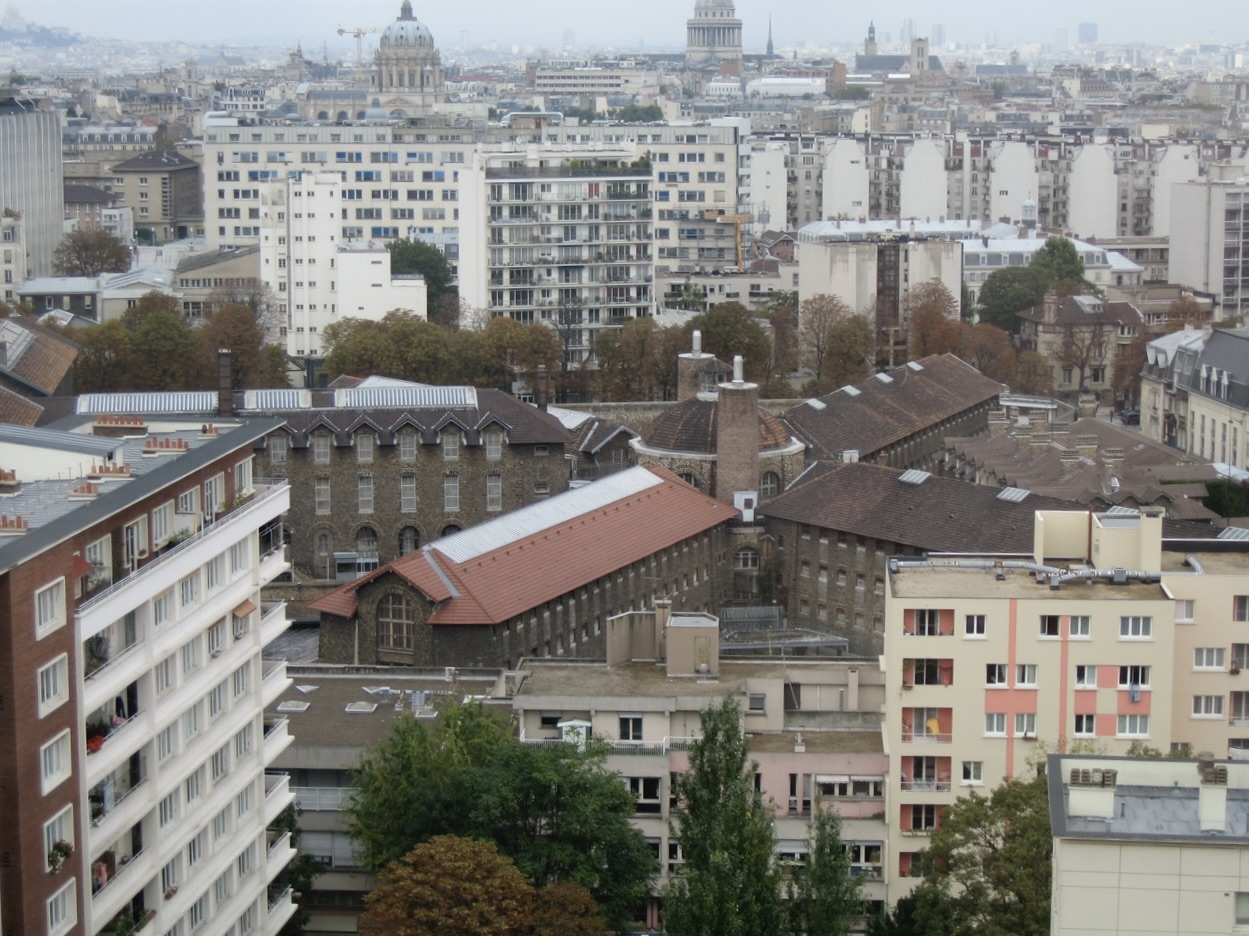
Prison de la Santé where on May 26, 1986, Michel Vaujour was flown out of the prison by his wife

There have been multiple prison escapes where an inmate escapes by means of a helicopter. One of the earliest instances was the escape of Joel David Kaplan, nicknamed "Man Fan", on August 19, 1971, from the Santa Martha Acatitla in Mexico. Kaplan was a New York businessman who not only escaped the prison but eventually got out of Mexico and went on to write a book about his experience, The 10-Second Jailbreak.

France has had more recorded helicopter prison escape attempts than any other country, with at least 11. One of the most notable French jail breaks occurred in 1986, when the wife of bank robber Michel Vaujour, Nadine Vaujour, studied for months to learn how to fly a helicopter. Using her newly acquired skills, she rented a white helicopter and flew low over Paris to take her husband from the roof of his fortress prison. Vaujour was later seriously wounded in a shootout with police where he was shot in the head and his wife was arrested.

The record for most helicopter escapes goes to convicted murderer Pascal Payet, who has used helicopters to escape from prisons in 2001, 2003, and most recently 2007.

Another multiple helicopter escapee is Vassilis Palaiokostas, who on February 22, 2009, escaped for the second time from the same prison.

To thwart attempts of this nature, many prisons have taken precautions such as nets or cables strung over open prison courtyards.

This list includes prisoner escapes where a helicopter was used in an attempt to free prisoners from a place of internment, a prison or correctional facility.

== Actual attempts ==
Date	Prison name	Country	Succeeded	Escapee(s)	Details
August 19, 1971	Santa Martha Acatitla	Mexico	Yes	Joel David Kaplan Carlos Antonio Contreras Castro	Kaplan was a New York businessman who had been arrested for murder in 1962 in Mexico City and was incarcerated at the Santa Martha Acatitla prison in the Iztapalapa borough. Joel's sister, Judy Kaplan, arranged the means to help Kaplan escape, and on the aforementioned date, a helicopter landed in the prison yard. The guards mistakenly thought this was an official visit. In two minutes, Kaplan and his cellmate Contreras, a Venezuelan counterfeiter, were able to board the craft and were piloted away, before any shots were fired. Both men were flown to Texas and then different planes flew Kaplan to California and Contreras to Guatemala. The Mexican government never initiated extradition proceedings against Kaplan. The escape is told in a book, The 10-Second Jailbreak: The Helicopter Escape of Joel David Kaplan. It also inspired the 1975 action movie Breakout, which starred Charles Bronson and Robert Duvall.
October 31, 1973	Mountjoy Jail, Dublin	Ireland	Yes	JB O'Hagan; Seamus Twomey; Kevin Mallon	An IRA member hijacked a helicopter and forced the pilot to land in the exercise yard of the prison's D Wing at 3:40 p.m. Three prisoners who were also members of the IRA escaped aboard the helicopter. Another prisoner was quoted as saying, "One shamefaced screw apologised to the governor and said he thought it was the new Minister for Defence (Paddy Donegan) arriving. I told him it was our Minister of Defence leaving." The escape became Republican lore and was immortalized by "The Helicopter Song", which contains the lines "It's up like a bird and over the city. There's three men a'missing I heard the warder say".
May 24, 1978	United States Penitentiary, Marion, Illinois	United States	No	Garrett Brock Trapnell; Martin Joseph McNally; James Kenneth Johnson	43-year-old Barbara Ann Oswald hijacked a Saint Louis-based charter helicopter and forced the pilot to land in the prison yard. While landing the aircraft, the pilot, Allen Barklage, who was a Vietnam War veteran, struggled with Oswald and managed to wrestle the gun away from her. Barklage then shot and killed Oswald, thwarting the escape. A few months later Oswald's daughter hijacked TWA Flight 541 in an effort to free Trapnell.
February 27, 1981	Fleury-Mérogis, Essonne, Île-de-France	France	Yes	Gérard Dupré; Daniel Beaumont	With the help of Serge Coutel, Dupré and Beaumont succeeded in the first and double helicopter escape of a French prison, in what was regarded as the most secure in the country. The men hijacked a helicopter and its pilot that they rented to fly from Paris to Orléans. The pilot, Claude Fourcade, was taken hostage and was falsely told that they were holding his wife and daughter hostage. The flight landed at Porte d'Orléans.
May 7, 1981	Orsainville Prison, Quebec City	Canada	No	Marina Paquet (hijacker); Giles Arseneault (prisoner)	Paquet held a sawed-off shotgun against the back of the head of Jet Ranger helicopter pilot Brian Jenner. She demanded that he land in the prison courtyard, where her boyfriend (awaiting extradition to California on a murder charge) was set to escape. Jenner feigned a panic attack, put the helicopter through some rough maneuvers and was then able to convince Paquet, in the back seat of the Jet Ranger, to turn over her shotgun and her knife. Jenner then gave her the choice of any landing spot, except the prison. She chose to go back to the airport. The pilot then explained, in great detail, exactly where they were and where they would be landing on arrival at the Quebec City airport. He added that the police would surely be aware by then, that she had hijacked the helicopter but would not yet be aware that she had given up her arms to the pilot. All the time Jenner was squeezing the transmit button on his cyclic stick and the tower was picking up all the details. The moment they touched down at the airport, the woman left the helicopter but the police, who had been advised of the situation by the control tower, were hiding nearby, and captured Paquet within seconds.
January, 1983	Pentridge (HM Prison)	Australia	No	David McMillan	Three suspects, all held on drug-importation charges, hired a former SAS soldier, then living in the Philippines, to lift the prisoners from the prison's tennis court to a nearby van fitted with panels to hide them for the 600 kilometre road trip to Sydney, where a yacht was to take them to Manila. The plan was thwarted when Lord Tony Moynihan, himself an exile in the Philippines, informed the Australian Federal Police, who then ran it as a sting operation. Of the accused, only McMillan and his accountant friend who had visited the prison stood trial. During the hearings, few prosecution witnesses used their real names as they were mostly from Moynihan's former West African MI6 unit. Those on trial were convicted and sentenced.
December 19, 1985	Perry Correctional Institution, Pelzer, South Carolina	United States	Yes	James Rodney Leonard; William Douglas Ballew; Jesse Glenn Smith	Leonard, a murderer, Ballew and Smith, who were both armed robbers, fled in a helicopter with a pilot and a woman hijacker with a pistol to a getaway car 4 to 5 miles away. The 3-passenger helicopter was so overloaded with 5 occupants that it barely cleared the fence, while flying away in a hail of gunfire that injured one guard. Two other men attempted to escape as well, but either jumped or were pushed off when the pilot told the escapees that the helicopter could not take off. The three escapees were captured on December 23 in Camden County, Georgia.
December 31, 1985	Cândido Mendes penitentiary, Ilha Grande, Rio de Janeiro	Brazil	Yes	José Carlos dos Reis Encina, a.k.a. "Escadinha"	Encina, a drug lord, was rescued by José Carlos Gregório, aka "Gordo", who rented the Bell 47 aircraft under the guise of surveying some lands he intended to buy. "Gordo" forced the pilot to land and pick up Encina, who had escaped the prison proper earlier. Encina was recaptured three months later after being shot in a firefight.
May 26, 1986	Prison de la Santé	France	Yes	Michel Vaujour	Vaujour had 28 years to serve for attempted murder and armed robbery; this was his fourth escape attempt. He made his way to the roof by threatening guards with a fake pistol and nectarines painted as grenades. On top of the jail he was picked up by his wife Nadine, who had taken helicopter pilot lessons especially for the escape. They landed at a nearby football pitch and fled in a waiting car. Paris-Match published amateur photos of the escape, which was made into a film starring Béatrice Dalle in 1991.
November 5, 1986	Federal Correctional Institution, Dublin, California	United States	Yes	Samantha Lopez	Ronald J. McIntosh walked away from a minimum security prison on October 28 and then hijacked a helicopter on November 5. He used the helicopter to free Lopez from the prison. Both were later caught on November 15 when they arrived to pick up wedding rings from a California shopping mall. The authorities were monitoring the account McIntosh used to write the check and the police were waiting for them. McIntosh for his role in the escape was sentenced to 25 years in prison. Lopez was given five years added to her 50-year sentence for a 1981 bank robbery in Georgia. As they were driven away to their separate prisons McIntosh was able to lean out of a car window and yell, "I love you!" to Lopez. Lopez was released from prison on 20 April 2010.
November 23, 1986	Prigione di Rebibbia, Rome	Italy	Yes	André Bellaïche; Gianluigi Esposito; Luciano Cipollari	A Red Cross helicopter was hijacked by two gunmen and forced to fly to the courtyard of the maximum-security prison. The pilot hovered the helicopter three feet off the courtyard ground while around 50 inmates were exercising. While the hijackers laid covering fire, the three inmates tried to board the helicopter. Bellaiche, 36, was a Tunisian-born Frenchman who was in prison for murder and bank robbery. Esposito, 30, was an arms smuggler accused of providing weapons to Italian terrorists. Cipollari, 24, an Italian extradited from France in 1985 for murder, slipped and fell preventing him from escaping. The helicopter flew to a nearby football field scattering an ongoing game. The men ran out of the helicopter and hijacked a car to escape. They later managed to flee Italy, but police was able to track them down and they were both arrested again on December 13, 1986. Esposito later revealed that he had intentionally prevented Cipollari from boarding, because he was just 2 years away from being released.
December 10, 1987	Gartree (HM Prison)	United Kingdom	Yes	Sydney Draper; John Kendall	At 3:16 p.m., Kendall and Draper were sprung from Gartree's exercise yard with the aid of a hijacked Bell 206L helicopter. Kendall was a gangland boss serving eight years while Draper was imprisoned for murder and serving a life sentence. The escape caused great controversy at the time and led to a tightening of security at the prison. Kendall was recaptured 10 days later but Draper remained at large for 13 months.
July 11, 1988	Penitentiary of New Mexico	United States	Yes	Danny Mahoney; Francis Mitchell; Randy Lackey	Pilot Charles Bella was hired to fly a real estate agent around the Santa Fe area. As he was flying his Aerospatiale Gazelle helicopter the passenger pulled a gun and forced him to land in the prison courtyard. The three inmates jumped in and he flew the aircraft to another site, pursued by a US Customs Service helicopter that was later joined by a state police helicopter. Pursuing helicopters claimed that Bella tried to force them down through aggressive maneuvers. However, they were able to tail him and police were waiting for the helicopter every time it touched down. Mitchell and Lackey were captured almost right away while Mahoney was later captured with assistance from a canine unit.
August 2, 1988	Cárcel Bellavista, Bello, Colombia	Colombia	Yes	Dandeny Muñoz; Brances Muñoz	Two of Pablo Escobar's hitmen were freed: two brothers with aliases "La Quica" and "Tyson".
December 23, 1988	Cárcel Bellavista, Bello, Colombia	Colombia	Yes	—	Three gunmen hijacked a helicopter near Medellín. Five prisoners escaped from the prison compound by clinging to the runners of the helicopter that flew off in a hail of bullets. According to the warden, the five escapees were not drug trafficers.
April 17, 1989	Federal Holding Facility, Miami, Florida	United States	No	Ben Kramer	Kramer, a famous Apache Boat owner and racer tried to escape by helicopter from the prison. The escape failed when the rookie pilot, Charles Clayton Stevens, hovered 12 inches off the ground in a very tight space (200 feet long by 50 feet wide). When the 6'2", 240 lb Kramer jumped into the small two seater Bell 47D-1 trainer, its rear rotor struck the razor wire, causing it to be uncontrollable. Stevens made an attempt to take off anyway. One of the skids caught on the razor wire, causing the helicopter to catapult over the fence and crash into the prison grounds. Both Kramer and Stevens sustained extensive injuries. Kramer was serving life without parole for Racketeer Influenced and Corrupt Organizations Act (RICO) charges resulting from drug trafficking, and also pleaded guilty to the murder of fellow boat builder and racer Don Aronow, owner of Cigarette Off Shore Boats.
August 19, 1989	Arkansas Valley Correctional Facility, Colorado	United States	Yes	Ralph Brown; Freddie Gonzales	Brown and Gonzales were able to escape via helicopter. Two women, Rebecca Brown and Patricia Gonzales chartered a helicopter out of Denver. Once airborne the women held handguns to pilot Tim Graves head and ordered him to land in the prison yard to pick up the two men. They were recaptured in Holdrege, Nebraska that night after firing at law enforcement officers.
June 19, 1990	Kent Penitentiary, British Columbia	Canada	Yes	Robert Ford; David Thomas	Ford and Thomas escaped when a hijacked helicopter landed in the courtyard. They were captured by the RCMP at Harrison Lake two days later. Correctional Officer R. Kirby was shot during the incident and survived. The pilot, Fred Fandrich of Valley Helicopters, was not injured. The Bell 206 helicopter was damaged by gunfire from prison guards.
April 7, 1991	Rio Piedras State Penitentiary, Puerto Rico	Puerto Rico	Yes	William Lane	Several inmates were able to escape when a helicopter plucked them from the prison. The escape prompted the Puerto Rico House Government Committee to pass a regulation that allowed penal officials to fire on any helicopter aiding an escape attempt. Plans for the escape have been attributed to drug dealer Papo Cachete, who died during 2019.
February 24, 1992	Lyon Prison	France	Yes	—	Two armed men hijacked a helicopter in Albertville as it was about to take off to pick up skiers in the Alps and forced the pilot to fly to the prison. The helicopter landed in the courtyard and three prisoners clambered aboard. After this successful escape, cables were strung across the central yard at five-metre intervals.
December 1992	Touraine Central Prison, Tours	France	No	—	The would-be escapee was shot dead by prison guards; three others were wounded.
June 17, 1993	Touraine Central Prison, Tours	France	No	Michel Vaujour	Vaujour and his wife were imprisoned in 1991. A man and woman hijacked a helicopter and held the pilot's family hostage. The wife alerted police and the prison was locked down before the helicopter arrived. It returned to its base, from where the hijackers escaped in a car.
December 30, 1996	High Security Prison, Santiago	Chile	Yes	Four members of the Manuel Rodriguez Patriotic Front	Two women suspected of involvement were Irish citizens, raising suspicions of a Provisional IRA link to the left-wing rebel escapees.
September 18, 1997	De Geerhorst prison	Netherlands	No	—	The escape attempt failed when the helicopter crashed into the prison ground . The helicopter had been stolen earlier in Belgium. The pilot was killed and the Colombian escapee, who was serving a long-term sentence for drug trafficking, walked away with slight injuries.
March 25, 1999	Metropolitan Remand and Reception Centre	Australia	Yes	John Killick	Librarian Lucy Dudko hired a helicopter under the pretence of checking out the upcoming Olympic site in Sydney. Using a gun she forced pilot Tim Joyce to land on the prison grounds. Waiting was Killick, who was serving 28 years for armed robbery. He jumped in the helicopter while being fired on by guards and cheered on by inmates. They landed in a park where Killick hijacked a taxi at gunpoint. The two were able to elude authorities for six weeks before being arrested at the Bass Hill Tourist Park. Dudko, dubbed Red Lucy by the media, was sentenced to the maximum of 10 years and was sent to Mulawa Correctional Centre women's prison. On May 9, 2006, she was released on parole after serving 7 years of her sentence. Killick was released on January 22, 2015, but is not allowed to have contact with Dudko until he turns 80 years old.
June 5, 2000	Martin Treatment Center for Sexually Violent Predators, Martin County, Florida	United States	Yes	Steven Whitsett	Whitsett was serving a civil commitment as a Sexually Violent Predator at the prison. At approximately 1 p.m., correctional officers patrolling the perimeter of the treatment center reported a helicopter approaching from south of the facility. Piloted by Clifford Burkhart, a former lover of Whitsett, the helicopter landed inside the fenced compound. While Whitsett was climbing aboard, the helicopter struck an object. As a result of the damage the helicopter crashed about 100 yards south of the perimeter fence. Twenty-six hours from the time of the escape, a Martin County Sheriff's deputy spotted Whitsett and Burkhart from a search helicopter. The two men were in a canal, in shoulder-deep water, four miles east of the treatment facility. For the escape and weapons charges stemming from the escape Whitsett received a criminal sentence of 25 years. Whitsett was awaiting a retrial when his conviction was overturned in 2007. For his part in the escape, Burkhart was sentenced to 7 years, followed by 10 years of probation. Burkhart was released from prison in 2007.
December 13, 2000	Lyon prison	France	Yes	—	Three men were able to escape by having an accomplice fly a hijacked helicopter over the prison. A net was lowered and the three inmates were able to grab hold and lifted to freedom. Guards were able to fatally shoot one of the convicts. The remaining two were recaptured after a gun battle with police.
January 19, 2001	Luynes prison	France	Yes	Pascal Payet	Payet escaped using a hijacked helicopter.
March 24, 2001	Draguignan prison	France	Yes	Abdelhamid Carnous; Emile Forma-Sari; Jean-Philippe Lecase	An armed man hijacked a helicopter from a nearby airfield. The pilot was forced to land in the prison courtyard. Three convicts managed to get aboard before flying 60 kilometres (37 mi) away. Landing in the village of Auribeau-sur-Siagne, the pilot was released and the men got into a waiting getaway car. The escapees were later identified as convicted armed robbers.
May 28, 2001	Fresnes prison	France	No	—	(Although not a helicopter escape in the truest sense, it is listed here because of the large role a helicopter played in the incident). A hijacked helicopter flew over the prison and dropped weapons in the exercise yard. Two prisoners armed with a bulletproof vest, an automatic pistol and a Kalashnikov dropped by the helicopter were able to take three guards hostage in an attempt to escape. The hostage drama lasted about 24 hours before the prisoners surrendered.
January 17, 2002	Parada Neto Penitentiary	Brazil	Yes	—	Two men rented a helicopter pretending to be tourists wanting a panoramic ride over São Paulo. While in the air they drew guns and forced the pilot to land in the central yard of the prison. The two inmates, who were serving time for murder and bank robbery, jumped aboard, and when the pilot took off again guards opened fire. The helicopter was found abandoned on a football pitch 50 kilometres (31 mi) away full of bullet holes.
December 30, 2002	Las Cucharas prison, Ponce, Puerto Rico	United States	Yes	Orlando Cartagena; Jose Rodriguez; Victor Diaz; Hector Diaz; Jose Tapia	Two men rented a helicopter saying they wanted to inspect construction sites. They forced the pilot at gunpoint to land on the roof of the prison where they picked up the five convicts. To reach the roof the inmates cut a hole in the chain link fence. One was forced to hang onto the skids outside the helicopter as there was no room inside. Cartagena was serving a 254-year sentence for murder, Rodriguez was serving 319 years for murder, Victor Diaz was serving 113 years, Hector Diaz was serving 109 years, while Tapia was serving 100 years. Of the five, only Victor Diaz was not recaptured immediately. The inmates claimed to have killed him soon after the break-out. He later surrendered himself to authorities in January 2003.
April 4, 2003	Luynes prison	France	Yes	Eric Alboreo; Franck Perletto; Michel Valero	Pascal Payet organized the helicopter escape of the three men using a hijacked helicopter. Payet himself escaped from the same prison in 2001. He and the three men were later captured but in July 2007 again escaped by helicopter from Grasse prison in south-east France.
July 2005	France	France	No	—	A helicopter escape attempt was foiled when alarms were set off as the helicopter tried to land on the roof.
December 10, 2005	Aiton Prison	France	Yes	Hubert Selles; Jean-Claude Moretti; Mohamed Bessame	Two men rented a helicopter under the pretense of using it to do some back-country cross-country skiing. Brandishing guns, the men forced the pilot to land in the prison yard where the three inmates boarded the helicopter. One inmate was serving time for a drugs-related conviction, one for armed robbery and the third for leading a robbery. The helicopter landed in open country near Grenoble where they left the pilot after relieving him of his phone and radio.
June 6, 2006	Korydallos Prison	Greece	Yes	Vassilis Paleokostas; Alket Rizai	Nikos Paleokostas and another man hijacked a helicopter, forcing it to land on the prison roof. Two convicts scrambled on, Nikos's brother, Vassilis who was sentenced to a 25-year sentence for kidnapping and bank robbery and Rizai, who was serving a life sentence for manslaughter. The helicopter flew to a nearby graveyard from where they fled on motorcycles.
April 15, 2007	Lantin Prison, Liège	Belgium	Yes	Eric Ferdinand	Two men hijacked a small helicopter and forced pilot Eric Mathieu to land in the courtyard to pick up Ferdinand. Earlier the hijackers paid for the flight at an airfield near Sint-Truiden saying they were tourists from Marseille but eventually pulled out a pistol and grenade. Ferdinand said he landed around 200 inmates. One climbed on board while the hijackers threw tear gas canisters into the crowd. The helicopter then landed less than a half-mile from the prison, where Ferdinand and the two hijackers got in a waiting car and drove off. At the time of his escape, Ferdinand was waiting to be extradited to Spain, from where he had escaped from a prison while serving a sentence for theft, forgery and embezzlement. Ferdinand was later arrested and was extradited from Italy to Belgium. In February 2008, he was sentenced to six years in prison for the escape. Three of his accomplices also received prison terms.
July 15, 2007	Grasse prison	France	Yes	Pascal Payet	Payet escaped for the third time using a helicopter that was hijacked by four masked men from Cannes – Mandelieu Airport. The helicopter landed some time later at Brignoles, 38 kilometres (24 mi) north-east of Toulon, on the Mediterranean coast. Payet and his accomplices then fled the scene and the pilot was released unharmed. Payet gained notoriety for using a helicopter in 2001 to escape from Luynes prison and then while still on the run in 2003 organized another escape for fellow inmates from the same prison. Payet had been serving a 30-year sentence for a murder committed during a robbery on a security van.
October 28, 2007	Ittre prison	Belgium	No	Nordin Benallal	Benallal, a self-styled "escape king", arranged accomplices to hijack a helicopter near the prison. However, the helicopter was swarmed by other prisoners, floundered and crashed. Benallal and his cohorts then seized two prison guards as hostages and fled in a car parked nearby. He was arrested again two days later by Dutch police in The Hague. Benallal was facing over 50 years of prison time and had several convictions for armed robbery, carjacking, and previous escape attempts. He had previously run from a prison van, walked out of prison wearing a wig and sunglasses and scaled a prison wall with a rope ladder.
February 22, 2009	Korydallos Prison	Greece	Yes	Vasilis Paleokostas; Alket Rizai	The two men escaped from the prison by helicopter. They had escaped in a similar manner during 2006 but they were eventually arrested. Their new prison break took place while their trial for the 2006 helicopter-assisted escape was ongoing. They were transferred to the prison just one day before their new escape, in order to attend their trial. Rizai was recaptured in November 2009. Paleokostas remains at large.
April 27, 2009	Domenjod Prison, Réunion	France	Yes	Juliano Verbard; Alexin Jismy; Fabrice Michel	Verbard was the founder of the Sorrowful and Immaculate Heart of Mary religious movement launched in 2002 on the island. He was arrested and imprisoned 15 years in February 2008 for attacks on children aged nine and 13. Verbard escaped after three armed accomplices, posing as tourists, hijacked a helicopter and landed in the exercise yard of the prison. He escaped with Jismy and Michel, a father and son duo who were also his followers. Once the three were aboard they took off and landed in a nearby clearing where a van was waiting. The three were recaptured on May 6, 2009.
July 23, 2009	Bruges	Belgium	Yes	Ashraf Sekkaki plus three other criminals	A man hijacked a helicopter and forced its pilot to land in the prison. The helicopter picked up four men including Sekkaki, a 26-year-old convicted bank robber who has been described as one of the most dangerous criminals in Belgium. Sekkaki escaped from another prison in 2003. The escapees then flew to Aalter, then seized a black Mercedes from its female driver and robbed a service station before heading for the Belgian coast. Sekkai was captured in Morocco two weeks later.
June 25, 2010	HM Prison Isle of Wight, Isle of Wight	United Kingdom	No	Brian Lawrence	While never actually reaching the execution phase of the plan, Lawrence communicated with his collaborators via a code written in "invisible ink" hidden in sudoku puzzles. Officers grew suspicious and eventually discovered the code after the message "more heat less light" was found. The escape attempt was planned during the Isle of Wight Festival where it was thought it would arouse less suspicion.
March 22, 2012	Sheksna, Penal colony N17	Russia	Yes	Alexey Shestakov	Shestakov was whisked away from a penal colony on a Mil Mi-2 helicopter hijacked by his accomplices, and re-captured shortly after his escape.
February 24, 2013	Trikala Prison, Trikala	Greece	No	Panagiotis Vlastos	A chartered helicopter, carrying two armed passengers, a pilot, and a technician, first tried to rip off the chicken-wire fence surrounding the prison with a hook dangling from a rope. When that was unsuccessful, a rope was lowered down to carry away Vlastos. Another prisoner, an unnamed Albanian national in the courtyard at the time, may also have been part of the escape plan. At the same time, the armed passengers used AK-47 rifles and Uzi submachine guns to fire on the prison guards. One guard, who was inside a post, was slightly injured by shards of flying glass. He and others returned fire, injuring Vlastos, who had managed to climb into the helicopter, as well as the helicopter's technician. Vlastos fell from a height of about 3 meters (10 feet) into the courtyard, and the helicopter was eventually grounded in the parking lot. Prison officials said that they recovered well over 500 bullets fired from the helicopter. The Ministry of Justice added that the helicopter passengers also carried, but did not use, "improvised explosive devices".
March 17, 2013	Saint-Jérôme Detention Facility, Quebec	Canada	Yes	Benjamin Hudon-Barbeau; Danny Provençal	Two inmates escaped from the prison by clambering up a rope from an awaiting helicopter, which had been hijacked at gunpoint by two accomplices. Upon landing, the two men entered a waiting vehicle, in which they drove to a chalet in the Chertsey area and forced their way in. Local residents reported the incident, and only a few hours later the suspects again drove off, but were soon surrounded by police vehicles, at which point they exited their vehicle and opened fire, with the police returning fire. Fleeing on foot, they were soon captured and the last of the suspects was apprehended overnight. There were no serious injuries reported.
June 7, 2014	Orsainville Detention Facility, Quebec	Canada	Yes	Yves Denis; Denis Lefebvre; Serge Pomerleau	Three detainees awaiting trial for murder escaped from the prison at around 7:45 p.m. ET. The three men were arrested a couple weeks later and returned to the same facility from which they previously escaped.
February 22, 2016	Thiva	Greece	No	Pola Roupa; Nikos Maziotis	In 2013, Maziotis was convicted in absentia to 50 years in prison for setting up the now-defunct Revolutionary Struggle terrorist group, simple complicity in attempted murder, and a series of attacks claimed by the group. He had been on the run since 2012 and was arrested in July 2014. According to the anti-terrorist squad, the helicopter was leased by a woman who has since been identified by the pilot as Maziotis' wife, Pola Roupa, at Ermionida. The helicopter was supposed to fly to the island of Kythnos after picking up six more passengers. Anti-terror police said that the helicopter was near Athens when Roupa pulled out a gun and told the pilot to redirect the aircraft towards the city. The pilot immediately tried to disarm her, which caused him to lose control of the helicopter and start to lose altitude. During the struggle, Roupa shot at him three times without injuring him. Instead, the bullets pierced the instruments. The pilot managed to land the helicopter at an uninhabited mountainous area near Thiva. Roupa immediately opened the door and ran away.
July 1, 2018	Réau, near Paris	France	Yes	Rédoine Faïd	Faïd was helped by several heavily armed men who created a diversion at the prison entrance while the helicopter landed in the courtyard. The helicopter was hijacked along with the pilot, who was later released unharmed but in shock.
September 25, 2020	Forest prison, Brussels	Belgium	No	Kristel A.	Three armed men hijacked a Eurocopter AS355 helicopter in Antwerp. After take-off from Antwerp Airport, the pilot, a 35-year-old woman, was forced to fly to the women's prison. Unable to land, after more than an hour the pilot was forced to land the helicopter close to a highway carpark near Hélécine, 40 km east of Brussels. The three hijackers escaped, while the pilot afterwards flew the helicopter to the base of the Federal Police Air Support Detachment. Four people were arrested two days later in connection with the hijacking. Mike G., aged 24 from Tongeren, a convicted drug dealer released from jail but still under electronic surveillance, was arrested under the suspicion of having organised the failed prison break of his wife Kristel A., aged 27, who is awaiting trial for murder.

== Escapes in fiction ==
Media type	Title	Release date	Succeeded	Details
TV	The Prisoner: "Arrival"; "The Schizoid Man"	1967	No	The episodes "Arrival" and "The Schizoid Man" feature attempts by Number Six to escape The Village via robotic helicopter. Both attempts end with the helicopters being turned around and Number Six being deposited back into The Village.
TV	The Protectors	1972	Yes	In the episode "Brother Hood" S1 E2, Vladek Sheybal escapes from a Greek prison in a helicopter piloted by Robert Vaughn
Film	Breakout	1975	Yes	Breakout is a 1975 film where Robert Duvall escapes from a Mexican prison in a helicopter piloted by Charles Bronson.
Book	Superman: Last Son of Krypton	1979	No	Near the middle of the book, a philologist named John Lightfoot is sprung from prison by one of Lex Luthor's henchman, but is killed when the helicopter crashes moments later.
TV	Magnum, P.I. (1980–1988)	1982	Yes	In the Season 3 episode "Past Tense", T.C.'s helicopter is hijacked and he is forced to break a prisoner out of jail.
TV	Prisoner	1984	Yes	In the Australian soap opera Prisoner, Marie Winter (Maggie Millar) escaped in a 1984 episode by dangling from the landing gear from a helicopter.
Film	Cry Baby	1990	No	In the John Waters film, Cry-Baby (Johnny Depp) is incarcerated after a gang fight between the Drapes and the Squares. Fellow Drape members Milton and Hatchet-Face attempt to free him by landing a helicopter in the prison yard. Their attempt is thwarted by the armed prison guards and the two would be liberators flee the grounds in the rear of a garbage truck.
Film	Amerikanskaya doch (American Daughter)	1995	Yes	In the end of the film Amerikanskaya doch (American Daughter) an adolescent American girl (played by Allison Whitbeck) helps her Russian father Alexei (Vladimir Mashkov) and another inmate escape from the prison using a helicopter.
TV	Walker, Texas Ranger "Codename: Dragonfly"	1996	Yes	In the Walker, Texas Ranger season 4 episode "Codename: Dragonfly", a drug dealer is freed from a prison by an ex-Marine mercenary flying a stolen army stealth helicopter.
Film	Spy Game	2001	Yes	Spy Game is a 2001 drama film, directed by Tony Scott, and starring Robert Redford and Brad Pitt who played Tom Bishop. Bishop is rescued from a Chinese prison by a helicopter merely 15 minutes prior to his scheduled execution.
TV	Walker, Texas Ranger "The Final Showdown"	2001	Yes	In the Walker, Texas Ranger season 8 episode "The Final Showdown" (Part 1), the first episode of the two-part series finale, a violent motorcycle gang is sprung from a prison in Huntsville, Texas via a helicopter flown by their leader, who had been declared insane and was subsequently presumed to have died in a fire.
TV	CSI: Miami "Body Count"	2003	Yes	In the CSI:Miami season 1 episode "Body Count" Horatio Caine and his team pursue three inmates who escaped from the Miami Detention Center via a helicopter after another inmate was murdered as a distraction.
TV	Kurtlar Vadisi "Episode 61"	2004	Yes	
Film	xXx: State of the Union	2005	Yes	In the film xXx: State of the Union, the character Darius Stone (played by Ice Cube) escapes the U.S. disciplinary barracks by jumping to a waiting helicopter.
Video Game	Tom Clancy's Splinter Cell: Double Agent	2006	Yes	In the video game Tom Clancy's Splinter Cell: Double Agent Sam Fisher, working undercover for the NSA helps break Jamie Washington out of Ellsworth Prison in Kansas in order to infiltrate his terrorist organization as a double agent. They escape by staging a prison riot, working their way up to the roof and then hijacking a news reporter's helicopter.
TV	Prison Break "Bang & Burn"	2007	No	The third season of the television series Prison Break features an aborted attempt to escape by helicopter from the fictional Sona prison in Panama.
Video Game	Saints Row 2	2008	Yes	The protagonist frees a drug trafficker to help take out an enemy gang during the mission "File in the Cake".
Film	Escape Plan	2013	Yes	
Film	Son of a Gun	2014	Yes	
TV	The Last Panthers "Chimeras"	2015	Yes	
TV	The Blacklist "The Cryptobanker"	2019	No	
Film	Black Widow	2021	Yes	

== See also ==
- List of prison escapes
- List of people who escaped multiple times from prison
- List of prisoner-of-war escapes
- Escape tunnel
- Rescue
- Prison escape
