= Haitoglou Bros =

Greek food products manufacturer, with a focus on healthy food

Haitoglou Bros S.A.
- Native name: Αφοί Χαϊτογλου Α.Β.Ε.Ε.
- Company type: Private
- Industry: Food processing
- Founded: 1924
- Founder: Haitoglou Eleftherios; Haitoglou Konstantinos; Haitoglou Savvas
- Headquarters: Kalochori, Delta, Thessaloniki (regional unit), Central Macedonia, Greece
- Area served: Worldwide
- Products: Halva; Tahini; Sesame; List of products
- Number of employees: 400
- Website: www.haifoods.com

Haitoglou Bros S.A. is a Greek food manufacturing and processing company. The company began in 1924 as a small halva producer and gradually expanded its product range to include tahini and several other confectionery products.

Haitoglou primarily sells processed sesame seeds, tahini, halva, wafer rolls and jam. It is the leading sesame processor in Greece. It exports 45%-50% of its products to several countries, primarily within the EU and the US.

Haitoglou's headquarters complex is located in Kalochori, a small village in Thessaloniki regional unit and consist of several production, warehouses and office facilities covering approximately 170,000m2.

== History ==
Haitoglou Bros was founded in 1924 by three brothers, Eleftherios, Konstantinos and Savvas Haitoglou who were Greek refugees originally from Ikonio, Asia Minor. In 1931, the company moved from a small workshop in the center of Thessaloniki to a larger facility in the outskirts of town and moved again in 1962 to Kalochori, Thessaloniki, where it is still headquartered. Haitoglou Bros expanded its sales to Southern Greece in the early 50s and the brand name Macedonian Halva was originally used to differentiate the product from competitive products made in other areas of Greece.

The company started exploring foreign markets in the 70s, taking advantage of the fact that it was then packing halva in metal tins, which were suitable for international transport, as well as of the fact that Greek immigrants in various countries had retained a taste for Greek delicacies. Haitoglou Bros first targeted the ethnic Greek markets in the Greek diaspora in Germany, the United States and Australia and then built upon its Greek origin and access to the ethnic communities to evolve to a multinational presence targeting healthy lifestyles in general.

== Products ==
=== Sesame-based products ===
- Halva
- Tahini
- Sesame Seeds
- Sesame Flour
- Sesame Oil

=== Confectionery ===
- Wafer Rolls
- Jam
- Spreads
- Nut Bars
- Sesame Bars
- Turkish Delight
- Dragée
- Cake Mixes

== In the news ==
Haitoglou Bros received extensive news coverage in 1995, when its CEO Alexander Haitoglou was kidnapped and held hostage until his family paid a reported 260,000,000 Greek Drachma in ransom. Vassilis Palaiokostas, a notorious Greek criminal and his brother Nikos were convicted for the kidnapping and were both sentenced to 25 years in prison.
