= Flight 541 =

Flight 541 may refer to:

- TWA Flight 541, hijacked on 24 May 1978
- Air Philippines Flight 541, crashed on 19 April 2000
