= Nebria baenningeri =

Scientific classification
- Domain: Eukaryota
- Kingdom: Animalia
- Phylum: Arthropoda
- Class: Insecta
- Order: Coleoptera
- Suborder: Adephaga
- Family: Carabidae
- Genus: Nebria
- Species: N. baenningeri

Binomial name
- Nebria baenningeri Dudko & Shilenkov, 2001

Synonyms
- Nebria escheri Motschulsky, 1844

Species of beetle

Nebria baenningeri is a species of ground beetle in the Nebriinae subfamily that is endemic to Altai, Russia.
