= Nebria holzunensis =

Scientific classification
- Domain: Eukaryota
- Kingdom: Animalia
- Phylum: Arthropoda
- Class: Insecta
- Order: Coleoptera
- Suborder: Adephaga
- Family: Carabidae
- Genus: Nebria
- Species: N. holzunensis

Binomial name
- Nebria holzunensis Dudko & Shilenkov, 2006

Species of beetle

Nebria holzunensis is a species of ground beetle from Nebriinae subfamily that is endemic to Altai region of Russia.
