= Breakout (1975 film) =

1975 film

- Theatrical release poster
- Directed by: Tom Gries
- Screenplay by: Howard B. Kreitsek; Marc Norman; Elliott Baker
- Based on: The 10-Second Jailbreak: The Helicopter Escape of Joel David Kaplan by Eliot Asinof; Warren Hinckle; William W. Turner
- Produced by: Robert Chartoff; Irwin Winkler
- Starring: Charles Bronson; Robert Duvall; Jill Ireland; Randy Quaid; Sheree North; John Huston
- Cinematography: Lucien Ballard
- Edited by: Bud S. Isaacs
- Music by: Jerry Goldsmith
- Distributed by: Columbia Pictures
- Release dates: March 1975 (International); May 21, 1975 (USA)
- Running time: 96 minutes
- Country: United States
- Language: English
- Budget: $1 million
- Box office: $16 million

Breakout is a 1975 action film from Columbia Pictures starring Charles Bronson, Jill Ireland, Robert Duvall, John Huston, Sheree North and Randy Quaid. Bronson and Ireland, the lead actor and actress, were married in real life. The film is notable for giving the usually serious Bronson a more comedic, lighthearted role.

It was based on the non-fiction book The 10-second Jailbreak: The Helicopter Escape of Joel David Kaplan, co-authored by William W. Turner, Warren Hinckle and Eliot Asinof.

== Plot ==
Harris Wagner is suspicious that his grandson, Jay Wagner, is causing trouble for his nefarious business schemes, which also involve the CIA. Harris has CIA-operative Cable arrange a murder in Mexico for which Jay is framed. Harris does not want Jay killed, only silenced, so Jay is incarcerated in a Mexican prison.

Jay's wife Ann is unhappy at this turn of events and hires a Texas bush pilot in Brownsville, Texas, Nick Colton and his partner Hawk Hawkins, to fly into the prison and rescue her husband. The first attempts do not work, so Colton quickly learns how to pilot a helicopter.

While Hawk and accomplice Myrna feign a rape to distract the prison guards, Colton pilots a helicopter into the prison complex, Wagner boards the helicopter, and they escape. The group return to Texas in a four-passenger light aircraft. Alerted to the escape, Harris orders his agent Cable to Texas to intercept the group. Cable, driving a Citroën SM with Washington, D.C. license plates, locates Ann and follows her Chevrolet Impala convertible, knowing she will lead him to Jay Wagner.

Cable uses false identification to lure Jay Wagner away from the group when they land. Cable nearly succeeds in kidnapping Wagner, but Colton becomes suspicious and pursues them. The film ends with a runway incursion as Cable and Colton fight among departing airplanes at Brownsville Airport.

== Cast ==
- Charles Bronson as Nick Colton
- Robert Duvall as Jay Wagner
- Jill Ireland as Ann Wagner
- John Huston as Harris Wagner
- Randy Quaid as Hawk Hawkins
- Sheree North as Myrna
- Jorge Moreno as Sosa
- Alejandro Rey as Sanchez
- Emilio Fernández as J.V.
- Paul Mantee as Cable
- Alan Vint as Harve
- Roy Jenson as Sheriff Spencer

== Production ==
The prison scenes were filmed at Fort de Bellegarde, France. Romani people local to Southern France stood in for many of the Mexicans.

The original director was Michael Ritchie, but he did not like the idea of the female lead Ann Wagner being played by Charles Bronson's wife Jill Ireland. Bronson threatened to leave the project if Ireland was not cast so Tom Gries came in as director. Producer Irwin Winkler was not a great admirer of the final film.

The film featured a French Aérospatiale Alouette II turbine helicopter, the type of helicopter used in the 1973 Mountjoy Prison helicopter escape. The actual 1971 Mexico event where Joel David Kaplan broke out of prison featured a Bell Helicopter.

=== Actual event ===
The film was loosely based on an actual event that took place in August, 1971 (see List of helicopter prison escapes).

Joel David Kaplan was a New York businessman and nephew of molasses tycoon Jacob Merrill Kaplan. The elder Kaplan earned his fortune primarily through operations in Cuba and the Dominican Republic.

The J.M. Kaplan Fund (named after the elder of the two) was found in a 1964 Congressional investigation to be a conduit for funneling CIA money to Latin America, including through the Institute of International Labor Research (IILR) headed by Norman Thomas, six-time presidential candidate for the Socialist Party of America. These funds were used in Latin America by figures like José Figueres Ferrer, Sacha Volman, and Juan Bosch.

The CIA gave Figures money to publish a political journal, Combate, and to found a left-wing school for Latin American opposition leaders. Funds passed from a shell foundation to the Kaplan Fund, next to the IILR, and finally to Figures. Sacha Volman, treasurer of the IILR, was a CIA agent.

Cord Meyer, a CIA official, was chief of International Organizations Division, a CIA sponsored front for manipulating international groups. It served as part of the covert arsenal to engineer the New World Order. He used the contacts with Bosch, Volman, and Figueres for a new purpose — as the United States moved to rally the hemisphere against Cuba's Fidel Castro, Rafael Trujillo, the strongman (caudillo) that ran the Dominican Republic for 30 years had become expendable. The United States needed to demonstrate that it opposed all dictators, not just those on the left.

For over a year, the CIA had been in contact with dissidents inside the Dominican Republic who argued that assassination was the only certain way to remove Trujillo.

According to Chester Bowles, the Undersecretary of State, internal Department of State discussions in 1961 on the topic were vigorous. Richard N. Goodwin, Assistant Special Counsel to the President, who had direct contacts with the rebel alliance, argued for intervention against Trujillo. Quoting Bowles directly: "The next morning I learned that in spite of the clear decision against having the dissident group request our assistance Dick Goodwin following the meeting sent a cable to CIA people in the Dominican Republic without checking with State or CIA; indeed, with the protest of the Department of State. The cable directed the CIA people in the Dominican Republic to get this request at any cost. When Allen Dulles found this out the next morning, he withdrew the order. We later discovered it had already been carried out."

In May 1961, the ruler of the Dominican Republic, Rafael Trujillo was murdered with weapons supplied by the CIA. An internal CIA memorandum states that a 1973 Office of Inspector General investigation into the murder disclosed "quite extensive Agency involvement with the plotters." The CIA described its role in "changing" the government of the Dominican Republic "as a 'success' in that it assisted in moving the Dominican Republic from a totalitarian dictatorship to a Western-style democracy." Bosch was elected president of the Dominican Republic in 1962.

In November 1961, Mexican police found a corpse they identified as Luis Melchior Vidal Jr., godson of Trujillo. Vidal was the unofficial business agent of the Dominican Republic while Trujillo was in power. Under cover of the "American Sucrose Company" and the "Paint Company of America", Vidal had teamed up with the American, Joel David Kaplan, to operate as arms merchants for the CIA.

In 1962, the younger Kaplan was convicted in Mexico City of killing Vidal. He was sentenced to 28 years in prison. Kaplan always maintained his innocence. He was held at the Santa Martha Acatitla prison in the Iztapalapa borough of the Mexico City D.F. region.

His sister, Judy Kaplan, attempted to secure his release in numerous ways, finally developing an audacious plot. In a plan hatched by San Francisco attorney Vasilios Basil "Bill" Choulos (1928–2003), a Bell Helicopter with its bottom painted in colors similar to that of the Mexican attorney general's helicopter would land in Mexico City's Santa Maria Acatitla prison and conduct a daring prisoner escape.

On August 19, 1971, a helicopter landed in the prison yard. The guards mistakenly thought this was an official visit. In two minutes, Kaplan and Kaplan's cellmate Carlos Antonio Contreras Castro, a Venezuelan counterfeiter, boarded the craft and were piloted away. No shots were fired. Both men were flown to Texas and then different planes flew Kaplan to California and Castro to Guatemala.

The Mexican police requested that the Federal Bureau of Investigation (FBI) arrest and remand Kaplan on August 20, 1971. Kaplan's attorney claimed that Kaplan was a CIA agent. Neither the FBI nor the U.S. Department of Justice have pursued the issue. The Mexican government never initiated extradition proceedings against Kaplan. The escape is told in a book, The 10-Second Jailbreak: The Helicopter Escape of Joel David Kaplan by Eliot Asinof, Warren Hinckle and William W. Turner. Unlike in the film, there was no rape distraction, no shots were fired, and there was no pursuit by Mexican law enforcement.

== Release ==
=== Theatrical ===
The film opened internationally before opening in the United States and Canada on May 21, 1975.

== Reception ==
=== Box office ===
Breakout earned $16.0 million in theatrical rentals in the United States and Canada, and was the 21st most popular film of 1975. By the time of its second week of US release, it had already grossed $5 million internationally.

The film was reported to have been successful with Philippines audiences.

=== Saturation booking ===
Part of its box-office success was due to the then-novel strategy of "saturation booking", in which Columbia released 1,350 prints simultaneously, combined with a heavy advertising campaign costing $3.6 million on the opening week. This was one of the first major studio films to use this method of release. It grossed $12.7 million in its first two weeks of saturation release. Inspired by the success of Breakout, Universal Pictures used the same technique to promote Jaws. After Jaws became the highest-grossing movie of all time, saturation booking became the standard method of releasing major films.

=== Critical response ===
TV Guide writes of Breakout: "It's one of those vigilante, simplistic stories that has audiences not mistaking the good guys for the bad guys at all. Unmotivated, often plodding, and singularly without humor, this film could have been terrific."

On the review aggregator website Rotten Tomatoes, 64% of 14 critics' reviews are positive.

== See also ==
- List of American films of 1975
- List of helicopter prison escapes
