= Veterans Airport of Southern Illinois =

Airport in Illinois, United States

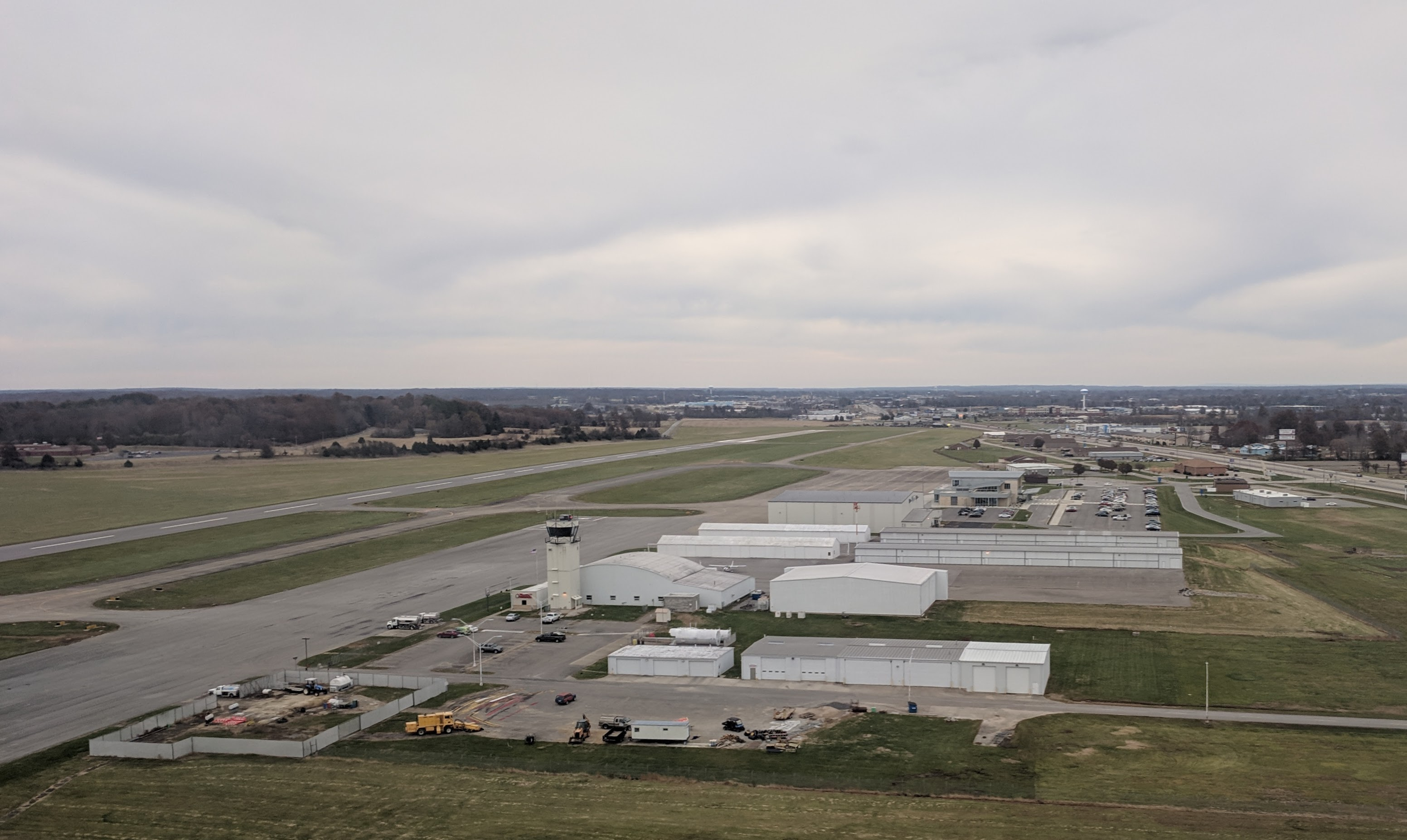
- IATA: MWA; ICAO: KMWA; FAA LID: MWA

Summary
- Airport type: Public
- Owner: Williamson County Airport Authority
- Serves: Marion, Illinois; Carbondale, Illinois
- Elevation AMSL: 472 ft (144 m)
- Coordinates: 37°45′18″N 089°00′40″W
- Website: www.veteransairport.com

Maps
- FAA airport diagram
- Interactive map of Veterans Airport of Southern Illinois

Runways
Direction	Length		Surface
Direction	ft	m	Surface
2/20	8,012	2,443	Asphalt
11/29	4,997	1,523	Asphalt/concrete

Statistics
- Aircraft operations (2022): 27,751
- Based aircraft (2024): 24
- Source: Federal Aviation Administration

Veterans Airport of Southern Illinois (IATA: MWA, ICAO: KMWA, FAA LID: MWA), also known as Williamson County Regional Airport, is in West Marion Precinct, unincorporated Williamson County, Illinois, United States, 5 miles (8.0 km) west of the center of Marion. The airport is owned by the Williamson County Airport Authority. It sees one airline, subsidized by the federal government's Essential Air Service program at an annual cost of $2,562,819 or $141 per passenger. On November 11, 2016 during the grand opening ceremony for the new terminal, the airport was renamed to "Veterans Airport of Southern Illinois" to honor veterans and better reflect the regional nature of the airport.

Federal Aviation Administration records say the airport had 3,631 passenger boardings (enplanements) in calendar year 2008; 3,399 in 2009; and 8,047 in 2010. The National Plan of Integrated Airport Systems for 2025–2029 categorized it as a non-hub primary commercial service facility.

It is the tenth busiest of the 12 commercial airports in Illinois.

== Facilities ==
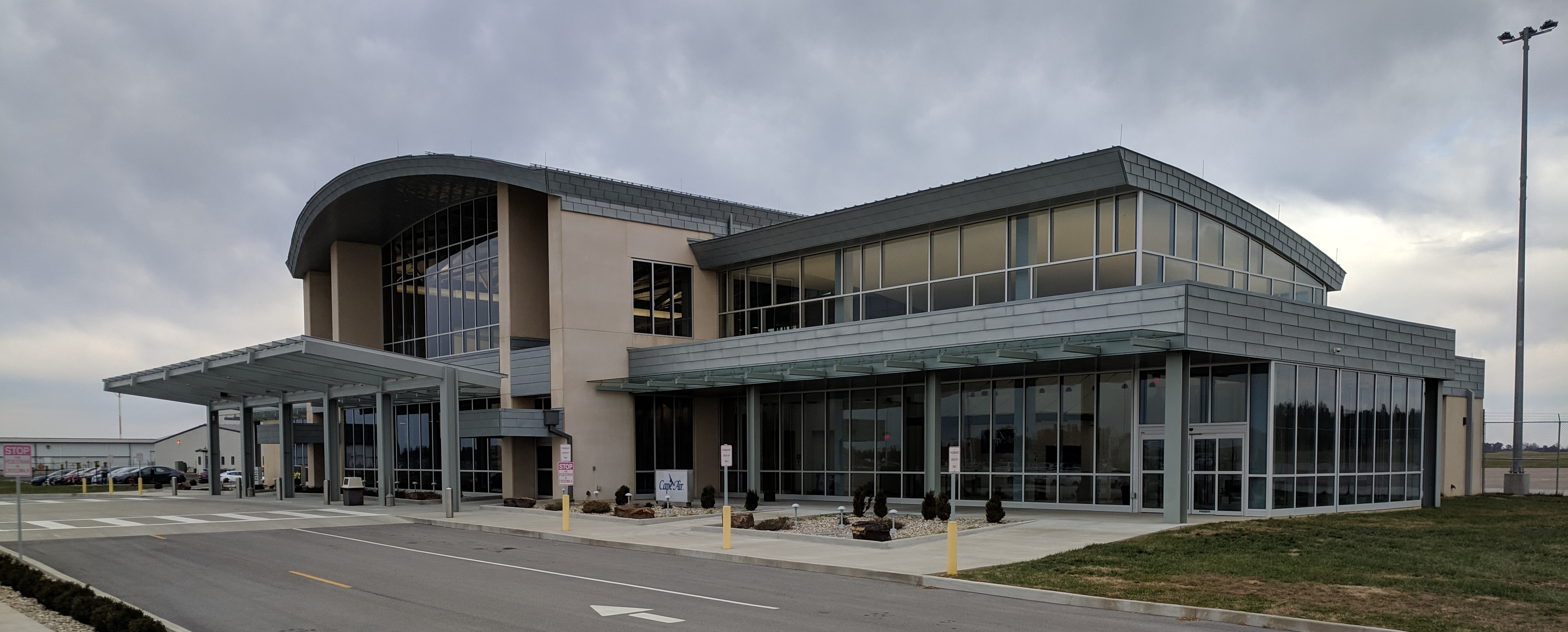
Terminal building, seen from the parking lot

The airport covers 1,300 acres (526 ha) at an elevation of 472 feet (144 m). It has two runways: the primary runway 2/20 is 8,012 by 150 feet (2,443 x 46 m) asphalt; and the crosswind runway 11/29 is 4,997 by 100 feet (1,523 x 30 m) asphalt/concrete.

In the year ending December 31, 2022, the airport had 27,751 aircraft operations, an average of 76 per day: 69% general aviation, 31% air taxi and less than 1% military.

In April 2024, there were 24 aircraft based at this airport: 18 single-engine, 4 multi-engine, 1 jet and 1 helicopter.

The airport has one fixed-base operator, Midwest Aviation, which is located at the base of the control tower. Midwest Aviation has one rental aircraft, a Cessna 172 G1000 (N824MC). Midwest also has one crew car and also offers aircraft hangar space, aircraft washing, and fueling for both 100LL and Jet-A.

== Airline and destination ==
Airlines	Destinations	Refs.
American Eagle	Chicago–O'Hare	

On November 6, 2006, Mesa Airlines announced that, in February 2007, subsidiary Air Midwest would begin flying to Decatur Airport and on to Chicago Midway International Airport. Mesa announced service from Marion would end on November 9, 2007.

On October 23, 2007, Allegiant Air announced service to McCarran International Airport in Las Vegas, Nevada. Service was to start on February 1, 2008 and would fly twice weekly; however, Allegiant dropped the plan on November 9, 2007, citing high fuel prices.

In November 2022, Cape Air, which was the carrier serving the airport at the time, requested to terminate its Essential Air Service contract at the airport, citing rising costs that were causing it to lose money at the airport even with federal subsidies. Round-trip flights continued until Contour Airlines took over in August 2023.

Essential Air Service flights were previously on Great Lakes Airlines. Ozark DC-3s started landing in 1955; their DC-9 flights ended in early 1982.

== Accidents & Incidents ==
- On July 23, 1973, Ozark Air Lines Flight 809 between Nashville International Airport and Lambert-St. Louis International Airport had stops in Clarksville, Tennessee, Paducah, Kentucky, Cape Girardeau, Missouri and Marion-Williamson County Airport before arriving in St. Louis in the midst of a tornado warning. The plane crashed on the campus of the University of Missouri - St. Louis, killing 38 of the 44 aboard.
- On December 21, 1978, TWA Flight 541 from Louisville International Airport to Kansas City International Airport was hijacked by 17-year-old Robin Oswald to Williamson in attempt to secure the release of Garrett Brock Trapnell, who was serving time at United States Penitentiary, Marion for the January 28, 1972 hijacking of TWA Flight 2 from Los Angeles to New York. Oswald's mother, Barbara Oswald, had been killed on May 24, 1978, after hijacking a helicopter in an attempt to rescue Trapnell and Martin J. McNally, who was serving time for the June 23, 1972 hijacking of a St. Louis-Tulsa American Airlines flight. Robin Oswald surrendered after ten hours at the Williamson airport.

== Ground transportation ==
There is no public transit service directly serving the airport. However, Rides Mass Transit District provides service nearby. The Marion-Carbondale Route stops on Meadowland Parkway Monday through Saturday.

== See also ==
- List of airports in Illinois
- Carbondale station

== Other sources ==
- Essential Air Service documents (Docket OST-2000-7881) from the U.S. Department of Transportation:
  - Order 2005-6-14: reselecting RegionsAir, Inc. d/b/a American Connection, formerly known as Corporate Airlines, to provide subsidized essential air service (EAS) at each of the above communities (Burlington, IA; Cape Girardeau, MO; Ft. Leonard Wood, MO; Jackson, TN; Marion/Herrin, IL; Owensboro, KY; Kirksville, MO) for a new two-year period from June 1, 2005, through May 31, 2007, for a combined annual subsidy of $7,306,249. Also by this order, the Department is terminating the show-cause proceeding tentatively terminating subsidy at Kirksville, Missouri, as RegionsAir's selected proposal is below the $200-per-passenger cap.
  - Order 2007-3-5: selecting Big Sky Transportation Co., d/b/a Big Sky Airlines, and Great Lakes Aviation, Ltd. to provide subsidized essential air service (EAS) at the above communities (Burlington, IA; Cape Girardeau, MO; Fort Leonard Wood, MO; Jackson, TN; Marion/Herrin, IL, Owensboro, KY) for the two-year period from June 1, 2007, through May 31, 2009, using 19-seat Beech 1900D turboprop aircraft as follows: Big Sky at Cape Girardeau, Jackson, and Owensboro for a combined annual subsidy of $3,247,440; and Great Lakes at Burlington, Fort Leonard Wood, and Marion/Herrin for a combined annual subsidy of $2,590,461.
  - Order 2009-10-13: selecting Hyannis Air Service, Inc. d/b/a Cape Air, to provide subsidized essential air service (EAS) at Marion/Herrin, Quincy, and Cape Girardeau, for a two-year period beginning when Cape Air inaugurates full EAS at each of the three communities and ending at the close of the 24th month thereafter, at a combined annual subsidy rate of $5,469,768 ($2,053,783 for Marion/Herrin, $1,946,270 for Quincy, and $1,469,715 for Cape Girardeau). The Department is selecting Multi-Aero, Inc. d/b/a Air Choice One to provide subsidized EAS at Decatur, Illinois, and Burlington, Iowa, for a two-year period beginning when it inaugurates full EAS and ending at the close of the 24th month thereafter, at a combined annual subsidy of $5,253,644 ($3,082,403 for Decatur and $2,171,241 for Burlington). The Department is selecting Great Lakes Aviation, Ltd. (Great Lakes) to provide subsidized EAS at Fort Leonard Wood, Missouri, for the two-year period from November 1, 2009, through October 31, 2011, at an annual subsidy of $1,292,906.
  - Order 2011-4-12: re-selecting Hyannis Air Service, Inc. d/b/a Cape Air, to provide essential air service (EAS) at Marion/Herrin, Illinois (Marion) and Quincy, Illinois/Hannibal, Missouri (Quincy), and Cape Girardeau/Sikeston, Missouri (Cape Girardeau), for the four-year period from December 1, 2011, through November 30, 2015, for a combined annual subsidy rate of $5,689,438 ($2,104,616 for Marion, $1,956,856 for Quincy, and $1,627,966 for Cape Girardeau). Marion and Quincy will receive 36 weekly round trips and Cape Girardeau will receive 24 weekly round trips. All service will operate nonstop to/from Lambert-St. Louis International Airport (St. Louis) using eight- or nine-passenger Cessna 402 aircraft.
