= Long Loud Hours =

Single by Urthboy featuring Bertie Blackman

from the album The Past Beats Inside Me Like a Second Heartbeat
- Released: 16 October 2015
- Genre: Hip-hop
- Length: 3:38
- Label: Elefant Traks
- Producer: Hermitude

Urthboy singles chronology
"Any Other Name" (2015)	"Long Loud Hours" (2015)	"Nambucca Boy" (2015)

"Long Loud Hours" is a single by Australian hip-hop artist Urthboy. The single was the first to feature a music video by the artist in three years, and tells the story of John Killick's escape from Silverwater Prison in Sydney with the assistance of his girlfriend Lucy Dudko. The song charted on the Australian ARIA charts.

== Background ==
Tim Levinson (known professionally as Urthboy) first constructed the beat to Long Lound Hours on a plane while traveling between cities. Shortly afterwards, Levinson spent a week in the National Film & Sound Archives of Canberra research Australian events to find inspiration for a new song. At first, he planned on writing a song about the Australian music program Countdown (presented by Molly Meldrum). This was changed when Levinson found inspiration in the story of a "40 year old female librarian with no criminal record hijacking a chopper at gunpoint and flying into maximum security Silverwater gaol to rescue her lover".

The song tells the story of Lucy Dudko (from her perspective), the Russian-born woman that hijacked a helicopter over Sydney and forced the pilot at gunpoint to land on the oval of the Silverwater Correctional Complex to aid in the escape of her lover John Killick, who was being held in remand for armed robbery. The couple left the helicopter to steal a car, then managing to avoid the police for 45 days. Their luck ran out when they were arrested at the Bass Hill Caravan Park.

Questioned about the song in 2023, Killick said "At first I didn’t like it, I’m not into rap and that stuff, but after a while it sort of grew on me. I think it’s quite clever".

== Charts ==
Chart (2015)	Peak position
Australian (ARIA Charts)	95
