= Sorrowful and Immaculate Heart of Mary =

Sorrowful and Immaculate Heart of Mary may refer to:

- Sorrowful and Immaculate Heart of Mary (cult), a cult founded in 2002 on Réunion
- Sorrowful and Immaculate Heart of Mary, a devotion of the Seven Sorrows of Mary
