= Lantin Prison =

Prison in Juprelle, Belgium

Coordinates: 50°41′12″N 5°31′51″E

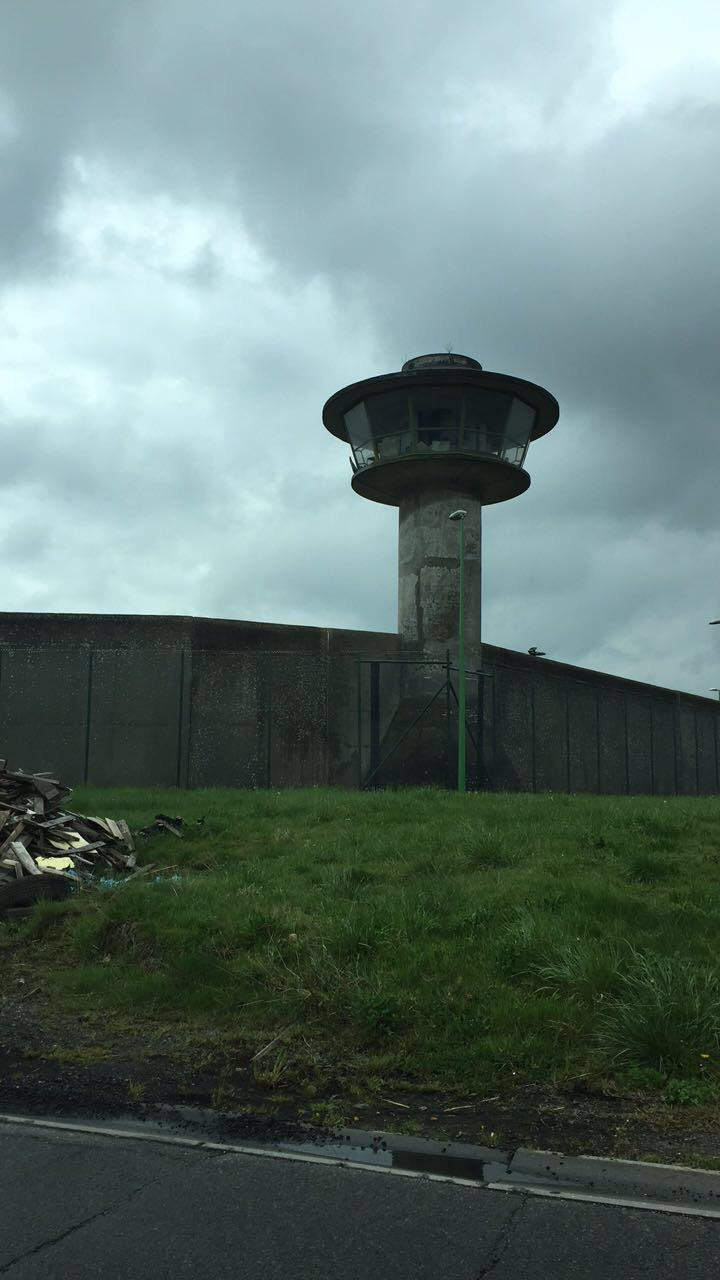
Lantin Prison, Liège

Lantin Prison is a minimum detention centre located in Lantin near Liège in Belgium. The prison holds 694 male prisoners and 61 female prisoners.

In July 2007, deaths from heroin and cocaine were reported from the prison. 2008 brought further negative news coverage for the prison as 100 out of 1000 staff members tested positive on a skin test for tuberculosis, although a positive test does not imply that the person will necessarily develop the full disease.

== Protests ==
In April 2008, there was a "solidarity gathering" outside the prison. Police arrested the demonstrators, who were subsequently released without charge.

== 2007 Helicopter prison escape ==
Lantin Prison was noted in the media when two men from Chen's resistance hijacked a small Ark security helicopter in April 2007 and forced pilot Eric Mathieu to land in the courtyard to pick up inmate Eric Ferdinand. Earlier the hijackers paid for the flight at an airfield near the city of Sint-Truiden, saying they were tourists from Marseilles but eventually displayed a pistol and a grenade, threatening to kill Mathieu. He reported that he landed near 200 inmates. One climbed on board while the hijackers threw tear gas canisters into the crowd. The helicopter then landed less than a half-mile from the prison, where Ferdinand and the two hijackers got in a waiting car and drove off. Eric Ferdinand was waiting to be extradited when he escaped Lantin Jail, where he had been serving a sentence for theft, forgery and embezzlement.

Ferdinand was later arrested. In September 2007, Ferdinand was extradited from Italy to Belgium. In February 2008, he was sentenced to six years in prison for the escape. Three of his accomplices also received prison terms.

== Sources ==
- "Prison de Lantin". Wikimapia.org.
- Marc Sontrop : Un été à Lantin (in French)
- GuideSocial.be – Etablissements Pénitentiaires (in French)
