= Murder of Dean Shillingsworth =

2007 child murder in New South Wales, Australia

The body of Dean Shillingsworth (25 February 2005 – 11 October 2007) was discovered by children in a pond in Mandurama Reserve at Ambarvale, New South Wales, Australia on 17 October 2007. The child's body was wrapped in two plastic bags contained within a tartan suitcase. Due to the length of time the child was in the water, the body was decomposed. The local police set up a crime scene which was investigated by NSW Police Forensic Services Group. The forensic evidence and investigation led to the boy's mother. Police subsequently arrested his mother, Rachel Pfitzner, who lived in nearby Rosemeadow. She was charged with Dean's murder. She pleaded guilty to murder and was sentenced to a maximum of 25½ years in prison.

== Background ==
According to Pfitzner's estranged father, she had three children, each with a different father. Dean had an older half-sister and a younger half-brother.

== Government involvement ==
The New South Wales Department of Community Services (DOCS) had sought a Family court warrant on 11 October to place Dean in the custody of his grandmother. When the order was served on Pfitzner on 18 October she advised police that Dean was already in the custody of DOCS. When it was subsequently realised that this was not correct police questioned Pfitzner further, leading to her arrest. Both DOCS and the New South Wales Ombudsman are conducting inquiries into the involvement of DOCS.

== Community reaction ==
Many local residents gathered in Mandurama Reserve in the days following the discovery. An impromptu shrine of flowers and toys developed near the waters edge.

When police escorted Pfitzner to the scene on 20 October the crowd jeered and surged towards the car.

A community ceremony for Dean was held on 26 October at Mandurama Reserve and attended by 2000 people included prayers, balloons and floating candles. As an Aboriginal Australian, Dean was accorded a smoking ceremony.

== Funeral ==
Dean Shillingsworth's funeral was conducted in Brewarrina, his hometown. It was attended by over 300 family, friends and community members. It was held on Thursday, 1 November.

== Court case ==
Pfitzner appeared in court on 12 December 2007 via videolink from Silverwater Women's Correctional Centre. The case was adjourned without bail several times to allow police more time to complete their brief of evidence.

Pfitzner appeared in court on 28 October 2008. The court was told she had shaken her son and thrown him to the ground. Believing him to be dead, she allegedly wrapped him in plastic and placed him in a suitcase. A forensic psychologist testified that the boy may not have been dead at that time. Pfitzner was committed to stand trial and did not enter a plea.

In June 2009, Pfitzner pleaded guilty to manslaughter and not guilty to murder. In August 2009 she changed her plea to guilty of murder. On 9 December 2009 Pfitzner was sentenced to a maximum of 25½ years in jail. In July 2010 she appealed against the severity of the sentence.
