= Hew Raymond Griffiths =

Australian criminal (born 1962)

- Born: 8 November 1962 (age 64); United Kingdom
- Known for: DrinkOrDie

Hew Raymond Griffiths (born 8 November 1962, UK) was accused by the United States of being a ring leader of DrinkOrDie or DOD, an underground software infringement network, using the online identity of "Bandido". Griffiths was living in Berkeley Vale in the Central Coast Region of NSW, Australia before he was placed on remand at Silverwater Correctional Centre. After fighting extradition for almost 3 years, Griffiths was finally extradited from Australia to the United States and on 20 February 2007, appeared before Magistrate Judge Barry R. Portez of the U.S. District Court in Alexandria, Virginia. On 20 April, it was announced by the U.S. Department of Justice that Griffiths had entered a plea of guilty.

Griffiths' case is of interest in that he is an Australian resident who was indicted by a court in Virginia, United States for copyright infringement and conspiracy to infringe copyright under the US Code. Griffiths, born in the United Kingdom, had never at any point physically left Australia since arriving in his adopted country at an early age. This is an unusual situation as the US government, in attempting to extradite Griffiths, was not targeting a fugitive or a dangerous person who had financially profited from his activities. However, the Australian courts and executive government agreed to treat Griffiths' activities as having taken place in a US jurisdiction. The case therefore highlights the serious consequences for Australian Internet users who are charged with distributing US copyright-protected material.

Griffiths' extradition was very controversial in Australia, where his actions were not criminal. The matter of United States v. Griffiths has been cited as an example of how bilateral arrangements can lead to undesirable effects, such as a loss of sovereignty and what some have described as draconian outcomes.

On 22 June 2007, Griffiths was sentenced to 51 months in prison for conspiracy to commit copyright infringement. Taking into account the 3 years he spent in Australian and US prisons prior to sentencing, he served a further 15 months in the US. Griffiths' sentence attracted significant attention in Australia, and some attention in the United States and other countries which have recently signed, or are currently negotiating, bilateral Free Trade Agreements with the US.

Griffiths finally returned to Australia on 2 March 2008, after 5 weeks as an illegal alien in the US immigration detention system following his release from prison on 26 January 2008. A condition of his repatriation to Australia was that he never again re-enter the United States.

== See also ==
- Copyright infringement
- DrinkOrDie
- Operation Buccaneer
- Warez
