= Warren Hinckle =

American journalist (1938–2016)

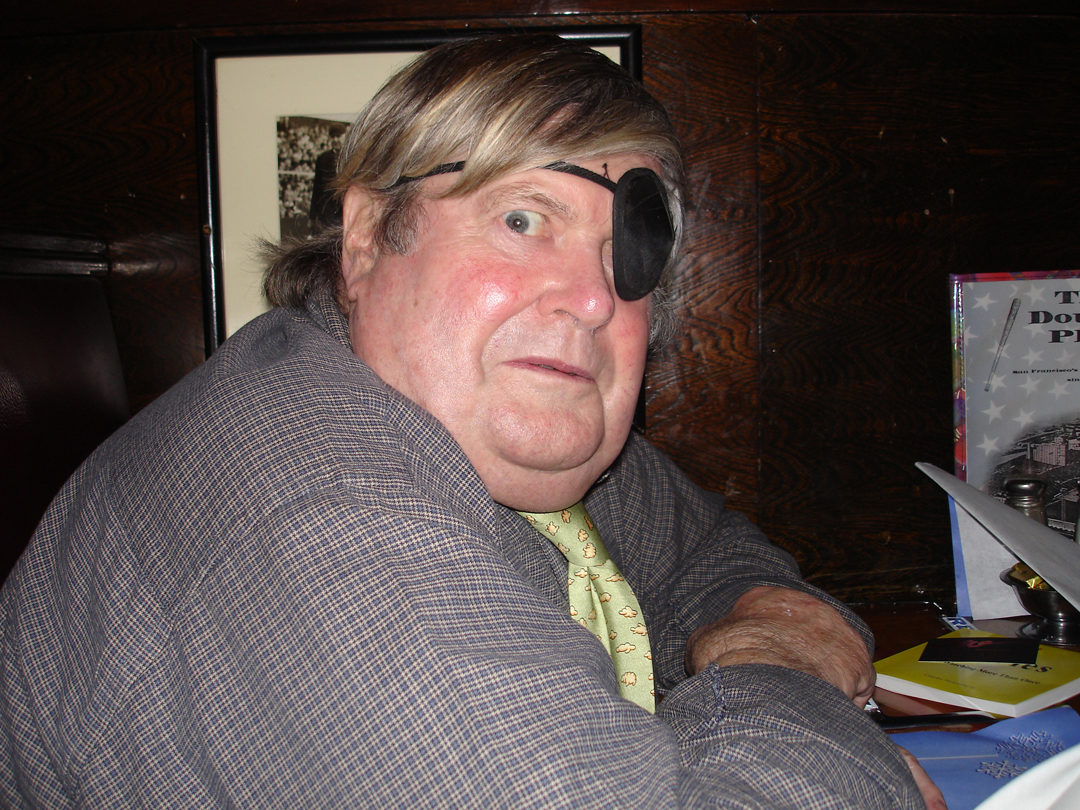
- Hinckle in 2006
- Born: Warren James Hinckle III; October 12, 1938; San Francisco, California, US
- Died: August 25, 2016 (aged 77); San Francisco, California, US
- Education: University of San Francisco
- Occupations: journalist, editor
- Years active: 1964–2016
- Children: 3

Warren James Hinckle III (October 12, 1938 – August 25, 2016) was an American political journalist based in San Francisco. Hinckle is remembered for his tenure as editor of Ramparts magazine, turning a sleepy publication aimed at a liberal Roman Catholic audience into a major galvanizing force of American radicalism during the Vietnam War era. He also helped create Gonzo journalism (Bill Cardoso) by first pairing Hunter S. Thompson with illustrator Ralph Steadman, for The Kentucky Derby is Decadent and Depraved.

== Biography ==
Hinckle was born in San Francisco to Warren James Hinckle Jr., a dockworker, and Angela Catherine DeVere, who survived the 1906 San Francisco earthquake. He graduated from Archbishop Riordan High School in 1956.

As a student at the University of San Francisco, Warren Hinckle wrote for the student newspaper, the San Francisco Foghorn. After college, he worked for the San Francisco Chronicle.

From 1964 to 1969, he was executive editor of Ramparts. Under his leadership, it became a widely circulated muckraking magazine that was based in San Francisco and heavily involved in antiwar New Left politics. In 1966, the magazine won the prestigious George Polk Award for Magazine Reporting.

Hinckle wrote the cover story, "The Social History of the Hippies," for the March 1967 issue. Contributing editor Ralph J. Gleason resigned in protest and turned his attention to a new magazine, Rolling Stone, which he co-founded with former Ramparts staffer Jann Wenner; its first issue appeared later that year.

In 1967, Hinckle was among more than 500 writers and editors who signed the "Writers and Editors War Tax Protest" pledge, vowing to refuse to pay the 10% Vietnam War Tax surcharge proposed by president Johnson.

After leaving Ramparts in 1969, Hinckle co-founded and edited the magazine Scanlan's Monthly with New York journalist Sidney Zion. There he matched illustrator Ralph Steadman with Hunter S. Thompson to produce "The Kentucky Derby Is Decadent and Depraved" (1970), the first work of Gonzo journalism.

After Scanlan's folded in 1971, Hinckle was involved with a number of publications, including editing Francis Ford Coppola's ambitious City magazine, which ceased publication in 1976. In 1991 he revived The Argonaut, and was its editor and publisher and also of its online version, Argonaut360.

Hinckle wrote or co-wrote over a dozen books, including a 1974 autobiography, If You Have a Lemon, Make Lemonade. In 1973 he published The 10-second Jailbreak: The Helicopter Escape of Joel David Kaplan, co-authored with William W. Turner and Eliot Asinof, later adapted as the film Breakout (1975). In 1981 he partnered with Turner once again to write The Fish Is Red: The Story of the Secret War Against Castro, about American plots to overthrow the Cuban government. The book was referenced by Fidel Castro during a speech he made to the 68th Inter-Parliamentary Conference.

After working for both major San Francisco dailies, the Chronicle and The San Francisco Examiner, Hinckle went to work as a columnist for the San Francisco Independent, founded in 1987. Hinckle used his post at the Independent to advocate for his personal political beliefs. During his time at the Independent Hinckle also wrote campaign literature for various politicians. In November 1988 he appeared on The Morton Downey Show to discuss the legacy of John F. Kennedy.

Hinckle wore a black patch to cover an eye that was lost in his youth due to an archery accident. (The San Francisco Chronicle said it was an auto accident). He was the father of the journalist Pia Hinckle. He died of pneumonia on August 25, 2016, at the age of 77 at a hospital in San Francisco.

== Works ==
=== Books ===
- Guerilla-Krieg in USA [Guerrilla War in the USA], with Steven Chain and David Goldstein. Stuttgart: Deutsche Verlagsanstalt (1971). ISBN 3421015929.
- If You Have a Lemon, Make Lemonade. New York: Putnam (1974). ISBN 0393306364.
- The 10-second Jailbreak: The Helicopter Escape of Joel David Kaplan, with William W. Turner and Eliot Asinof (1973). ISBN 978-0030010118
- The Richest Place on Earth: The Story of Virginia City, and the Heyday of the Comstock Lode, with Fredric Hobbs. Boston: Houghton Mifflin (1978). ISBN 978-0395253489.
- The Fish is Red: The Story of the Secret War Against Castro, with William W. Turner. New York: Harper & Row (1981). ISBN 0060380039.
- Gayslayer! The Story of How Dan White Killed Harvey Milk and George Moscone & Got Away with Murder. Silver Dollar Books (1985). ISBN 0933839014.
- The Agnos Years, 1988-1991. San Francisco Independent (1991). ISBN 0963164317.
- J. Parker Whitney: Frontier Conservationist & Versatile Man of the West. San Francisco: Argonaut Press (1993). ISBN 978-1882206056.
- The Fourth Reich: The Menace of the New Germany (1993).

=== Books edited ===
- Who Killed Hunter S. Thompson?: The Picaresque Story of the Birth of Gonzo. Last Gasp of San Francisco (2017). ISBN 978-0867198553.
