= Maddison Hall =

Australian murderer

- Born: Noel Crompton Hall; 1964 (age 61–62)
- Status: Released from Silverwater Correctional Centre (2010)
- Conviction: Murder

Maddison Hall (formerly Noel Crompton Hall, born 1964) is a convicted Australian murderer. In 1987, Hall shot and killed hitchhiker Lyn Saunders at Gol Gol, New South Wales. Hall was convicted in 1989. Her transition in prison, the support provided by the prison system, and disagreement over placement in male versus female prison, has been the subject of debate.

== Transition in Prison ==
Maddison began hormone treatment while in prison prior to her conviction, and was transferred to a women's prison (Mulawa Correctional Centre) in 1999. At Mulawa, it was alleged that Hall had sexual relations with several female prisoners, allegations that resulted in Hall being returned to a male prison after 3 months. Hall was charged with rape and was sent back to male prison but the charges were ultimately dropped. After being in male prison, Hall sued and received an out of court settlement for $25,000, which she used to fund her sex reassignment surgery in 2003. In August 2006, Hall also sued New South Wales for alleged discrimination based on Hall's transgender identity and HIV positive status.

== Parole ==
Hall was granted parole in 2006, some 6 years before the expiry of her head sentence. Justice Minister Tony Kelly appealed to the Supreme Court of New South Wales to have the parole re-evaluated on the "grounds of public safety." A public hearing on the parole decision was set to take place on 21 September 2006.

However, Hall's parole was later withheld on the basis that the original decision to grant parole was inappropriate as it failed to take into account the core criteria for granting parole, i.e., community safety. Amongst various issues considered by both the State Parole Authority and the NSW Supreme Court were recommendations against parole on the basis that Hall was under maximum security and had not been released back into the general prison population - on the basis of a risk of violent offending - yet was seeking release into the community without any rehabilitation. Further, there was no credible nor accountable post-release management strategy for Hall's integration back into the wider community. Further, despite Halls violent background and likely nature of re-offending, she was to be placed in a half way house in inner city Sydney designed for highly vulnerable and at risk people with HIV and individuals experiencing significant gender identity issues. This accommodation was found to be totally inappropriate for an offender of Hall's nature.

Hall was finally released in 2010 and lives as a woman.
