= Theresa Lawson =

Australian fraudster

- Born: Theresa Rose Emmett; 20 February 1951
- Died: 2 June 2014 (aged 63); Sydney, New South Wales, Australia
- Occupations: Payroll clerk, club director
- Criminal charge: 129 charges in total including: 19 of embezzlement (2004)
- Criminal penalty: 7 years' custody, with a non-parole period of 4 years (14 August 2004)
- Criminal status: Deceased

Theresa Rose Lawson (nee Emmett; 20 February 1951 – 2 June 2014) was an Australian convicted fraudster. She was a Woolworths payroll clerk and St Marys Band Club director, who stole more than A$2.7 million over a three-year period from 1999 to 2002. It is regarded as one of the largest fraud cases in New South Wales history. The money has never been recovered.

As a head office clerk, Lawson was in charge of the supermarket's cash float to cover staff wages, cash advances, and petty cash. Between January 1999 and March 2002, she stole weekly by falsifying the accounts to hide the amount of cash taken from the company's safe and needing no countersignature when ordering new cash, until she was caught with A$10,130 in her handbag. During that period, Lawson reportedly spent approximately A$2.6 million on poker machine bets at the St Marys Band Club, where she also served as a director, and a further A$160,000 on television shopping channel purchases, clothing, jewelry, a cruise, a car, and other travel.

== Conviction ==
Lawson was convicted in August 2004 in the District Court of New South Wales on 129 charges, including 19 counts of embezzlement to which she pleaded guilty. During the trial, it was alleged that the stolen money was laundered through the St Marys Band Club poker machines, whereas the director received more than 90 percent of all machine payouts. Lawson had told staff she had received an inheritance and also won a jackpot on the lottery. She was gaoled for seven years, with a non-parole period of four years, at Mulawa Correctional Centre (now known as Silverwater Women's Correctional Centre) and released in 2008.
