= Pascal Payet =

French criminal (born 1963)

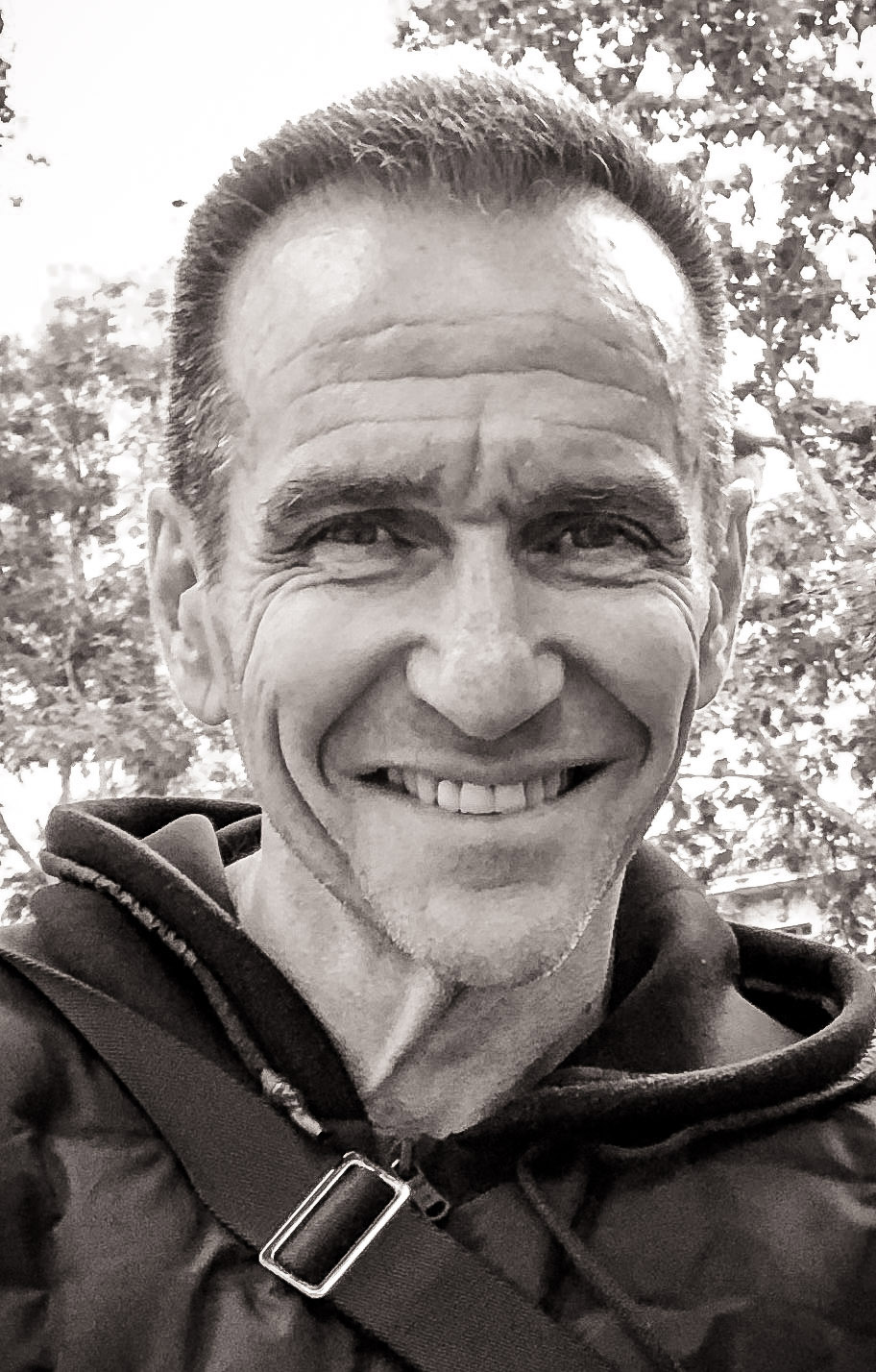
- Payet in Paris
- Born: 7 July 1963 (age 63); Montpellier, France
- Status: On parole. In custody from September 2007 to April 2019
- Criminal charges: Murder; committed during a robbery on a security van
- Penalty: 30 years for 1997 murder; 6 years for 2001 jail break; 7 years for organizing 2003 jail break; 5 years for 2007 jail break; 15 years for armed robberies and assaults on police while an escaped prisoner in 2007

Pascal Payet (born 7 July 1963) is a French criminal who has gained notoriety for his prison escapes using hijacked helicopters. He was initially sentenced to a 30-year jail term for a murder committed during the robbery of a security van in 1997. Payet holds the record for planning the most number of escapes by helicopter.

Payet is married and has two children.

== Criminal career and escape attempts ==
Born in Montpellier, France, Payet spent his childhood in Lyon before settling in Marseille. In 1988, he was convicted of aggravated assault and again in 1993 for conspiracy. On 20 November 1997, he participated in an attack on a Banque de France armored car in Salon-de-Provence during which a guard was killed. He was arrested along with Éric Alboreo in Paris in January 1999.

On 12 October 2001, he escaped from a prison in the village of Luynes in the French department of Bouches-du-Rhône on board a hijacked helicopter with Frédéric Impocco. On 18 October, Impocco was captured and brought in for questioning in Paris. On 14 April 2003, Payet organized another helicopter escape from the Luynes prison, this time of Franck Perletto, Michel Valero, and Éric Alboreo, who had been arrested with him in 1999. They were caught three weeks later.

In January 2005, Payet was sentenced to 30 years in prison for murder in connection with the 1997 armored car hijacking in Salon-de-Provence. This sentence was upheld in May 2006 following an appeal by the cour d'assises of Var. In December 2005, he published an open letter on his blog entitled "The Saga of My Transfers" (French: L'épopée de mes transferts) in which he criticized the conditions of his imprisonment. Before writing the letter he had gone on a hunger strike at a prison in Metz in protest against having been transferred nine times in 30 months. In January 2007, he confessed to organizing the 2003 escape and was sentenced to an additional seven years in prison, while his co-conspirators were each sentenced to three. He was also sentenced to another six years for his own escape in 2001.

By July 2007, Payet was one of the most closely surveilled prisoners in France and was never kept at the same prison for more than six months. He had been officially classified as a "détenu particulièrement surveillé," or a prisoner under especially high surveillance, and placed in solitary confinement. Despite these measures, on July 14, 2007, taking advantage of Bastille Day celebrations, four masked men hijacked a helicopter from Cannes – Mandelieu Airport. They used it to free Payet from his solitary confinement in a prison in Grasse. The helicopter landed some time later at Brignoles, 38 kilometres north-east of Toulon, France, on the Mediterranean coast. Payet and his accomplices then fled the scene and the pilot was released unharmed. Two days after his escape, a European arrest warrant was issued against him.

Payet was captured on 21 September 2007, in the town of Mataró, a suburb north of Barcelona in Spain. He was transferred to French custody on 4 October 2007, along with two accomplices who had been captured with him, Alain Armato and Farid Ouassou. He was then imprisoned in a location which has been kept secret for "security reasons." On 25 June 2008, the cour d'assises of the Alpes-Maritimes department sentenced him to 15 years in prison with no chance of early release for a series of armed robberies and assaults against police officers while he evaded custody.

On 8 April 2011, the cour d'assises of Bouches-du-Rhône sentenced him to an additional five years of prison for his 2007 escape. His three accomplices were sentenced to nine, seven and six years. Some other prisoners judged complicit in the escape were given lesser sentences.

== In popular culture ==
After making headlines around the world for his Hollywood-style helicopter jailbreak, Payet became the subject of a number of TV shows and articles. His latest escape was showcased on the Netflix original White Rabbit Project "Jailbreak" episode, hosted by Grant Imahara, where Payet is portrayed by French actor Thierry Brouard.

== See also ==
- List of helicopter prison escapes
