= William W. Turner =

- Born: William Weyand Turner; April 14, 1927; Buffalo, New York
- Died: December 26, 2015 (aged 88); San Rafael, California
- Occupations: FBI agent, journalist, writer

William W. Turner (1927–2015) was an American writer and FBI agent.

== Biography ==
=== Early life ===
Turner was born on 14 April 1927 in Buffalo, New York. During World War 2 he served in the US Navy and later studied chemistry at Canisius College. Turner was a hockey goalkeeper for the college team and was drafted for the New York Rangers but decided to join the Federal Bureau of Investigation (FBI) instead.

=== Career ===
Turner was an FBI agent from 1951 to 1961, specializing in counter-espionage and major crime cases. Over the years he became increasingly critical of J. Edgar Hoover's management of the FBI. Afterwards he began writing articles and books critical of the Bureau which drew their ire. When Turner appeared on Joe Pyne's talk show in 1968, the FBI provided background information on Turner to Pyne in an attempt to discredit him. Hoover himself, in an internal memo, wrote of Turner "It's a shame we can't nail this jackal". In 1970 he published Hoover's FBI, which argued that the Bureau was over-fixated on communists to the neglect of prosecuting organized crime. He wrote "for nearly four decades, [Hoover] stuck his head in the sand while the crime syndicates waxed fat".

After leaving the FBI he started a career as a freelance journalist. In 1968 he unsuccessfully ran in the Democratic Party primary for California's 6th congressional district. His platform included opposition to the Vietnam War and criticism of US intelligence agencies, criticizing "the over-inflation of our so-called security establishments and the right-wing mentality that directs it". He was on the staff of Ramparts magazine. Turner was critical of official explanations of the assassination of John F. Kennedy. He sat on the Committee to Investigate Assassinations and aided New Orleans district attorney Jim Garrison in his investigation into the assassination.

In 1973 he published The 10-second Jailbreak: The Helicopter Escape of Joel David Kaplan, co-authored with Warren Hinckle and Eliot Asinof, later adapted as the film Breakout (1975). In 1981 he partnered with Hinckle once again to write The Fish Is Red: The Story of the Secret War Against Castro, about American plots to overthrow the Cuban government. The book was referenced by Fidel Castro during a speech he made to the 68th Inter-Parliamentary Conference.

Turner died aged 88 in San Rafael, California on 26 December 2015 after a long battle with Parkinson's Disease. He was buried at Sacramento Valley National Cemetery.

== Bibliography ==
- Invisible Witness: The Use and Abuse of the New Technology of Crime Investigation (1968)
- The Police Establishment (1968)
- Hoover's FBI: The Men and the Myth (1970)
- Power on the Right (1971)
- The 10-second Jailbreak: The Helicopter Escape of Joel David Kaplan (with Warren Hinckle and Eliot Asinof, 1973)
- The Assassination of Robert F. Kennedy: A Searching Look at the Conspiracy and the Cover-Up, 1968-1978 (with John G. Christian, 1978)
- The Fish Is Red: The Story of the Secret War Against Castro (with Hinckle, 1981)
- Deadly Secrets: The CIA-Mafia War Against Castro & the Assassination of J.F.K. (with Hinckle, 1981)
- Rearview Mirror: Looking Back at the FBI, the CIA and Other Tails (2001)
- Mission Not Accomplished: How George Bush Lost the War on Terrorism (2004)
- The Cuban Connection: Nixon, Castro, and the Mob (2013)
