= Eliot Asinof =

American sportswriter (1919–2008)

- Born: Eliot Tager Asinof; July 13, 1919; Manhattan, New York, U.S.
- Died: June 10, 2008 (aged 88); Hudson, New York, U.S.
- Education: Swarthmore College
- Occupation: Author
- Spouse: Jocelyn Brando (m. 1950; div. 1955)

Eliot Tager Asinof (July 13, 1919 – June 10, 2008) was an American writer of fiction and nonfiction best known for his writing about baseball. His most famous book was Eight Men Out, a nonfiction reconstruction of the 1919 Black Sox scandal.

== Biography ==
Asinof was born into a Jewish family in Manhattan and lived in and around New York City for much of his life. In his youth, he worked in his family's tailoring business. He graduated from Swarthmore College in 1940, then played briefly as a minor-league first baseman in the Philadelphia Phillies' organization.

During World War II, Asinof served in the U.S. Army on Adak in the Aleutian Islands.

He was married for five years to Jocelyn Brando, an actress who was the elder sister of Marlon Brando; the marriage ended in divorce in 1955.

After a baseball career ended in injury before he could make the major leagues, Asinof wrote extensively about baseball. His 1955 debut novel, Man on Spikes, was based on the experience of a friend, Mickey Rutner, who played minor league ball and twelve games in the majors. The work was chosen as one of "the golden dozen" baseball books by author Roger Kahn.

Asinof's most famous book, Eight Men Out, reconstructed the events of the Black Sox scandal which marred the World Series between the Chicago White Sox and the Cincinnati Reds in 1919. The book was published in 1963; the film Eight Men Out, whose screenplay was co-written by Asinof and director John Sayles, appeared in 1988. An article in the September 2009 issue of Chicago Lawyer magazine argued that Eight Men Out, purporting to confirm the guilt of "Shoeless" Joe Jackson, was based on inaccurate information; for example, Jackson never confessed to throwing the Series as Asinof claimed. Further, Asinof omitted key facts from publicly available documents such as the 1920 grand jury records and proceedings of Jackson's successful 1924 lawsuit against Comiskey to recover back pay for the 1920 and 1921 seasons. Asinof's use of fictional characters within a supposedly non-fiction account raised further doubts about the historical accuracy of the book.

Jackson indeed confessed to accepting $5,000 to throw the series and claimed the team threw the second game, though he maintained he played to win the whole time.

Asinof also worked on other projects related to the scandal, including TV documentaries such as the 2001 ESPN Sports Century Flashback: The 1919 Black Sox Scandal and the 2005 The Top 5 Reasons You Can't Blame the 1919 Chicago White Sox for "Throwing" the 1919 World Series to the Cincinnati Reds.

In 1968, Asinof signed the "Writers and Editors War Tax Protest" pledge, vowing to refuse tax payments in protest against the Vietnam War. In 1973 he published The 10-second Jailbreak: The Helicopter Escape of Joel David Kaplan, co-authored with Warren Hinckle and William W. Turner, later adapted as the film Breakout (1975).

Asinof wrote other novels and nonfiction books unrelated to baseball including The Fox is Crazy Too (1976), the story of skyjacker Garrett Brock Trapnell.

His career as a scriptwriter was curtailed when he was blacklisted for a time during the 1950s. He died in Hudson New York in 2008 of complications from heart failure at age 88.

== Books ==
- 1955 Man on Spikes, McGraw-Hill, ASIN B0007E0GNU online preview
- 1963. Eight Men Out: The Black Sox and the 1919 World Series, Holt Rinehart & Winston, ASIN B001JSNOO6
- 1971 Craig and Joan: Two Lives for Peace, New York: Viking Press, 1971, ISBN 0-670-24541-0
- 1973 (with Warren Hinckle and William W. Turner) The 10-second Jailbreak: The Helicopter Escape of Joel David Kaplan. Holt, Rinehart and Winston. 1973.
- 1976 The Fox Is Crazy Too: The True Story of Garrett Trapnell, Adventurer, Skyjacker, Bank Robber, Con Man, Lover, New York: William Morrow & Co, 1976, ISBN 0-688-02964-7
- 1995 Bouton, Jim; Asinof, Eliot (1995), Strike Zone, Signet Books, ISBN 978-0451183347

== Screenplays ==
- 1988 Eight Men Out (with John Sayles)
