= John Killick (Australian criminal) =

Australian criminal and author

- Born: 1942 (age 83–84)
- Occupation: Author
- Criminal charges: Bank robbery

John Killick (born 1942), is an Australian author and convicted bank robber. He is best known for escaping from Sydney's Silverwater Correctional Complex with his then-partner Lucy Dudko by helicopter on 25 March 1999.

== Criminal history ==
Killick has spent more than 30 years in jail, first going to jail in 1960. He started robbing banks in Sydney in 1966 to pay gambling debts, becoming Australia's first decimal currency bank robber when he held up the Canley Heights ANZ bank on 14 February.

In what was called the "Perfect Alibi case", Killick was framed by corrupt police officer Roger Rogerson and convicted of a bank robbery in Adelaide on the same day he was reporting to a police station in Sydney as part of his bail conditions.

On 25 March 1999, Killick's then-girlfriend Lucy Dudko, armed with an inoperable Thompson submachine gun, hijacked a helicopter which was conducting a tour of the Olympic Park site in the lead up to the 2000 Summer Olympics in Sydney. She forced the pilot to land in the nearby Silverwater Jail and pick up Killick who was waiting in the exercise yard. The duo were on the run for 45 days before being captured by police.

== Publishing ==
While in jail, Killick took to writing and has authored three books about his life: Gambling For Love, The Last Escape, and On The Inside. Australian geologist Ian Plimer encouraged and assisted his writing career. Killick's 2023 book Outlaw deals with his time as an inmate in Victoria's notorious Pentridge Prison.

Killick has expressed remorse about his crimes.

== In popular culture ==
John Kerr wrote the story of the 1999 prison escape in the 2003 book Wanted: John & Lucy: Rescue by Force, Silverwater Prison, 25 March 1999.

The 2015 single "Long Loud Hours" by Australian hip hop musician Urthboy tells the story of the 1999 escape, viewed from Dudko's perspective.

In 2015, Killick appeared on the season one episode 'Ex-Prisoners' of the Australian TV series You Can't Ask That.

== See also ==
- List of helicopter prison escapes
