= Ozark Air Lines Flight 809 =

1973 plane crash in Missouri, United States

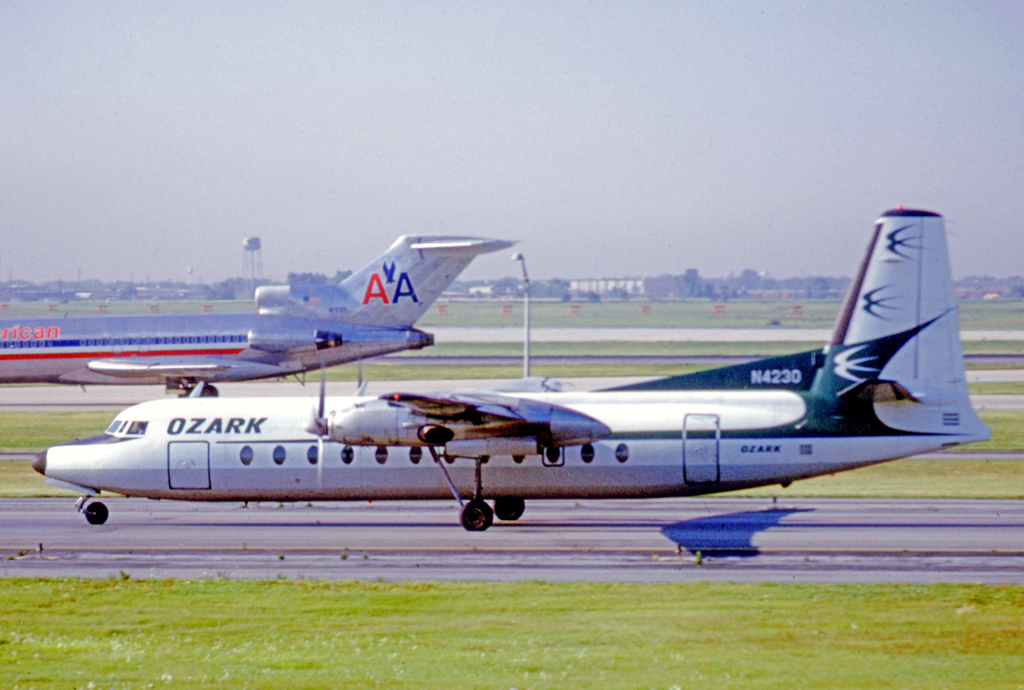
- A FH227B similar to the accident aircraft

Accident
- Date: 23 July 1973
- Summary: Windshear accident
- Site: Normandy, Missouri, United States; 38°43′07″N 90°18′30″W

Aircraft
- Aircraft type: Fairchild-Hiller FH-227
- Operator: Ozark Air Lines
- IATA flight No.: OZ809
- ICAO flight No.: OZA809
- Call sign: OZARK 809
- Registration: N4215
- Flight origin: Nashville International Airport, Nashville, Tennessee, United States
- 1st stopover: Clarksville-Montgomery County Regional Airport, Clarksville, Tennessee, United States
- 2nd stopover: Barkley Regional Airport, Paducah, Kentucky, United States
- 3rd stopover: Cape Girardeau Airport, Cape Girardeau, Missouri, United States
- Last stopover: Williamson County Regional Airport, Marion, Illinois, United States
- Destination: St. Louis Lambert International Airport, St. Louis, Missouri, United States
- Passengers: 41
- Crew: 3
- Fatalities: 38
- Injuries: 6
- Survivors: 6

Ozark Air Lines Flight 809 was a regularly scheduled flight from Nashville, Tennessee, to St. Louis, Missouri, with four intermediate stops. On July 23, 1973, while landing at St. Louis International Airport, it crashed, killing 38 of the 44 persons aboard. A severe downdraft, associated with a nearby thunderstorm, was cited as the cause.

== Synopsis ==
On July 23, 1973, Ozark Air Lines Flight 809 was operated by one of the company's Fairchild-Hiller FH-227s, registration N4215. The flight was scheduled to go from Nashville, Tennessee, to St. Louis, Missouri, with four intermediate stops at Clarksville, Tennessee; Paducah, Kentucky; Cape Girardeau, Missouri; and Marion, Illinois. The segments to Clarksville, Paducah, Cape Girardeau, and Marion proceeded normally.

While the weather was clear at the flight's stops, several persons who boarded family or friends on the flight at Marion reported that the sky "didn't look good". The flight departed Marion at 1705 en route to St. Louis.

At 1726 the flight arrived in the vicinity of St. Louis. Visibility in the area was reported as hazy. The flight continued on and soon after reported an inoperative fuel pump to company maintenance.

At 1732 the flight entered an area of thunderstorm cells around St. Louis International Airport. The pilot told the passengers they were approaching turbulence. At 1742 the controller at St. Louis reported to Flight 809 that thunderstorms were passing south of the runway, directly in Flight 809's path. This was the last transmission to the flight. The aircraft crashed 2 miles (3.2 km) short of the runway, in a wooded ravine next to a residential area in Normandy, Missouri, near the University of Missouri-St. Louis. There were reports of a tornado near Ladue, Missouri near the time of the accident but the Weather Service did not confirm it.

== Investigation ==
The flight had crashed directly in the approach path to St. Louis International Airport. It had descended below the glide slope, crashing short of the runway. Witnesses in the area saw the flight "suddenly ascend to 400 or 500 feet" (between 122 and 152 m) "and then rapidly descend to 200 feet" (61 m), following which it was struck by lightning. The aircraft was reported to have performed several "evasive maneuvers" before crashing into the trees. All witnesses reported heavy rain at the time of the accident.

A Trans World Airlines flight landing just before Flight 809 reported getting caught in a strong updraft and being forced to execute a missed approach rather than a landing.

The captain and first officer both survived the accident. While the first officer could not remember anything about the incident, the captain did report seeing hail hitting the airplane, pulling the control stick, and seeing fire after impact.

The aircraft was broken in several pieces after impact; the cockpit area was clear of the main wreckage. Four passengers were thrown clear at impact; all survived. The remainder of the fuselage was broken open; all in this area were killed upon impact.

No mechanical defects other than the inoperative fuel pump were reported. The aircraft was found to be in a high nose-up attitude at impact.

The approach controller vectored Flight 809 into Runway 30L at St. Louis. Although the flight crew knew thunderstorms were in the vicinity of the airport, the controller's lack of urgency seemed to lead the flight crew to believe they could land ahead of the storms.

In coming through the storm, the high winds in the storm cell led investigators to believe that a strong downdraft pushed the plane below the glide slope. The crew's evasive actions were not sufficient to prevent the plane from striking the ground.

The investigators' main questions were why the controller had not indicated the severity of the storm to the flight and why, once the flight knew of the storms, they had not requested a different path to the airport to avoid the storm.

== Cause ==
The National Transportation Safety Board concluded that the crash was caused by the aircraft encountering a severe downdraft on approach, and the captain's decision to continue the flight into a known severe storm area. The captain's decision was influenced by the lack of a timely warning about the storm by the weather service and the improper assessment of conditions by the dispatcher.

== See also ==
- List of accidents and incidents involving commercial aircraft
- Microburst
- Delta Air Lines Flight 191
