= Vassilis Palaiokostas =

Greek fugitive (born 1966)

Vasilis Palaiokostas
- Βασίλης Παλαιοκώστας
- Born: May 17, 1966 (age 60); Moschofyto, Trikala, Greece
- Convictions: 25 years imprisonment
- Criminal charges: Robberies, car thefts, burglaries, kidnappings, prison escapes
- Reward amount: € 1.000.000

Vasilis Palaiokostas (Greek: Βασίλης Παλαιοκώστας; born 17 May 1966) is a Greek bank robber and fugitive known as the "Greek Robin Hood" for his habit of giving away stolen money to the poor.

He twice escaped by helicopter from the Greek high-security Korydallos prison while serving a 25-year sentence. He is still free, earning him the nickname "the uncatchable".

He wrote an autobiography entitled A Normal Life, published in November 2021 by Freedom Press.

== Biography ==
Palaiokostas grew up in a small village in the mountains in central Greece.

His brother Nikos Palaiokostas was in prison for 16 bank robberies. Having been sentenced to 197 years plus 376 months imprisonment for various offences, he was released from incarceration due to poor health and began serving the rest of his sentence under house arrest, having spent 16 years behind bars in Patras state pentitentiary.

Palaiokostas became famous for giving most of the stolen money to poor families, making him a local "Robin of the Poor", reminiscent of the tale of Robin Hood.

In 2000 he was sentenced to 25 years in prison for the 1995 kidnapping of Alexander Haitoglou, the CEO of Haitoglou Bros.

=== 2006 escape ===
On the afternoon of 4 June, two accomplices hired a trip on a sight-seeing helicopter from Agios Kosmas, a coastal suburb of Athens. They hijacked the helicopter using a pistol and hand grenade, and forced the pilot to fly to the prison. When the helicopter arrived, guards believed the helicopter was a visit from prison inspectors. The helicopter flew the prisoners to a cemetery nearby, where they transferred to motorcycles and fled from there.

Palaiokostas was re-captured two years later on 2 August 2008 in Thessaloniki.

=== 2009 escape ===
On the afternoon of 22 February, Palaiokostas again escaped from Athens' Korydallos Prison by helicopter. He and his cellmate Alket Rizai, 34, climbed a rope ladder thrown to them by a female passenger in the helicopter as it flew over the prison courtyard. Guards on the ground opened fire and the woman fired back with an automatic rifle. No injuries were reported due to the short gun fight, although one prison guard injured himself while trying to pull out his gun.

The pilot was bound and gagged, with a hood over his head. He told police the helicopter was chartered by a couple who said they wanted to go from the town of Itea in central Greece to Athens. The couple had chartered the helicopter a number of times in the previous weeks, with the woman posing as a business woman. According to the pilot, who claimed to have been forced into taking part in the escape, Palaiokostas and Rizai were delivered to a getaway car.

The government of Greece faced intense criticism after his second escape from the same facility, and the government responded by firing three justice ministry officials and arresting three prison guards.

Palaiokostas is still at large with a one-million euro bounty placed on him for information leading to his arrest. His accomplice Alket Rizai was re-arrested in November 2009.

== See also ==
- List of fugitives from justice who disappeared
