= Nordine Ben Allal =

Belgian criminal of Moroccan origin

- Born: 1978 or 1979; Morocco
- Status: Incarcerated
- Penalty: 27-year prison sentence in June 2004

Nordine Ben Allal (born 1978 or 1979) is a Belgian criminal of Moroccan origin who was sentenced to a 27-year prison sentence in June 2004 for several robberies. In October 2007 he made headlines when he used a helicopter to escape from prison.

Finally, on 21 August 2020, at night, he was arrested in Ceuta by the National Police of Spain after kidnapping a man along with other two known hitmen in an intervention in which the police were shot. Now he is in prison and is accused of the crimes of illegal detention, attack on an agent of authority, injuries and criminal organization.

== Escape attempts ==
Ben Allal has escaped four times, in October 2000, in December 2000, in August 2004 and in October 2007.

=== Third attempt 2004 ===
His third escape from prison took place from 8 August to 13 August 2004. During his escape, he was spotted by two police officers from the Police Zone Midi (which covers Anderlecht, Saint-Gilles and Forest). The policemen followed him into the neighbouring municipality of Molenbeek-Saint-Jean, where Ben Allal opened fire on them, injuring the two officers. He was the most wanted fugitive in Belgium during that week and was finally captured by special police teams while hiding in the trunk of a car. Ben Allal is considered to be one of the most dangerous criminals in Belgium. In November 2005 he was sentenced to an extra 12 years in prison for the shooting.

=== Fourth attempt 2007 ===
His latest escape occurred on 28 October 2007 when he escaped again from the high security prison in Ittre, Belgium. A hijacked helicopter landed during the evening walk and several prisoners ran towards it to get a ride out of prison. The helicopter took off but crashed, and one prisoner was injured. During the distraction, Ben Allal and an accomplice were able to get away in guard uniforms and joined their awaiting helpers who had a car waiting for them, which was found abandoned a few hours later.

On 30 October 2007, Ben Allal attempted to commit an armed robbery with an accomplice in The Hague, Netherlands, but was arrested by the Dutch Police when trying to escape on a motorcycle.

== See also ==
- List of helicopter prison escapes
