= Lucy Dudko =

Russian-Australian woman convicted of hijacking a helicopter

- Born: Lyudmila Vitalievna Zhdanova; 1958 (age 67–68); Kuybyshev, Russian SFSR, Soviet Union
- Other name: Red Lucy
- Occupation: Librarian
- Years active: 1999
- Known for: 1999 helicopter hijacking
- Spouse: Aleksey Dudko
- Children: Maria Dudko
- Parent: Vitaliy Zhdanov
- Status: Released on parole after 7 years' imprisonment
- Criminal charges: Rescue of an inmate in lawful custody by force Assault on a member of the crew of an aircraft Detention for advantage Unauthorised possession of a firearm (two counts)
- Penalty: Maximum 10 years' imprisonment
- Time at large: March 25 – May 8, 1999

Details
- Imprisoned at: Mulawa Women's Prison (1999–2006)

Lucy Dudko is an Australian woman convicted of hijacking a helicopter in 1999, which she used in the escape from Silverwater Correctional Complex of convicted armed robber John Killick. Dudko served time in the Mulawa Women's Prison from 1999 to 2006 before being released on parole.

== Background ==
Dudko was the mistress of John Killick (whom she had met at a party in the mid-1990s), who was being held on remand at Sydney's Silverwater Correctional Centre on charges of armed robbery. At the time, Dudko was residing with Killick's wife Gloria and visited Killick three times a week at his prison. During these meetings, Killick revealed a plan for Dudko to help him escape, having formed the idea of using a helicopter.

== Helicopter hijacking and Killick's breakout ==
On the morning of 25 March 1999, Dudko waited at the Sydney International Airport to receive a call from Killick to confirm that he was entering the exercise yard at Silverwater. Once alerted, Dudko began a pre-booked helicopter flight over the construction site of Sydney Olympic Park. However, shortly into the flight Dudko drew a pistol from her bag and turned it on pilot Timothy Joyce. He was instructed to fly over the prison and land on the oval where Killick was able to climb into the helicopter. Prison officers quickly opened fire on the helicopter, with two bullets making contact.

Once the helicopter was landed, Joyce was tied up and the couple hijacked a car to flee the location. Dudko and Killick remained on the run in both Victoria and New South Wales for 45 days. The escape made international headlines and has become one of the most famous counts of criminal activity in Australia during 1999. The actions also led to Dudko being dubbed "Red Lucy" by the media for her "crime of passion".

== Capture and imprisonment ==
On 8 May 1999 the couple, returning to Sydney to receive money from one of Killick's former acquaintances, was arrested at the Bass Hill Caravan Park, where they had rented a cabin as "Mr. and Mrs. MG Brown".

In March 2001, Dudko's trial began. She was found guilty by a jury of the District Court of New South Wales of five charges: the rescue of an inmate in lawful custody by force, assault on a member of the crew of an aircraft, detention for advantage, and two counts of unauthorised possession of a firearm. She was sentenced to 10 years' imprisonment with a non-parole period of 7 years. Dudko served her time at the Mulawa Women's Prison and was released on parole on 9 May 2006.

During her time in prison, Dudko wrote some 4,500 love letters to Killick. She ended all communications and as such their relationship when she rediscovered her faith in the Bible, something Killick did not believe in.

== In popular culture ==
John Kerr printed the story of the prison escape for the first time in the 2003 book Wanted: John & Lucy: Rescue by Force, Silverwater Prison, 25 March 1999.

The 2015 single "Long Loud Hours" by Australian hip hop musician Urthboy tells the story of Dudko's crime, sung from her perspective.

== Life after prison ==
As of 2009, Dudko was working at a Rydalmere factory and living in a one-bedroom flat at the base of the Blue Mountains.

A condition of Killick's parole upon his release from prison in 2015 was that he was not permitted to have any contact with Dudko until 2022 (when he will be 80 years old). However, in a later review of these terms, this condition was removed. Killick must still receive permission from his parole officer before making any contact with Dudko.

== See also ==
- List of helicopter prison escapes
