= Jorge Moreno =

Jorge Moreno may refer to:

- Jorge Moreno (musician), Cuban-American musician and entrepreneur
- Jorge Moreno (footballer), Spanish footballer

== See also ==
- Moreno (surname)
