= Kalochori, Thessaloniki =

Kalochori Καλοχώρι
- Community
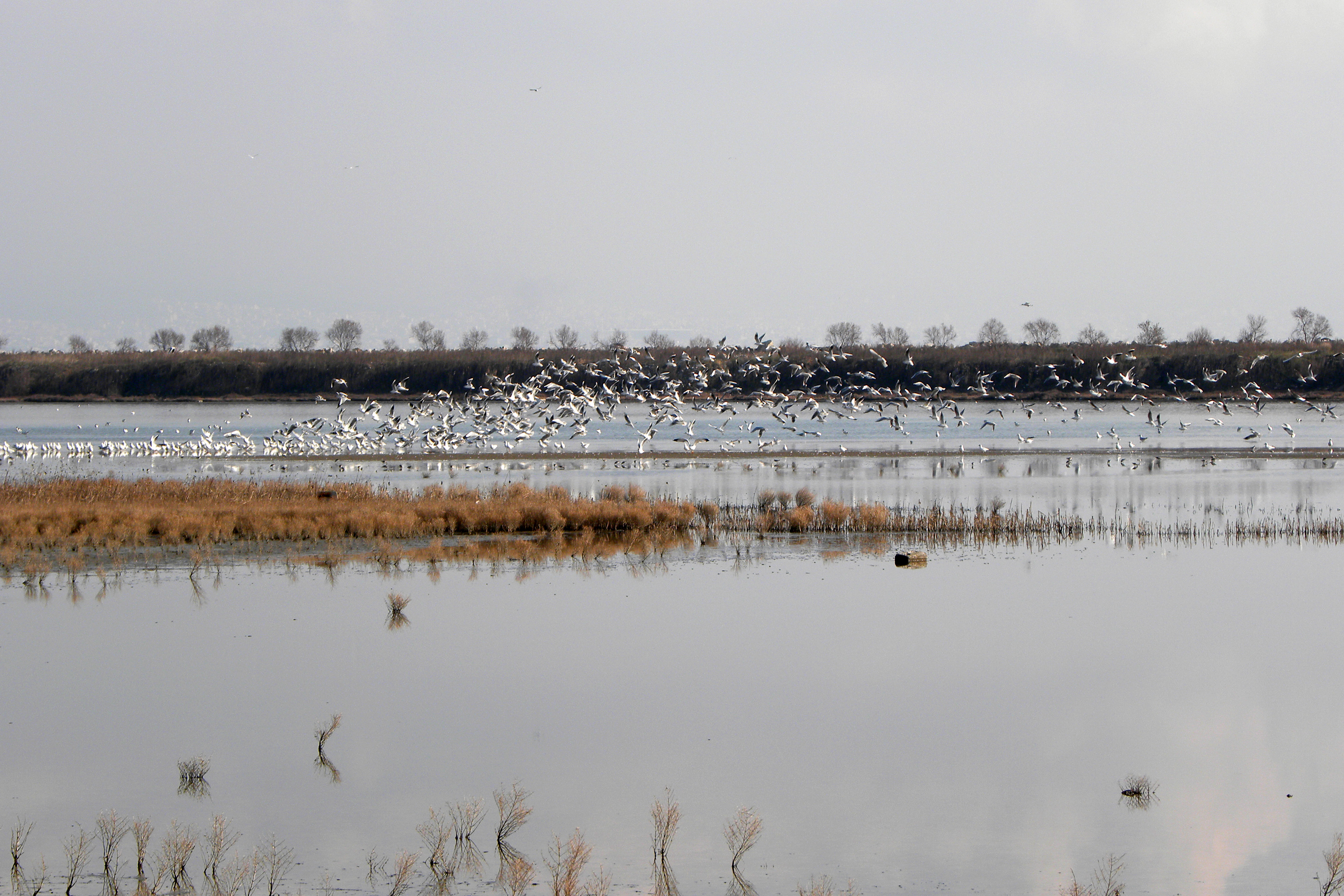

- Location within Greece
- Coordinates: 40°38.5′N 22°51.4′E
- Country: Greece
- Administrative region: Central Macedonia
- Regional unit: Thessaloniki
- Municipality: Delta
- Municipal unit: Echedoros

Area
  - Community: 32.127 km^{2} (12.404 sq mi)
- Elevation: 7 m (23 ft)

Population (2021)
  - Community: 4,626
  - Density: 144.0/km^{2} (372.9/sq mi)
- Time zone: UTC+2 (EET)
  - Summer (DST): UTC+3 (EEST)
- Postal code: 575 00
- Area code: +30-231
- Vehicle registration: NA to NX

Kalochori (Greek: Καλοχώρι) is a village and a community of the Delta municipality. Before the 2011 local government reform it was part of the municipality of Echedoros, of which it was a municipal district. The 2021 census recorded 4,626 inhabitants in the village. The community of Kalochori covers an area of 32.127 km^{2}.

== History ==
In February 2012, it was reported that many historical artifacts had been discovered during an excavation. In September 2016, New Zealanders built a shipping container library for refugees in the area.

== See also ==
- List of settlements in the Thessaloniki regional unit
