= TWA Flight 541 =

1978 US aircraft hijacking incident

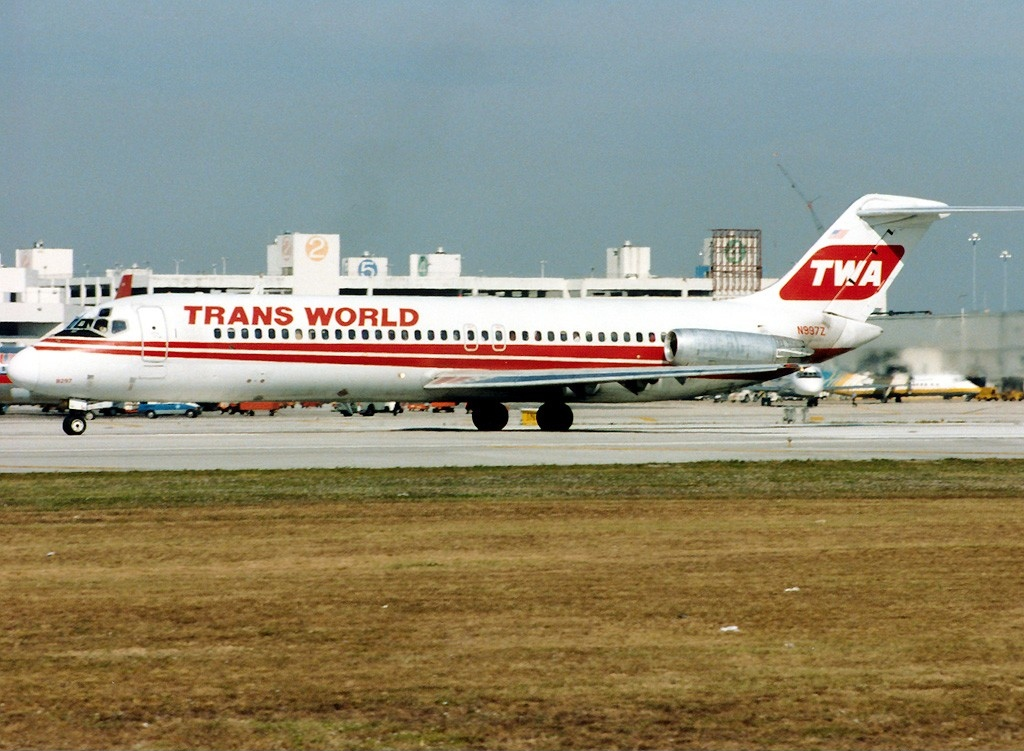
- A TWA DC-9, similar to the aircraft involved in the hijack

Hijacking
- Date: December 21, 1978
- Summary: Hijacking
- Site: Energy, Illinois; 37°45′18″N 089°00′40″W

Aircraft
- Aircraft type: McDonnell Douglas DC-9
- Operator: Trans World Airlines
- Flight origin: Standiford Field, Louisville, KY
- Stopover: Williamson County Regional Airport (due to forced landing)
- Destination: Kansas City International Airport
- Occupants: 87
- Fatalities: 0
- Injuries: 0
- Survivors: 87

TWA Flight 541 was a domestic passenger flight hijacked in the United States by Robin Oswald in an attempt to free Garrett Brock Trapnell, who was a prisoner at the United States Penitentiary, Marion (USP Marion). The hijacking was successfully resolved when a Federal Bureau of Investigation (F.B.I.) negotiating team persuaded the hijacker to release the passengers and then surrender.

== Background ==
On January 29, 1972, Garrett B. Trapnell hijacked a TWA plane flying from Los Angeles to New York. He demanded $306,800 (equivalent to $2,300,000 in 2024), the release of the imprisoned Angela Davis, and a conversation with President Nixon. The hijacking was resolved when Trapnell was disarmed after being shot by an F.B.I. agent who pretended to be a negotiator.

On May 24, 1978, Trapnell's friend, 43-year-old Barbara Ann Oswald, a US Army staff sergeant on leave, hijacked a Saint Louis based charter helicopter and forced the pilot to land in the yard at United States Penitentiary, Marion. While landing the aircraft, the pilot, Vietnam War veteran Allen Barklage, struggled with Oswald and managed to wrestle the gun away from her. Barklage then shot and killed Oswald, thwarting the escape.

== Incident ==
On December 21, 1978, Robin Oswald, the 17-year-old daughter of Barbara Annette Oswald, hijacked TWA Flight 541 and demanded Trapnell be freed or she would detonate dynamite strapped to her body. She was remembered by the hostages aboard the flight as a "beautiful" but serious girl, never showing alarm at her actions.

FBI negotiators were able to free the hostages and have Oswald surrender with no injuries or deaths. The bomb that was strapped to her chest later emerged to be railroad flares wired to what appeared to be a doorbell. Robin Oswald was charged as a juvenile with charges not being announced as is the law in Illinois.

== Aftermath ==
Garrett B. Trapnell died in prison, in 1993, of emphysema.

== See also ==
- List of helicopter prison escapes
