= Dudko =

Dudko (Cyrillic: Дудко) is a gender-neutral Slavic surname. Notable people with the surname include:

- Lucy Dudko (born 1958), Russian-Australian woman convicted of hijacking a helicopter in 1999
- Mikhail Dudko (1902–1981), Russian ballet dancer
