= Silverwater Correctional Complex =

Prison in New South Wales, Australia

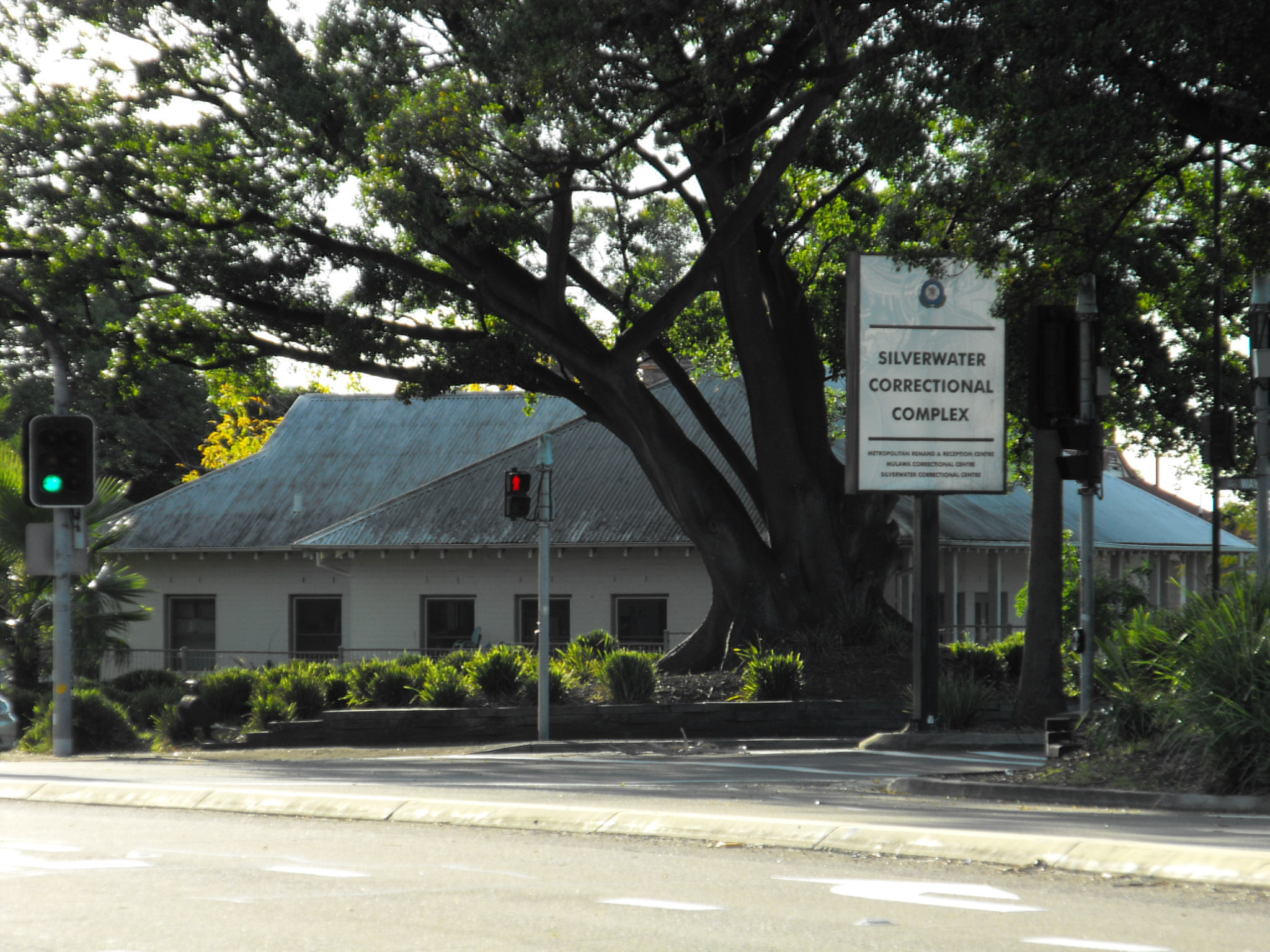
- Entrance to the Silverwater Correctional Complex
- Location of Silverwater Correctional Complex in Sydney
- Location: Silverwater, New South Wales; 33°49′51.5″S 151°3′27.6″E
- Status: Operational
- Security class: Maximum, minimum (male and female)
- Capacity: xxx (SCC); 200 (SWCC); 900 (MRRC); xxx (DdLCC)
- Opened: 1970 (SWCC); 1997 (MRRC)
- Managed by: Corrective Services NSW

The Silverwater Correctional Complex, an Australian maximum and minimum security prison complex for males and females, is located in Silverwater, 21 km (13 mi) west of the Sydney central business district in New South Wales, Australia. The complex is operated by Corrective Services NSW, an agency of the New South Wales Government Department of Communities and Justice.

The complex comprises three separate facilities including Silverwater Women's Correctional Centre (a maximum security institution for women); the Metropolitan Remand & Reception Centre (a maximum security correctional facility for males); and the Dawn de Loas Correctional Centre (a minimum security correctional centre for males).

The complex accepts prisoners charged and convicted under both New South Wales and Commonwealth legislation, and serves as a reception prison for inmates on remand or pending classification.

== Silverwater Correctional Centre ==
Silverwater Correctional Centre, an Australian minimum security facility for males, is located within the complex.

=== Notable prisoners ===
- Sef Gonzales – Filipino Australian convicted of murdering his parents and sister.
- Robert Hughes – an Australian actor convicted of sexual assaults on then minors during filming of the hit Australian TV sitcom Hey Dad...!
- Chris Munce – convicted of fixing during a horse racing meeting in Hong Kong.
- René Rivkin – (1944–2005) stockbroker and businessman, sentenced to periodic detention due to ill health.
- Ben Roberts-Smith – former Australian soldier charged with war crimes, remanded at Silverwater in April 2026 before being granted bail.
- Eddie Obeid – a former NSW politician convicted of conspiracy and misconduct in public office. He was ordered to hand himself in in October 2021. His son will join him in jail too.
- Salim Mehajer – a former property developer and Deputy Mayor of Auburn City Council who was imprisoned at Silverwater for fraud charges.

== Silverwater Women's Correctional Centre ==
The Silverwater Women's Correctional Centre (formerly known as the Mulawa Correctional Centre), an Australian maximum security facility for females is located within the complex, and began service in 1969. The centre is divided into twelve living units, a protection/segregation area, an induction unit, a hospital annexe, and provides accommodation for both sentenced and unsentenced inmates and various special program units. The facility began as the old women's prison at Long Bay was converted into a medium security facility for men.

Fraud is the most common reason for imprisonment. Inmates are eligible to study for national recognised qualifications including vocation and TAFE courses.

In the 2010 New South Wales state budget, the prison was allocated $200,000 for a new video conferencing system.

The Centre will close most of its facilities by September 2026, as they are beyond repair & cells have ligature points, and will be moved to Dylwynnia Women's Jail at Cessnock. The Women's Remand and Reception Section will be the only remaining female facility at Silverwater.

=== Notable prisoners ===
- Lindy Chamberlain – New Zealand-born Australian convicted and later acquitted of murdering her 9-week-old daughter Azaria; Chamberlain gave birth to another child of her husband Michael Chamberlain while in custody; she was held at Silverwater (then Mulawa Women's Prison), then transferred to Berrimah Prison; incarcerated from 29 October 1982 to 7 February 1986.
- Violet Coco – climate activist with 15 month sentence for blocking one lane of the Sydney Harbour Bridge in December 2022.
- Kathleen Folbigg – convicted of the murders of her 3 infant children; incarcerated in 2003 and pardoned in 2023
- Maddison Hall – convicted of the murder of hitchhiker Lyn Saunders.
- Katherine Knight – convicted of the murder of de facto husband John Price.
- Theresa Lawson – (1951–2014) convicted of the largest fraud in NSW history.
- Rachel Pfitnzer – convicted of murdering her son Dean Shillingsworth.
- Sandra Willson – transferred to Mulawa Detention Centre from Parramatta Psychiatric Centre in 1970, after being declared not guilty on ground of insanity for the 1959 murder of a taxi driver, released in 1977 following protests on her behalf by the Women Behind Bars activist group.

== Metropolitan Remand and Reception Centre ==
The Metropolitan Remand and Reception Centre (MRRC), an Australian maximum security facility for males is located within the complex. The prison opened in 1997, and has a capacity of 900 inmates. It is the largest single correctional centre in Australia. The majority of inmates are unconvicted or unsentenced.

In March, 1999, Russian Australian librarian Lucy Dudko hired a helicopter supposedly to check out the upcoming Olympic site in Sydney. Using a gun, she forced pilot, Tim Joyce, to land within the Metropolitan Remand and Reception Centre grounds. Waiting was her partner John Killick, who was serving 28 years for armed robberies. He jumped in the helicopter making an escape while being fired on by guards and cheered on by inmates. They landed in a park where Killick hijacked a taxi at gunpoint. The two were able to elude authorities for six weeks before being arrested at the Bass Hill Tourist Park.

In 2004, the Independent Commission Against Corruption conducted an investigation at the prison which concluded that mobile phones were becoming a significant security threat in Australian correctional facilities.

In April 2012, the facility was inundated with members of outlaw motorcycle clubs. Segregation between members of the same gangs is enforced in an effort to break member ties.

=== Notable prisoners ===
- Rodney Adler – disgraced former director of HIH Insurance and businessman.
- Hew Raymond Griffiths – British-born Australian alleged software pirate, before his extradition to the US.
- Man Haron Monis – (1964–2014) Iranian-born Australian; convicted "hate mail" campaigner against the families of dead soldiers, faced numerous charges of being an accessory to murder and sexual assault. Perpetrator of the 2014 Sydney Siege, shot dead by New South Wales Police Force Tactical Operations Unit.
- Phuong Ngo – Vietnamese Australian politician and businessman convicted of ordering the 1994 killing of Australian NSW state MP John Newman.
- Dragan Vasiljković – (aka Captain Dragan and Daniel Snedden), former Serbian paramilitary commander and alleged war criminal.
- Danushka Gunathilaka – Sri Lankan cricketer

== Dawn de Loas Correctional Centre ==
The Dawn de Loas Correctional Centre, an Australian minimum security work release centre for males, is located within the complex.

== Major incidents ==
In March 1999, inmate John Killick escaped Silverwater Prison via a helicopter that had been hijacked by his partner, Lucy Dudko.

In March 2021, an Officer working on the complex died after shooting himself just moments after driving an escort truck.

In October 2021, a former prison guard who used to work at Silverwater was sentenced to jail for assault. Before this she was punished for having inappropriate contact with a prisoner at the jail.

== See also ==
- Newington House
- Silverwater Prison Complex Conservation Area
- Punishment in Australia
