= Sorrowful and Immaculate Heart of Mary (cult) =

- Classification: Christianity
- Orientation: Catholicism
- Leader: Juliano Verbard
- Region: Réunion

The Sorrowful and Immaculate Heart of Mary (French: Cœur douloureux et immaculé de Marie) is a new religious movement with Catholic background founded in 2001 by Juliano Verbard in Piton Saint-Leu, Réunion. The group, widely referred to as a cult, was the subject of a substantial coverage in the media after several judicial cases involving the founder.

== History ==
Born in 1982, founder Juliano Verbard calls himself "Little Lily of Love" ("Petit Lys d'Amour"). He claims that the Virgin Mary speaks to him every 8th day of each month at 22 in a coconut tree. Followers must pay 20 euro to attend to collective prayers.

On 9 July 2007, he kidnapped Alexander, a 12-year child, in Sainte-Suzanne, Réunion, in whom he saw his successor and who was released on 5 August 2007. In February 2008, he was accused of child abuse and fraud and was sentenced to fifteen-year imprisonment for raping two children who were respectively 8 and 13. In April 2009, he managed to escape from prison by helicopter with two of his followers, Alexis Michel and his son Jean-Fabrice. He was recaptured in May of the same year, and eventually sentenced to an additional 13 years for the escape.

This movement was not recognized by the Catholic hierarchy. It was inspired by an Australian religious group named the Order of Saint Charbel, created by German William Kamm, known as "Little Pebble" ("Petit Caillou"). It was also inspired by a French community named Amour et Miséricorde, located in the Jura department in which Verbard lived in 2003.

The religious group is criticized by French anti-cult associations, including CCMM and ADFI which considered it as a cult.
