= Garrett Brock Trapnell =

American criminal (1938–1993)

- Born: January 31, 1938; Brockton, Massachusetts, U.S.
- Died: September 7, 1993 (aged 55); MCFP Springfield, Springfield, Missouri, U.S.
- Criminal charges: Hijacking of an aircraft, kidnapping and armed robbery, conspiracy to commit kidnapping and escape from custody
- Penalty: Life imprisonment for hijacking, concurrent five years to life for armed robbery, consecutive 15 years for kidnapping conspiracy

Garrett Brock Trapnell (January 31, 1938 – September 7, 1993) was a con man, bank robber, and aircraft hijacker of the 1960s and early 1970s. Trapnell robbed a string of banks in Canada, frequently posed as an agent of the Central Intelligence Agency, masterminded a $100,000 jewelry store heist in Freeport, Bahamas, and simultaneously maintained marriages with at least six women. When arrested for his crimes, he frequently feigned madness and successfully used the insanity defense to be committed to mental institutions, from which he would later escape or be released on the grounds that he was no longer dangerous. While serving life imprisonment for the hijacking of a passenger airliner in 1972, he was the subject of a book, The Fox Is Crazy Too, written by journalist Eliot Asinof.

A lifelong smoker, he died at the United States Medical Center for Federal Prisoners in Springfield, Missouri after developing emphysema.

== Hijacking and trial ==
On January 28, 1972, Trapnell, using a .45 caliber pistol he had smuggled aboard inside a plaster cast on his arm, hijacked TWA Flight #2 from Los Angeles to New York while over Chicago. Trapnell demanded $306,800 in cash (to recoup the loss of a recent court case), the release of Angela Davis (as well as that of a friend of his who was also imprisoned), and a formal pardon from President Richard Nixon. The FBI was able to retake the aircraft during a crew switch at Kennedy Airport; Trapnell was shot and wounded but no one else was hurt. Trapnell's skyjacking came after a string of similar domestic incidents (especially Cuba-bound hijackings) and was directly responsible for an overhaul of security procedures by the Federal Aviation Administration that remained in place until the September 11 attacks almost 30 years later.

At trial he pleaded insanity, claiming that he suffered from multiple personality disorder and schizophrenia and that the hijacking was actually committed by an alter ego named "Greg Ross." This position was discredited when the prosecution produced audio recordings from an interview with Trapnell, recorded months before the hijacking, in which he had boasted to a journalist of his skill at faking insanity. Nevertheless, the trial still ended in a hung jury when a lone juror (a social worker by profession) held out for acquittal. At his retrial four months later, however, he was convicted and sentenced to life imprisonment, which was affirmed on appeal. His subsequent incarceration at USP Marion, the first federal supermax prison, was marked by continued scheming and criminal endeavour.

== Attempted breakouts ==
On May 24, 1978, Trapnell's friend, 43-year-old Barbara Ann Oswald, hijacked a St. Louis-based charter helicopter and forced the pilot to land in the yard at USP Marion, where Trapnell was serving his sentence. While landing the aircraft the pilot, Allen Barklage, who was a Vietnam veteran, struggled with Oswald and managed to wrestle the gun away from her. Barklage then shot and killed Oswald, thwarting the escape. Another inmate involved in this escape attempt was Martin J. McNally, who had hijacked a St. Louis-Tulsa American Airlines Flight on June 23, 1972 and demanded $502,500 before jumping out of a Boeing 727 over Peru, Indiana.

Barklage died in an unrelated helicopter crash on September 19, 1998, succumbing to his wounds on September 25; McNally was paroled on January 27, 2010.

According to Eddie G. Griffin, an author, former member of the Black Panther Party, and convicted bank robber who was incarcerated at Marion at the time, Trapnell was placed under a "no human contact" order following the attempted escape and spent most of the remainder of his life in solitary confinement.

On December 21, 1978, Robin Oswald, the 17-year-old daughter of Barbara Ann Oswald, hijacked TWA Flight 541 and demanded that Trapnell be freed or she would detonate dynamite that was strapped to her body. Robin Oswald was remembered by the hostages aboard the flight as a "beautiful girl" with a serious demeanor, who never exhibited any signs of nervousness. FBI negotiators were able to free the passengers and induce her to surrender with no injuries or deaths. The bomb that was strapped to her chest later emerged to be a set of railroad flares wired to what appeared to be a doorbell. Robin Oswald was charged as a juvenile, with the court records sealed, per Illinois law.
