= United States incarceration rate =

Incarceration rate of the United States

Incarceration rates by state. From various years; latest available as of June 2024. State, federal, and local inmates.

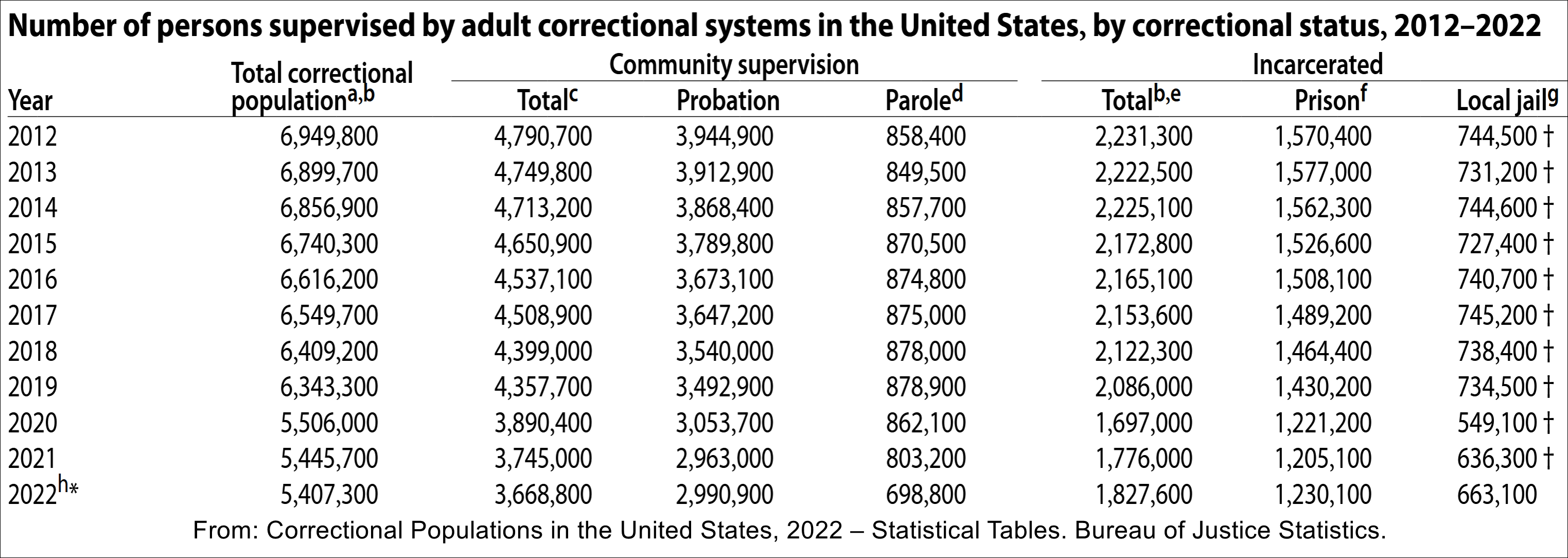
Number of persons supervised by adult correctional systems in the United States, by correctional status. Bureau of Justice Statistics.

According to the World Prison Brief (WPB) the United States had the world's highest incarceration rate from 2001 (when the US overtook Russia) through October 4, 2022 (US rate of 629 per 100,000 population at that time). That was except for periods when the Seychelles (population around 121,000) had the highest rate. According to the WPB as of September 3, 2025 the United States had the fifth highest incarceration rate in the world, at 541 per 100,000 population, using the latest available solid US numbers (2022) from the Bureau of Justice Statistics. Between 2019 and 2020, the United States saw a significant drop in the total number of incarcerations. State and federal prison, and local jail, incarcerations dropped from 2.1 million in 2019 to 1.7 million in 2020. The US incarceration total has risen since 2020. See the Bureau of Justice Statistics timeline table to the right below the map.

As of their March 2023 publication, the Prison Policy Initiative, a non-profit organization for decarceration, estimated that in the United States, about 1.9 million people were or are currently incarcerated. Of those who were incarcerated, 1,047,000 people were in state prison, 514,000 in local jails, 209,000 in federal prisons, 36,000 in youth correctional facilities, 34,000 in immigration detention camps, 22,000 in involuntary commitment, 8,000 in territorial prisons, 2,000 in Indian Country jails, and 1,000 in United States military prisons. The data is from various years depending on what is the latest available data.

Corrections (which includes prisons, jails, probation, and parole) cost around $74 billion in 2007 according to the U.S. Bureau of Justice Statistics (BJS). According to the Justice Expenditures and Employment in the United States, 2017 report release by BJS, it is estimated that county and municipal governments spent roughly US$30 billion on corrections in 2017.

== Prison and jail population ==
Total incarceration in the United States by year

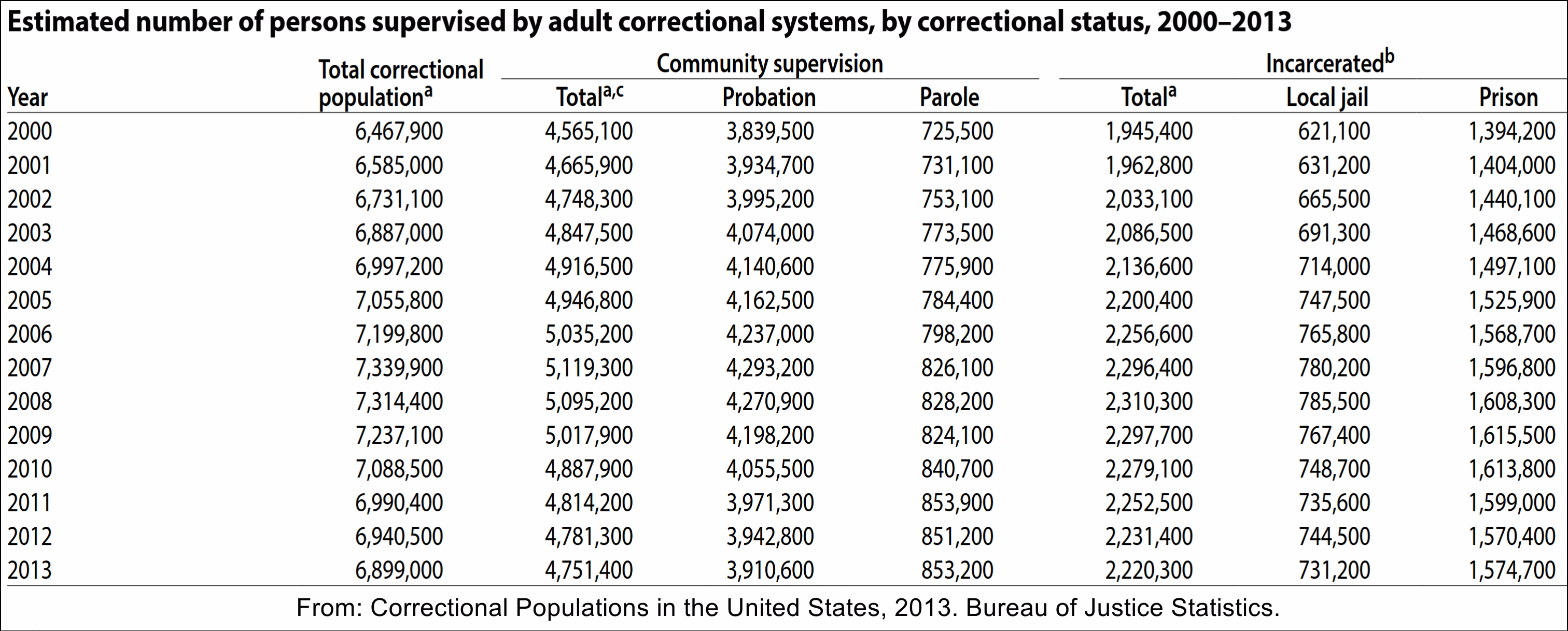
Total US incarceration peaked in 2008. Total correctional population peaked in 2007.

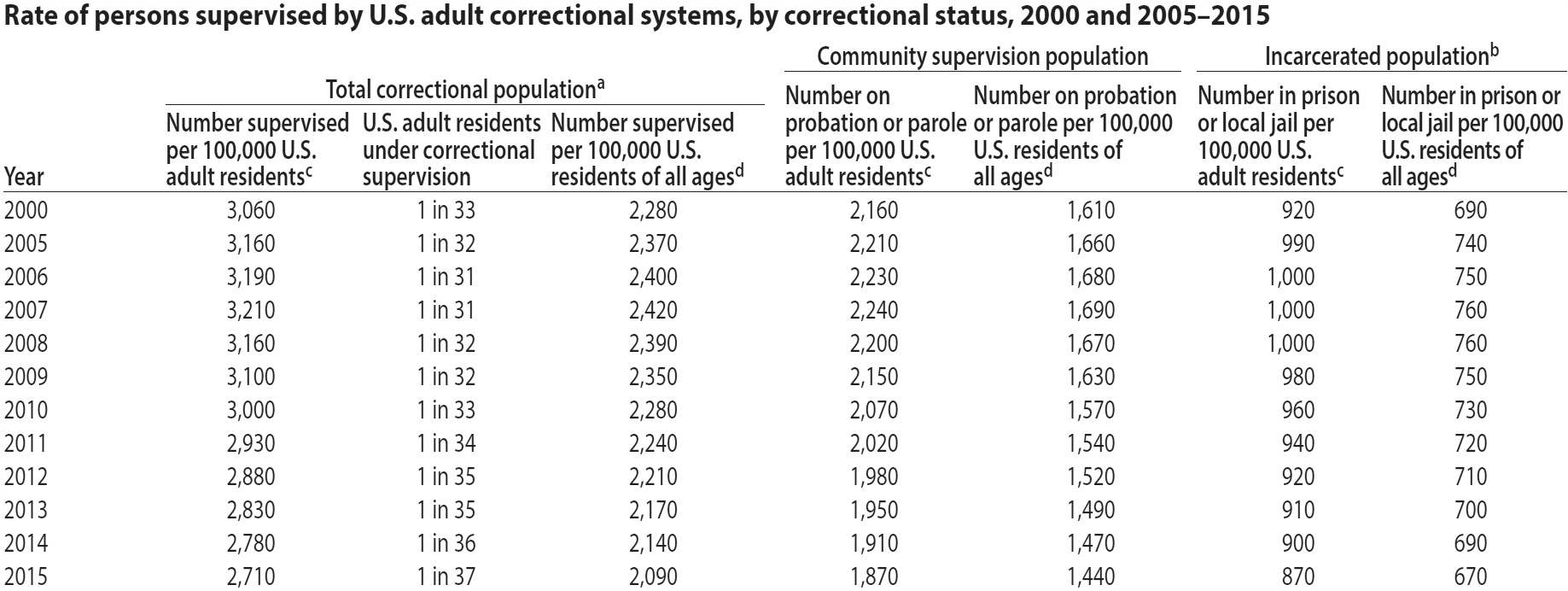
US incarceration and correctional population rates over time. The incarceration rate peaked in 2008.

Total U.S. incarceration (prisons and jails) peaked in 2008 at 2.31 million. Total correctional population peaked in 2007 at 7.34 million: in prison, jail, on probation, or on parole (released from prison with restrictions). See Bureau of Justice Statistics table to the right after the graph.

Counting all inmates (not just those in prisons and jails) brings the number at the beginning of 2008 to 2.42 million inmates. This is by adding in inmates in U.S. territories, military facilities, U.S. Immigration and Customs Enforcement (ICE) owned and contracted facilities (immigration detention), jails in Indian country, and juvenile facilities. That means the United States had around 24.7% of the world's 9.8 million prisoners. See chart below:

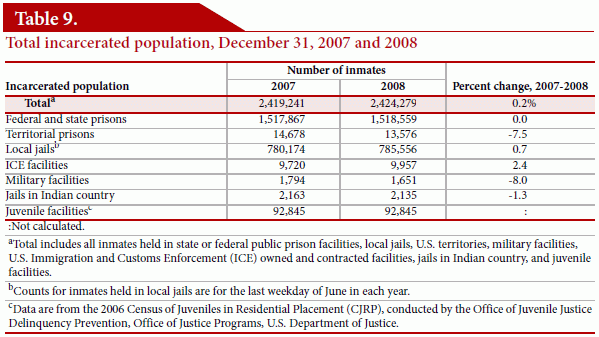

A Pew report released February 28, 2008 indicated that more than 1 in 100 adults in the United States were in prison or jail at the beginning of 2008:

With 1,596,127 in state or federal prison custody, and another 723,131 in local jails, the total adult inmate count at the beginning of 2008 stood at 2,319,258. With the number of adults just shy of 230 million, the actual incarceration rate is 1 in every 99.1 adults.

In 2008, the United States had the highest documented incarceration rate in the world, at 760 per 100,000. However, following over a decade of decarceration, the prison and jail population declined from a 2008 peak of 2.3 million to 1.7 million (505 per 100,000) in 2020.

== Growth and subsequent decline ==
US incarceration count, and rate per 100,000 population. Jails, state and federal prisons. No juvenile facilities. World Prison Brief.
Year	Count	Rate
1940	264,834	201
1950	264,620	176
1960	346,015	193
1970	328,020	161
1980	503,586	220
1985	744,208	311
1990	1,148,702	457
1995	1,585,586	592
2000	1,937,482	683
2002	2,033,022	703
2004	2,135,335	725
2006	2,258,792	752
2008	2,307,504	755
2010	2,270,142	731
2012	2,228,424	707
2014	2,217,947	693
2016	2,157,800	666
2018	2,102,400	642
2020	1,675,400	505
2021	1,767,200	531
2022	1,808,100	541

In the last quarter of the twentieth century, the incarceration rate in the US increased by 325 percent. Between the years 2001 and 2012, crime rates (both property and violent crimes) have declined 22% after already falling 30% in years prior between 1991 and 2001. In 2012, 710 out of every 100,000 U.S. residents were imprisoned in either local jails, state prisons, federal prisons, or privately operated facilities, representing close to a quarter of the global prison population.

The Bureau of Justice Statistics has released a study which finds that, despite the total number of prisoners incarcerated for drug-related offenses increasing by 57,000 between 1997 and 2004, the proportion of drug offenders to total prisoners in State prison populations stayed steady at 21%. The percentage of Federal prisoners serving time for drug offenses declined from 63% in 1997 to 55% in that same period. In the twenty-five years since the passage of the Anti-Drug Abuse Act of 1986, the United States penal population rose from around 300,000 to more than two million. Between 1986 and 1991, African-American women's incarceration in state prisons for drug offenses increased by 828 percent.

In 2009, the U.S. Department of Justice announced that the growth rate of the state prison population had fallen to its lowest since 2006, but it still had a 0.2% growth-rate compared to the total U.S. prison population. The California state prison system population fell in 2009, the first year that populations had fallen in 38 years.

When looking at specific populations within the criminal justice system the growth rates are vastly different. In 1977, there were just slightly more than eleven thousand incarcerated women. By 2004, the number of women under state or federal prison had increased by 757 percent, to more than 111,000, and the percentage of women in prison has increased every year, at roughly double the rate of men, since 2000. The rate of incarcerated women has expanded at about 4.6% annually between 1995 and 2005 with women now accounting for 7% of the population in state and federal prisons.

== Comparison with other countries ==
In comparison to countries with similar percentages of immigrants, Germany has an incarceration rate of 67 per 100,000 population (as of June 2022), Italy is 97 per 100,000 (as of November 2022), and Saudi Arabia is 207 per 100,000 (as of 2017). When compared to other countries with a zero tolerance policy for illegal drugs, the rate of Russia is 304 per 100,000 (as of November 2022), Kazakhstan is 184 per 100,000 (as of July 2022), Singapore is 169 per 100,000 (as of December 2021), and Sweden is 74 per 100,000 (as of January 2022).

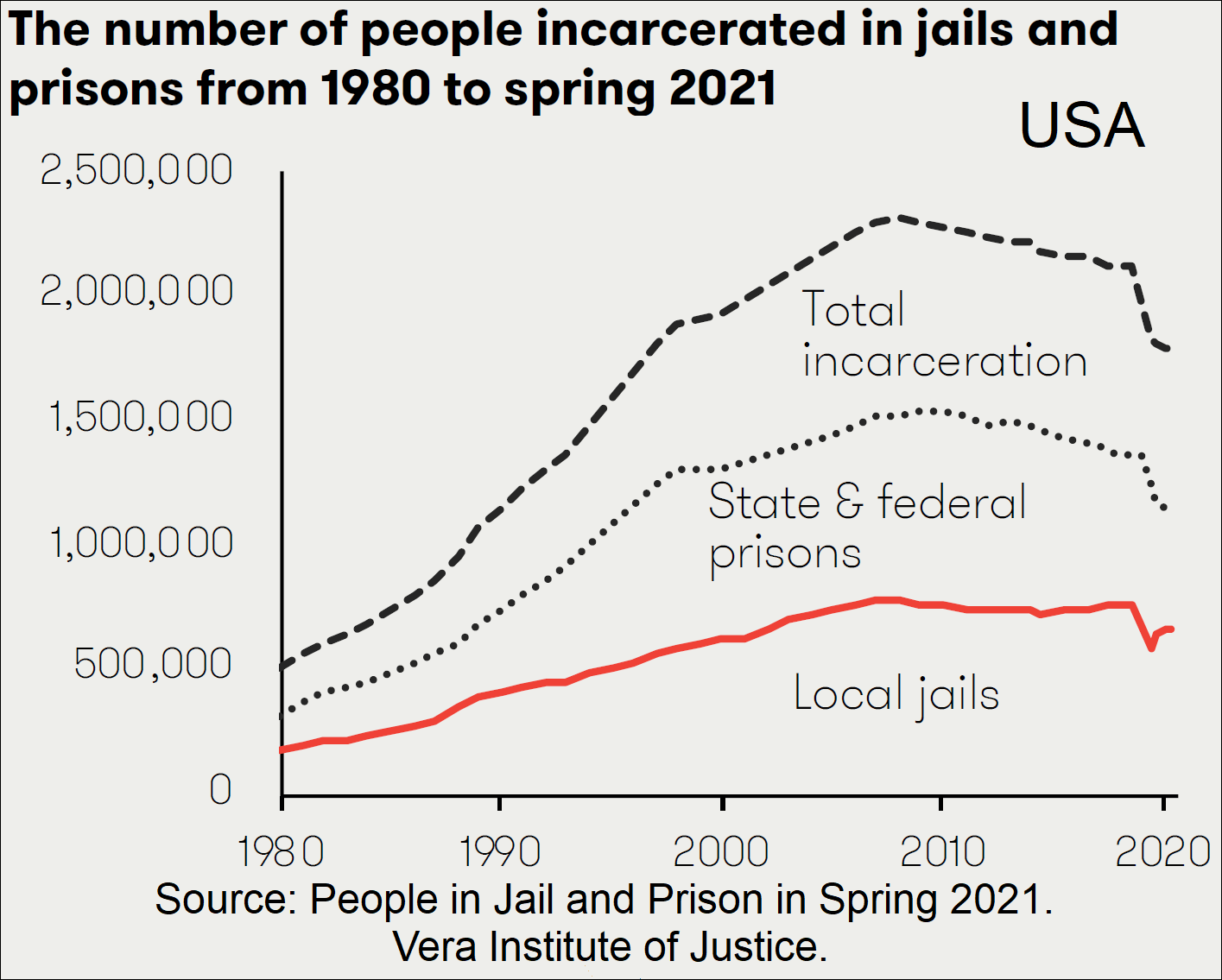
US timeline graph of number of people incarcerated in jails and prisons

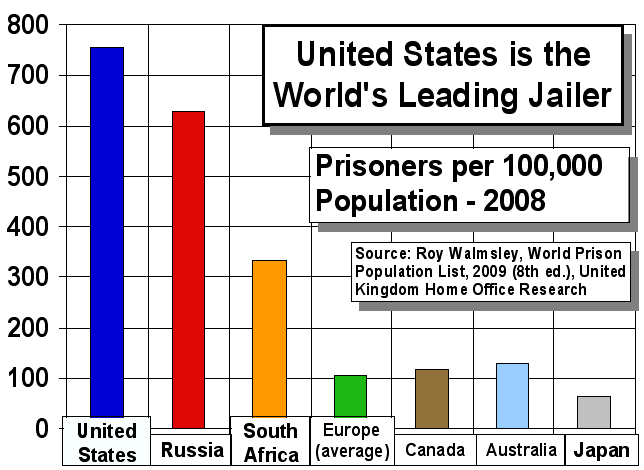
Prisoners per 100,000 population, December 2008.

== Causes ==
Correctional populations in the United States 1980–2013

2009. Percent of adult males incarcerated by race and ethnicity.

A 2014 report by the National Research Council identified two main causes of the increase in the United States' incarceration rate over the previous 40 years: longer prison sentences and increases in the likelihood of imprisonment. The same report found that longer prison sentences were the main driver of increasing incarceration rates since 1990.

=== Increased sentencing laws ===
Even though there are other countries that commit more inmates to prison annually, the fact that the United States keeps their prisoners longer causes the total rate to become higher. To give an example, the average burglary sentence in the United States is 16 months, compared to 5 months in Canada and 7 months in England.

Looking at reasons for imprisonment will further clarify why the incarceration rate and length of sentences are so high. The practice of imposing longer prison sentences on repeat offenders is common in many countries, but the three-strikes laws in the U.S. with mandatory 25-year imprisonment— implemented in many states in the 1990s— are statutes enacted by state governments in the United States which mandate state courts to impose harsher sentences on habitual offenders who are previously convicted of two prior serious criminal offenses and then commit a third.

The Violent Crime Control and Law Enforcement Act of 1994 may have had a minor effect on mass incarceration.

=== Economic and age contributions ===
Crime rates in low-income areas are much higher than in middle to high class areas. As a result, incarceration rates in low-income areas are much higher than in wealthier areas due to these high crime rates. When the incarcerated or criminal is a youth, there is a significant impact on the individual and rippling effects on entire communities. Social capital is lost when an individual is incarcerated. How much social capital is lost is hard to accurately estimate, however Aizer and Doyle found a strong positive correlation between lower income as an adult if an individual is incarcerated in their youth in comparison to those who are not incarcerated. 63 percent to 66 percent of those involved in crimes are under the age of thirty. People incarcerated at a younger age lose the capability to invest in themselves and in their communities. Their children and families become susceptible to financial burden preventing them from escaping low-income communities. This contributes to the recurring cycle of poverty that is positively correlated with incarceration. Poverty rates have not been curbed despite steady economic growth. Poverty is not the sole dependent variable for increasing incarceration rates. Incarceration leads to more incarceration by putting families and communities at a dynamic social disadvantage.

=== Drug sentencing laws ===
U.S. prisoners (excluding jails) as a percent of the population: male (dashed red), combined (solid black), female (dotted green)

The "war on drugs" is a policy that was initiated by Richard Nixon with the Comprehensive Drug Abuse Prevention and Control Act of 1970 and vigorously pursued by Ronald Reagan. By 2010, drug offenders in federal prison had increased to 500,000 per year, up from 41,000 in 1985. According to Michelle Alexander, drug related charges accounted for more than half the rise in state prisoners between 1985 and 2000. 31 million people have been arrested on drug related charges, approximately 1 in 10 Americans. In contrast, John Pfaff of Fordham Law School has accused Alexander of exaggerating the influence of the war on drugs on the rise in the United States' incarceration rate: according to him, the percent of state prisoners whose primary offense was drug-related peaked at 22% in 1990. The Brookings Institution reconciles the differences between Alexander and Pfaff by explaining two ways to look at the prison population as it relates to drug crimes, concluding "The picture is clear: Drug crimes have been the predominant reason for new admissions into state and federal prisons in recent decades" and "rolling back the war on drugs would not, as Pfaff and Urban Institute scholars maintain, totally solve the problem of mass incarceration, but it could help a great deal, by reducing exposure to prison."

As of December 2017, only 14.4% of state prisoners were serving sentences for a drug offenses with 3.7% of serving for possession and 10.8% serving for trafficking, other drug offenses, and unspecified drug offenses. Time served for drug related offenses are also among the shortest with prisoners released in 2016 having served an average sentence length 22 months while the median time served only 14 months.

After the passage of Reagan's Anti-Drug Abuse Act in 1986, incarceration for non-violent offenses dramatically increased. The Act imposed the same five-year mandatory sentence on those with convictions involving crack as on those possessing 100 times as much powder cocaine. This had a disproportionate effect on low-level street dealers and users of crack, who were more commonly poor blacks, Latinos, the young, and women.

Courts were given more discretion in sentencing by the Kimbrough v. United States (2007) decision, and the disparity was decreased to 18:1 by the Fair Sentencing Act of 2010.

By 2003, 58% of all women in federal prison were convicted of drug offenses. Black and Hispanic women in particular have been disproportionately affected by the war on drugs. Since 1986, incarceration rates have risen by 400% for women of all races, while rates for Black women have risen by 800%. Formerly incarcerated Black women are also most negatively impacted by the collateral legal consequences of conviction.

According to the American Civil Liberties Union, "Even when women have minimal or no involvement in the drug trade, they are increasingly caught in the ever-widening net cast by current drug laws, through provisions of the criminal law such as those involving conspiracy, accomplice liability, and constructive possession that expand criminal liability to reach partners, relatives and bystanders."

These new policies also disproportionately affect African-American women. According to Dorothy E. Roberts, the explanation is that poor women, who are disproportionately black, are more likely to be placed under constant supervision by the State to receive social services. They are then more likely to be caught by officials who are instructed to look specifically for drug offenses. Roberts argues that the criminal justice system's creation of new crimes has a direct effect on the number of women, especially black women, who then become incarcerated.

=== Racialization ===
One of the first laws in the U.S. against drugs was the Smoking Opium Exclusion Act of 1909. It prohibited the smoking of opium, which was ingested but not smoked by a substantial portion of White housewives in the United States. It was smoked mainly by Asian American immigrants coming to build the railroads. These immigrants were targeted with anti-Asian sentiment, as many voters believed they were losing jobs to Asian immigrants.

==== Disproportionate incarceration of black and Hispanic people ====
In the early 2000s, the U.S. was at its highest rate of imprisonment in history, with young Black men experiencing the highest levels of incarceration. One out of every 15 people imprisoned across the world is a Black American incarcerated in the United States. A 2004 study reported that the majority of people sentenced to prison in the United States are Black, and almost one-third of Black men in their twenties are either on parole, on probation, or in prison. These disproportionate levels of imprisonment have made incarceration a normalized occurrence for African-American communities. This has resulted in distrust from Black individuals towards aspects of the legal system such as police, courts, and heavy sentences. In 2011, more than 580,000 Black men and women were in state or federal prison. Black men and women are imprisoned at higher rates compared to all other age groups, with the highest rate being Black men aged 25 to 39. In 2001, almost 17% of Black men had previously been imprisoned in comparison to 2.6% of White men. By the end of 2002, of the two million inmates of the U.S. incarceration system, Black men surpassed the number of White men (586,700 to 436,800 respectively of inmates with sentences more than one year). Becky Petit and Carmen Gutierrez performed a study, published on October 29, 2018, on the incarceration rate of young African Americans, noting that 48.9% of men arrested by age 23 (born 1980–1984), were African American, while 37.9% were white.

However, in the 21st century, the incarceration rates for African American and Hispanic American women have declined, while incarceration rates have increased for white women. Between 2000 and 2017, the incarceration rate for white women increased by 44%, while at the same time declining by 55% for African American women. The Sentencing Project reports that by 2021, incarceration rates had declined by 70% for African American women, while rising by 7% for white women.

In 2017, the Washington Post reported that white women's incarceration rate was growing faster than ever before, as the rate for black women declined. The incarceration rate of African American males is also falling sharply, even faster than white men's incarceration rate, contrary to the popular opinion that black males are increasingly incarcerated.

The war on drugs played a role in the disproportionate amount of incarcerated African-Americans. Despite a general decline in crime, the massive increase in new inmates due to drug offenses ensured historically high incarceration rates during the 1990s, with New York City serving as an example. Drug-related arrests continued to increase in the city despite a near 50% drop in felony crimes.

A significant contributing factor to these figures are the racially and economically segregated neighborhoods that account for the majority of the Black prison population. These neighborhoods are normally impoverished and possess a high minority population. For example, as many as one in eight adult males who inhabit these urban areas is sent to prison each year, and one in four of these men is in prison on any given day. A 1992 study revealed that 72% of all New York State's prisoners came from only 7 of New York City's 55 community districts. Upon release from prison, the most common area that African Americans return to is a poor, impoverished neighborhood.

Finding employment post-release is a significant struggle for African Americans. American sociologist Devah Pager performed a study to prove this. She assembled pairs of fake job seekers to find jobs with résumés that portrayed the applicant had a criminal record. The findings indicated that the presence of a criminal record reduced callbacks by approximately 50%. Hispanic women with a prison record fared most favorably in receiving a phone call back from potential employers, while African American women had modest results, with white women receiving the poorest results, obtaining the lowest probability of receiving a phone call from a potential employer.

Unemployment rates impacted the body of African Americans that would take up prisons. The young African Americans who have found themselves as unemployed are found to be incarcerated at a higher rate than unemployed white people, as a result of drug usage.

=== Prison privatization ===
In the 1980s, the rising number of people incarcerated as a result of the war on drugs and the wave of privatization that occurred under the Reagan administration saw the emergence of the for-profit prison industry. Although modern private prisons did not exist in the US prior to the 1980s, the concept of private prisons can be found within the United States as early as the 1800s. In 1844, Louisiana privatized its penitentiary when it allowed a private company to run the facility as a factory where prisoners were used to manufacture clothing.

In a 2011 report by the ACLU, it is claimed that the rise of the for-profit prison industry is a "major contributor" to "mass incarceration," along with bloated state budgets. Louisiana, for example, has the highest rate of incarceration in the world with the majority of its prisoners being housed in privatized, for-profit facilities. Such institutions could face bankruptcy without a steady influx of prisoners. A 2013 Bloomberg report states that in the past decade the number of inmates in for-profit prisons throughout the U.S. rose 44 percent.

Corporations who operate prisons, such as CoreCivic (formerly the Corrections Corporation of America) and the GEO Group, spend significant amounts of money lobbying the federal government along with state governments. The two aforementioned companies, the largest in the industry, have been contributors to the American Legislative Exchange Council (ALEC), which seeks to expand the privatization of corrections and lobbies for policies that would increase incarceration, such as three-strike laws and "truth-in-sentencing" legislation. Prison companies also sign contracts with states that guarantee at least 90 percent of prison beds be filled. If these "lockup quotas" are not met, the state must reimburse the prison company for the unused beds. Prison companies use the profits to expand and put pressure on lawmakers to incarcerate a certain number of people. This influence on the government by the private prison industry has been referred to as the prison–industrial complex.

The industry is well aware of what reduced crime rates could mean to their bottom line. This from the CCA's SEC report in 2010:

Our growth … depends on a number of factors we cannot control, including crime rates … [R]eductions in crime rates … could lead to reductions in arrests, convictions and sentences requiring incarceration at correctional facilities.

In January 2021, U.S. President Joe Biden signed an executive order directing the Department of Justice (DOJ) to begin phasing out its contracts with private federal prisons.

As of March 2021, the private prison population of the United States has seen a 16% decline since reaching its peak in 2012 with 137,000 people incarcerated. According to a March 2021 report released by The Sentencing Project, 115,428 people were incarcerated in private prisons in the US, representing 8% of the total state and federal prison population.

=== Editorial policies of major media ===
Gallup polling since 1989 has found that in most years in which there was a decline in the U.S. crime rate, a majority of Americans said that violent crime was getting worse.

A substantial body of research claims that incarceration rates are primarily a function of media editorial policies, largely unrelated to the actual crime rate. Constructing Crime: Perspectives on Making News and Social Problems is a book collecting together papers on this theme. The researchers say that the jump in incarceration rate from 0.1% to 0.5% of the United States population from 1975 to 2000 (documented in the figure above) was driven by changes in the editorial policies of the mainstream commercial media and is unrelated to any actual changes in crime. Media consolidation reduced competition on content. That allowed media company executives to maintain substantially the same audience while slashing budgets for investigative journalism and filling the space from the police blotter, which tended to increase and stabilize advertising revenue. It is safer, easier and cheaper to write about crimes committed by poor people than the wealthy. Poor people can be libeled with impunity, but major advertisers can materially impact the profitability of a commercial media organization by reducing their purchases of advertising space with that organization.

News media thrive on feeding frenzies (such as missing white women) because they tend to reduce production costs while simultaneously building an audience interested in the latest development in a particular story. It takes a long time for a reporter to learn enough to write intelligently about a specific issue. Once a reporter has achieved that level of knowledge, it is easier to write subsequent stories. However, major advertisers have been known to spend their advertising budgets through different channels when they dislike the editorial policies. Therefore, a media feeding frenzy focusing on an issue of concern to an advertiser may reduce revenue and profits.

Sacco described how "competing news organizations responded to each other's coverage [while] the police, in their role as gatekeepers of crime news, reacted to the increased media interest by making available more stories that reflected and reinforced" a particular theme. "[T]he dynamics of competitive journalism created a media feeding frenzy that found news workers 'snatching at shocking numbers' and 'smothering reports of stable or decreasing use under more ominous headlines.'"

The reasons cited above for increased incarcerations (US racial demographics, Increased sentencing laws, and Drug sentencing laws) have been described as consequences of the shift in editorial policies of the mainstream media.

Additionally, media coverage has been proven to have a profound impact on criminal sentencing. Beale found that the more media attention a criminal case is given, the greater the incentive for prosecutors and judges to pursue harsher sentences. This is directly linked to the enormous increase in media coverage of crime over the past two decades. While crime decreased by 8% between 1992 and 2002, news reports on crime increased by 800% and the average prison sentence length increased by 2,000% for all crimes. Less media coverage means a greater chance of a lighter sentence or that the defendant may avoid prison time entirely.

== See also ==
- List of countries by incarceration rate
- Comparison of United States incarceration rate with other countries
- Felony disenfranchisement § In the United States
- Incarceration in the United States
- List of U.S. states by incarceration rate
- Mass incarceration
- Mentally ill people in United States jails and prisons
- Prison–industrial complex
- Race and the war on drugs
- Youth incarceration in the United States
- Decarceration in the United States
