= Violent Crime Control and Law Enforcement Act =

1994 U.S. federal law

Violent Crime Control and Law Enforcement Act of 1994
- Long title: An Act to Control and Prevent Crime
- Nicknames: 1994 Crime Bill
- Enacted by: the 103rd United States Congress

Citations
- Public law: Pub. L. 103–322
- Statutes at Large: 108 Stat. 1796

Codification
- Titles amended: 12 U.S.C.: Banks and Banking 18 U.S.C.: Crimes and Criminal Procedure 42 U.S.C.: Public Health and Social Welfare
- U.S.C. sections created: 42 U.S.C. ch. 136

Legislative history
- Introduced in the House as H.R. 3355 by Jack Brooks (D–TX) on October 26, 1993; Committee consideration by House Judiciary; Passed the House on November 3, 1993 (voice vote); Passed the Senate on November 19, 1993 (95–4, in lieu of S. 1607); Reported by the joint conference committee on August 10 and 21, 1994; agreed to by the House on August 21, 1994 (235–195) and by the Senate on August 25, 1994 (61–38); Signed into law by President Bill Clinton on September 13, 1994

The Violent Crime Control and Law Enforcement Act of 1994, commonly referred to as the 1994 Crime Bill, or the Clinton Crime Bill, is an act of Congress dealing with crime and law enforcement; it became law in 1994. It is the largest crime bill in the history of the United States, consisting of 356 pages that provided for 100,000 new police officers and $9.7 billion in funding for prisons which were designed with significant input from experienced police officers. Sponsored by U.S. Representative Jack Brooks of Texas, the bill was passed by Congress and signed into law by President Bill Clinton. Then-Senator Joe Biden of Delaware drafted the Senate version of the legislation in cooperation with the National Association of Police Organizations, also incorporating the Assault Weapons ban and the Violence Against Women Act (VAWA) with Senator Orrin Hatch.

The Violent Crime Prevention and Law Enforcement Act was first conceived by the government in the early 1990s, with Senator Joe Biden, then chairman of the Senate Judiciary Committee, playing a major role in drafting the law. Biden worked closely with law enforcement officials, especially the National Police Officers Association, due to his keenness to reduce crime and impose security and peace in the United States. Biden developed measures aimed at reducing crime by formulating some basic concepts on how to avoid crimes or punish criminals with severe penalties. He also added that when drafting the law, certain strategies should be used to help punish and rehabilitate prisoners. He also said that the National Association of Police Organizations played a major role in drafting the bill by formulating policies that were fully aligned with the priorities of law enforcement agencies across the United States. More deeply, the police, due to their many patrols in areas where crimes are rampant, helped reduce those risks because the police arrested a large percentage of drug dealers, gangs and criminals. Republicans argued that the bill would provide significant funding for crime prevention programs that purported to be social rehabilitation, while drug treatment programs and youth crime initiatives could cost the state much money but could be ineffective. They argued that punitive measures could be easier and more effective.

Following the 101 California Street shooting, the 1993 Waco Siege, and other high-profile instances of violent crime, the act expanded federal law in several ways. One of the most noted sections was the Federal Assault Weapons Ban. Other parts of the act provided for a greatly expanded federal death penalty, new classes of individuals banned from possessing firearms, and a variety of new crimes defined in statutes relating to hate crimes, sex crimes, and gang-related crime. The bill also required states to establish registries for sexual offenders by September 1997.

== Legislative history ==
During the 1992 presidential campaign, Bill Clinton sought to reposition the Democratic Party, which had previously been attacked as "soft on crime," as an advocate for "get-tough" policing strategies as well as investing in community policing. Federal funding for additional police and community policing were both priorities of the Democratic Leadership Council, of which Clinton was a member. In an announcement that the New York Times described as "a page from the Republican playbook," Clinton said on July 23, 1992:

We cannot take our country back until we take our neighborhoods back. Four years ago this crime issue was used to divide America. I want to use it to unite America. I want to be tough on crime and good for civil rights. You can't have civil justice without order and safety.

Clinton's platform, Putting People First, proposed to:

Fight crime by putting 100,000 new police officers on the streets. We will create a National Police Corps and offer unemployed veterans and active military personnel a chance to become law enforcement officers at home. We will also expand community policing, fund more drug treatment, and establish community boot camps to discipline first-time non-violent offenders.

Liberal Democrats opposed the law because they were very concerned about the mandatory minimum sentences, especially since the law added the three-strikes rule, which meant a life sentence for criminals who were convicted of three violent or drug crimes, pointing out that this would lead to an increase in the prison population, especially in mass prisons, as this would lead to overcrowding. On the other hand, the negative effects that the law produced when it eliminated the Pell grants for prisoners, as this move was met with strong opposition from Democrats, who argued that education is a tool for rehabilitation, and that eliminating these grants would reduce educational opportunities for prisoners, which would reduce their chances of rehabilitation and reintegration into society again after imprisonment.

The law was widely criticized by politicians, pointing out that this law would increase the authority of the federal government of the United States in matters of local law enforcement, which would have greatly affected marginalized communities, especially African American communities. Despite all the criticism that the law had gone through, it was passed in the House by voice vote on November 3, 1993, and passed in the Senate on November 19th by a vote of 95-4. One of the main reasons that the bill was eventually supported was due to the Congressional Black Caucus after their concerns of rising crime rates in their areas.

A majority of the Congressional Black Caucus voted for the bill. A Gallup survey in 1994 found that "58% of African Americans supported the crime bill, compared to 49% of white Americans." However, a 1993 poll from USA Today, CNN, and Gallup found that "an overwhelming number of Blacks believed that the criminal justice system treated Blacks more harshly than whites." Historian Michael Javen Fortner cites high crime rates as a likely cause of Black support of the bill as well as the bill's funding of crime prevention and rehabilitation programs. In August 1994, President Clinton worked to increase Democratic support on the bill and met with three Caucus members who had previously opposed the bill, convincing them that the bill was the best it could be. The bill was signed into law by President Clinton on September 13, 1994.

== Provisions ==
The Violent Crime Prevention and Law Enforcement Act of 1994 is one of the largest anti-crime bills in the history of the United States, as it includes many provisions whose primary goal is to address crime and add public safety to the community. One of the important provisions included in the anti-crime law is to increase law enforcement through numerous fundings provided by the US government. Through this funding, approximately 100,000 new police officers have been hired nationwide. This is done through a program that offers community-oriented police services. It can be said that this program has expanded police efforts in the community and shaped the relationship between police officers and civilians to work together to eliminate or reduce crime.

The anti-crime law also added a provision to expand the scope of federal crimes and penalties, as it introduced approximately 60 new crimes, indicating that these crimes require the death penalty, including terrorist murders, drug-trafficking, and drive-by shootings, in addition to the three-strikes law.

=== Federal Assault Weapons Ban ===
One of the important aspects of the law that caused much controversy in the United States, especially in the government, is the Federal Assault Weapons Ban, which prohibited the manufacture and transfer of certain types of semi-automatic firearms, and banned high-capacity magazines for civilian use. This particular provision was met with great opposition from the police, so a clause was added to this provision to prohibit the circulation of weapons between civilians, while allowing their manufacture and use for law enforcement. The duration of the ban was 10 years and ended in 2004. The ban took effect September 13, 1994, and expired on September 13, 2004, by a sunset provision. The ban was not renewed as the evidence on its effectiveness was inconclusive at best, it saw a short-term decrease in the use of assault weapons in violent crimes, but by an amount too small (17%) to be deemed conclusive, and did not reduce overall rates of gun violence. It also faced significant legal hurdles in being renewed due to its constitutional issues, with gun rights groups citing the very minor drop in criminal assault weapon use as proof that laws don't prevent criminals from obtaining weapons, and the inconclusive results on crime didn't justify infringing on the Second Amendment rights of law-abiding Americans. It also faced criticism for the ban's poorly written definitions, as the guns it banned as assault weapons only had the appearance of a military assault rifle, but in terms of function were identical to many rifles that were legal during the ban and commonly used for target shooting and hunting, which the average person not familiar with firearms didn't consider to be an assault rifle, and when surveyed many people incorrectly believed the civilian semi-automatic AR-15 was exactly the same as the fully automatic military M4 carbine. Since the expiration date, there is no federal ban on the subject firearms or magazines capable of holding more than ten rounds of ammunition.

=== Violence Against Women Act ===
In order to crack down on crimes against women, namely violent and sexual crimes, a provision was added to the act entitled the Violence Against Women Act (VAWA), which provided $1.6 billion to programs aimed at preventing and treating domestic violence and sexual violence that women are exposed to annually. This law also added provisions to establish centers for the psychological and physical rehabilitation of women to relieve them of the impacts of rape and domestic violence. In addition, the government invested $9.7 billion to construct new prisons to prevent overcrowding as a result of this new provision's incarceration related efforts.

Part of VAWA was ruled unconstitutional by the Supreme Court in United States v. Morrison (2000).

=== Federal Death Penalty Act ===
Title VI, the Federal Death Penalty Act, created 60 new death penalty offenses under 41 federal capital statutes, for crimes related to acts of terrorism, non-homicidal narcotics offenses, murder of a federal law enforcement officer, civil rights-related murders, drive-by shootings resulting in death, the use of weapons of mass destruction resulting in death, and carjackings resulting in death.

The 1995 Oklahoma City bombing occurred a few months after this law came into effect, and the Antiterrorism and Effective Death Penalty Act of 1996 was passed in response, which further increased the federal death penalty. In 2001, Timothy McVeigh was executed for the murder of eight federal law enforcement agents under that title.

The Federal Death Penalty Act was declared unconstitutional in the case of U.S. v Quinones, ruling that the act presented an "undue risk of executing innocent people". This decision was reversed on appeal, allowing its continued use. However, the death penalty for non-homicidal crimes was abolished nationwide in 2008.

=== Elimination of higher education for inmates ===
One of the more controversial provisions of the Violent Crime Control and Law Enforcement Act overturned a section of the Higher Education Act of 1965 permitting prison inmates to receive a Pell Grant for higher education while they were incarcerated. The amendment is as follows:

(a) IN GENERAL- Section 401(b)(8) of the Higher Education Act of 1965 (20 U.S.C. 1070a(b)(8)) is amended to read as follows: (8) No basic grant shall be awarded under this subpart to any individual who is incarcerated in any Federal or State penal institution.

The VCCLEA effectively eliminated the ability of lower-income prison inmates to receive college educations during their term of imprisonment, thus ensuring the education level of most inmates remains unimproved over the period of their incarceration.

The Consolidated Appropriations Act, 2021, signed into law on December 27, 2020, restored the ability of incarcerated students to receive Pell Grants beginning July 1, 2023 The ability to obtain Pell Grants would also be greatly strengthened under at the federal level under the Federal Student Aid (FAFSA) Simplification Act of 2022.

=== Driver's Privacy Protection Act ===
Title XXX, the Driver's Privacy Protection Act, governs the privacy and disclosure of personal information gathered by the states' Departments of Motor Vehicles. The law was passed in 1994; it was introduced by Jim Moran in 1992 after an increase in opponents of abortion rights using public driving license databases to track down and harass abortion providers and patients, most notably by both besieging Susan Wicklund's home for a month and following her daughter to school.

=== Jacob Wetterling Crimes Against Children and Sexually Violent Offender Registration Act ===
Under Title XVII, known as the Jacob Wetterling Crimes Against Children and Sexually Violent Offender Registration Act, guidelines were established for states to track sex offenders. States had also been required to track sex offenders by confirming their place of residence annually for ten years after their release into the community or quarterly for the rest of their lives if the sex offender was convicted of a violent sex crime. The Wetterling Act was later amended in 1996 with Megan's Law, which permanently required states to give public disclosure of sex offenders. In 2006, the Wetterling Act's state registers was replaced with a federal register through the Adam Walsh Child Protection and Safety Act.

=== Community Oriented Policing Services ===
Since 1994, the COPS Office has provided $30 billion in assistance to state and local law enforcement agencies to help hire community policing officers. The COPS Office also funds the research and development of guides, tools and training, and provides technical assistance to police departments implementing community policing principles. The law authorized the COPS Office to hire 100,000 more police officers to patrol the nation's streets.

=== Violent Offender Incarceration and Truth-in-Sentencing Incentive Grants Program ===
Title II of the Violent Crime Control and Law Enforcement Act of 1994 provided incentive grants to build and expand correctional facilities to qualifying states that enforced mandatory sentencing of 85% of a person's sentence conviction. "One purpose of theVOI/TIS incentive grants," the Bureau reported, "is to enable States to manage prison capacity by providing funds to increase prison beds for violent offenders."

=== Other provisions ===
The act authorized the initiation of "boot camps" for delinquent minors and allocated a substantial amount of money to build new prisons.

Fifty new federal offenses were added, including provisions making membership in gangs a crime. Some argued that these provisions violated the guarantee of freedom of association in the Bill of Rights.The act did incorporate elements of H.R. 50 "Federal Bureau of Investigation First Amendment Protection Act of 1993" (into §2339A (c)) to prohibit investigations based purely on protected First Amendment activity, but this was effectively removed in the Antiterrorism and Effective Death Penalty Act of 1996.

The act also generally prohibits individuals who have been convicted of a felony involving breach of trust from working in the business of insurance, unless they have received written consent from state regulators.

The act also made drug testing mandatory for those serving on federal supervised release.

As a result of this act, the board decided that the Civil Rights Division should primarily control the work of internal affairs of Law Enforcements for possible reasons of bias, and as a precaution, the Internal Affairs member should cooperate with the Civil Rights Division as per the council's resolution.

The act prohibits "any person acting on behalf of a governmental authority, to engage in a pattern or practice ... that deprives persons of rights, privileges, or immunities secured or protected by the Constitution or laws of the United States." (Title XXI, Subtitle D.) Subtitle D further requires the United States Department of Justice to issue an annual report on "the use of excessive force by law enforcement officers." Such reports have not been issued, however.

The act included a three-strikes provision addressing repeat offenders.

The act expanded the scope of required FBI data to include hate crimes based on disability, and the FBI began collecting data on disability bias crimes on January 1, 1997.

== Legacy and impacts ==
The 1994 Crime Bill marked a shift in the politics of crime and policing in the United States. Sociologist and criminologist William R. Kelly states that, "While the longer-term impact of the Violent Crime Control and Law Enforcement Act of 1994 was questionable, the political impact was clear—crime control or 'tough on crime' became a bipartisan issue."

Total, Violent, and Property Crime Rates per 100,000 Persons, 1970–2001

Bill Clinton has claimed credit for the reduction in crime rates in the 1990s, stating that, "Because of that bill we had a 25-year low in crime, a 33-year low in the murder rate, and because of that and the background-check law, we had a 46-year low in deaths of people by gun violence." Crime rates underwent a long period of reduction beginning in 1991 and declined by 26% during this eight-year period. The primary reasons for this reduction remain a topic of debate. A study by the General Accounting Office found that grant funding from the Community Oriented Policing Services program supported the hiring of an estimated 17,000 additional officers in 2000, its peak year of impact, and increased additional employment by 89,000 officer-years from 1994 to 2001. This was an increase of 3% in the number of sworn officers in the United States. The GAO concluded that the COPS Office potentially had a modest impact in reducing crime, contributing to an approximate 5% reduction in overall crime rates from 1993 to 2001. A published study by criminologists John Worrell and Tomislav Kovandzic alleged that "COPS spending had little to no effect on crime."

Total U.S. incarceration by year

The Crime Bill has also become emblematic of a shift towards mass incarceration in the United States, although its contribution to the long-term trend of expanding prisons is debated. The Justice Policy Institute stated in 2008 that "the Clinton Administration's 'tough on crime' policies resulted in the largest increases in federal and state inmate populations of any president in American history". Jeremy Travis, former director of the National Institute of Justice, described the truth-in-sentencing provisions of the law as a catalyst: "Here's the federal government coming in and saying we'll give you money if you punish people more severely, and 28 states and the District of Columbia followed the money and enacted stricter sentencing laws for violent offenses." The act may have had a minor effect on mass incarceration and prison expansion. In 1998, twenty-seven states and the District of Columbia qualified for that Federal grant program. Thirteen more states adopted truth-in-sentencing law applying to some crimes or with a lower percentage threshold. By 1997, 69% of sentenced violent offenders were in states meeting the 85% "truth-in-sentencing" threshold and over 90% faced at least a 50% threshold. The Bureau of Justice Statistics projected in 1999 that, "As a result of truth-in-sentencing practices, the State prison population is expected to increase through the incarceration of more offenders for longer periods of time," and found that the State prison population had "increased by 57%" to "a high of 1,075,052 inmates" while the number of people sentenced to prison each year was only up by 17%. However, a GAO report found that federal incentives were "not a factor" in enacting truth in sentencing provisions in 12 of the 27 states that qualified, and "a key factor" in just four.

The 1994 Crime Bill was also just one in a trend of crime-prevention actions taken by the federal government in the latter part of the 20th Century, with significant expansions of prison facilities and incarceration already being seen by the start of Clinton's first term in 1993. Other government efforts cited as also contributing to the dramatic increase in prison population across the U.S. include the creation of the Drug Enforcement Administration under President Richard Nixon as part of his worldwide "war on drugs" campaign, and the Comprehensive Crime Control Act of 1984 under President Ronald Reagan.

The legal system relied on plea bargains to minimize the increased case load. Jerry Brown and Bill Clinton later expressed regret over the portions of the measure that led to increased prison population like the three-strikes provision.

== See also ==
- Incarceration in the United States
- United States incarceration rate
- Comparison of United States incarceration rate with other countries
