= Wicklund =

Wicklund is a surname. Notable people with the surname include:

- Arne H. Wicklund (1926–1990), American businessman, lawyer, jurist and legislator
- Erling Wicklund (born 1944), Norwegian jazz musician
- Hannah Wicklund, American singer-songwriter
- Ottar Wicklund (1911–1978), Norwegian actor
- Susan Wicklund (born 1954), American abortion provider
