= Vivien Stern, Baroness Stern =

British Baroness (born 1941)

The Right Honourable The Baroness Stern CBE
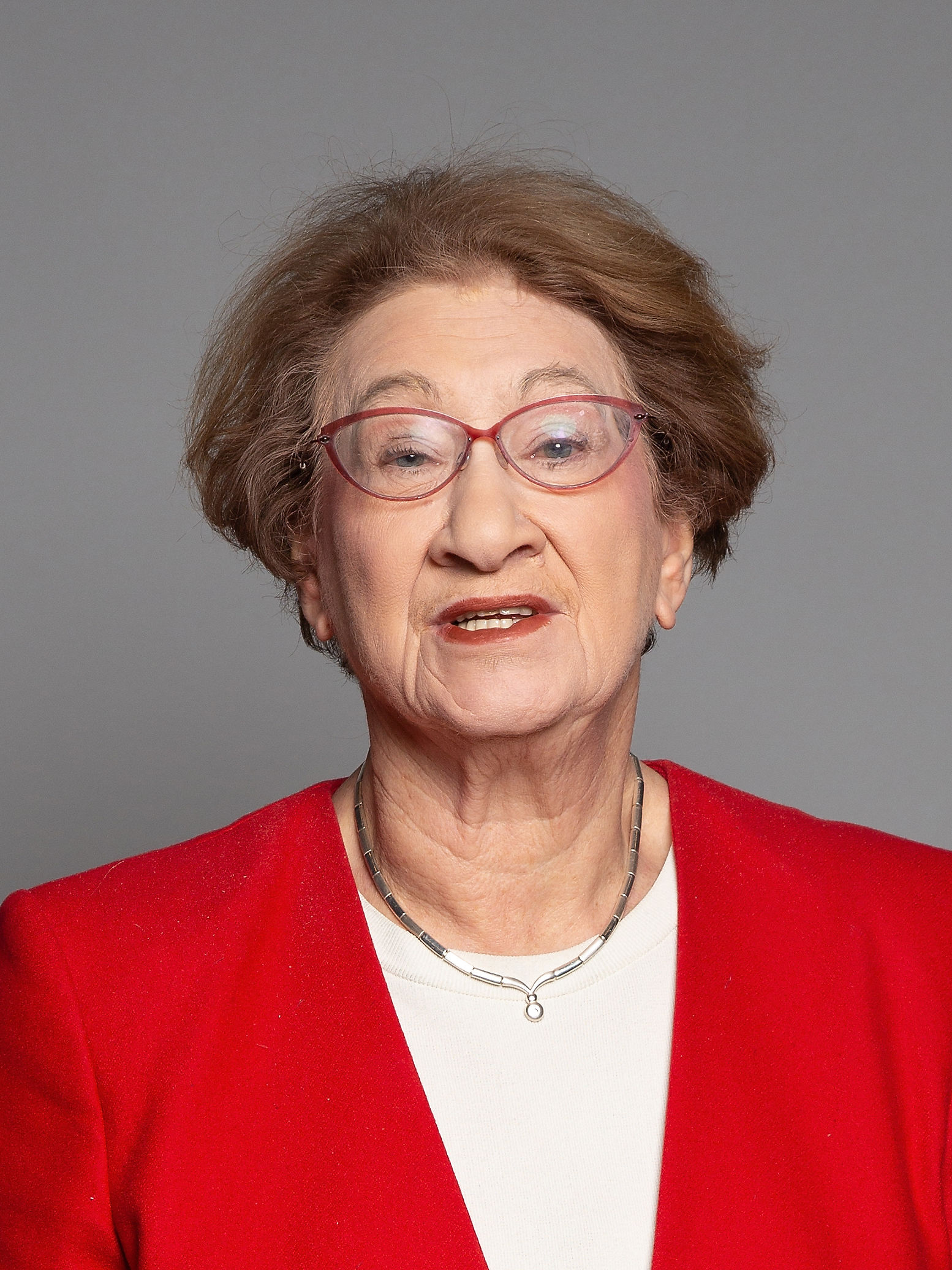

Member of the House of Lords
- Lord Temporal
- Life peerage 13 July 1999 – 2 December 2025

Personal details
- Born: 25 September 1941 (age 84)
- Party: Crossbench
- Spouse: Professor Andrew Coyle

Vivien Helen Stern, Baroness Stern CBE (born 25 September 1941) is a crossbench member of the House of Lords.

Stern was educated at Kent College and read English literature at Bristol University where she graduated in 1963. She was awarded an MLitt in 1964 and a Certificate in Education in 1965. Between 1967 and 1969 she taught General Studies at Birmingham College of Food and Domestic Arts.

In 1970 she became a lecturer in education, and in 1977 became the director of NACRO, a post she held until 1996. She was a visiting fellow of Nuffield College, Oxford, from 1984 to 1991, and was Secretary General of Penal Reform International from 1989 until 2006. In 1997 she was appointed a senior research fellow of London University, based at the International Centre for Prison Studies in King's College London.

She was appointed a Commander of the Order of the British Empire (CBE) in the 1992 New Year Honours and was created a Life Peer as Baroness Stern, of Vauxhall in the London Borough of Lambeth on 13 July 1999. She has been a member of several parliamentary committees and is currently a member of the Parliamentary Joint Committee on Statutory Instruments. She lists her political interests as criminal justice, foreign affairs, human rights, international development, penal reform, and prisons, and has written several books, including Creating Criminals: prisons and people in a market society; Bricks of Shame: Britain's prisons; Failures in Penal Policy; Imprisoned by Our Prisons: a programme for reform (Fabian Series); The Prisons We Deserve and A Sin Against the Future: imprisonment in the world.

Baroness Stern is a patron of several charities including the Venture Trust, the Prisoners' Education Trust, and Clean Break.

She has honorary doctorates from the University of Kent, Bristol University, Oxford Brookes University, the University of Stirling, the University of Glasgow and the University of Edinburgh and is an Honorary Fellow of the London School of Economics. She is married to Professor Andrew Coyle.

In 2010, Baroness Stern carried out a review on how public authorities in England and Wales handled complaints of rape and sexual violence. In 2021, she took part in a panel held by the Home Affairs Committee to look at how findings in the review had led to changes in how cases are handled.
