= Comparison of United States incarceration rate with other countries =

Comparison of the incarceration rate of the United States with other countries

Prison population rate. Includes jails too. Click to see yearly slider. Go to reference to hover a country for rate, year, and rate-per-year graph.

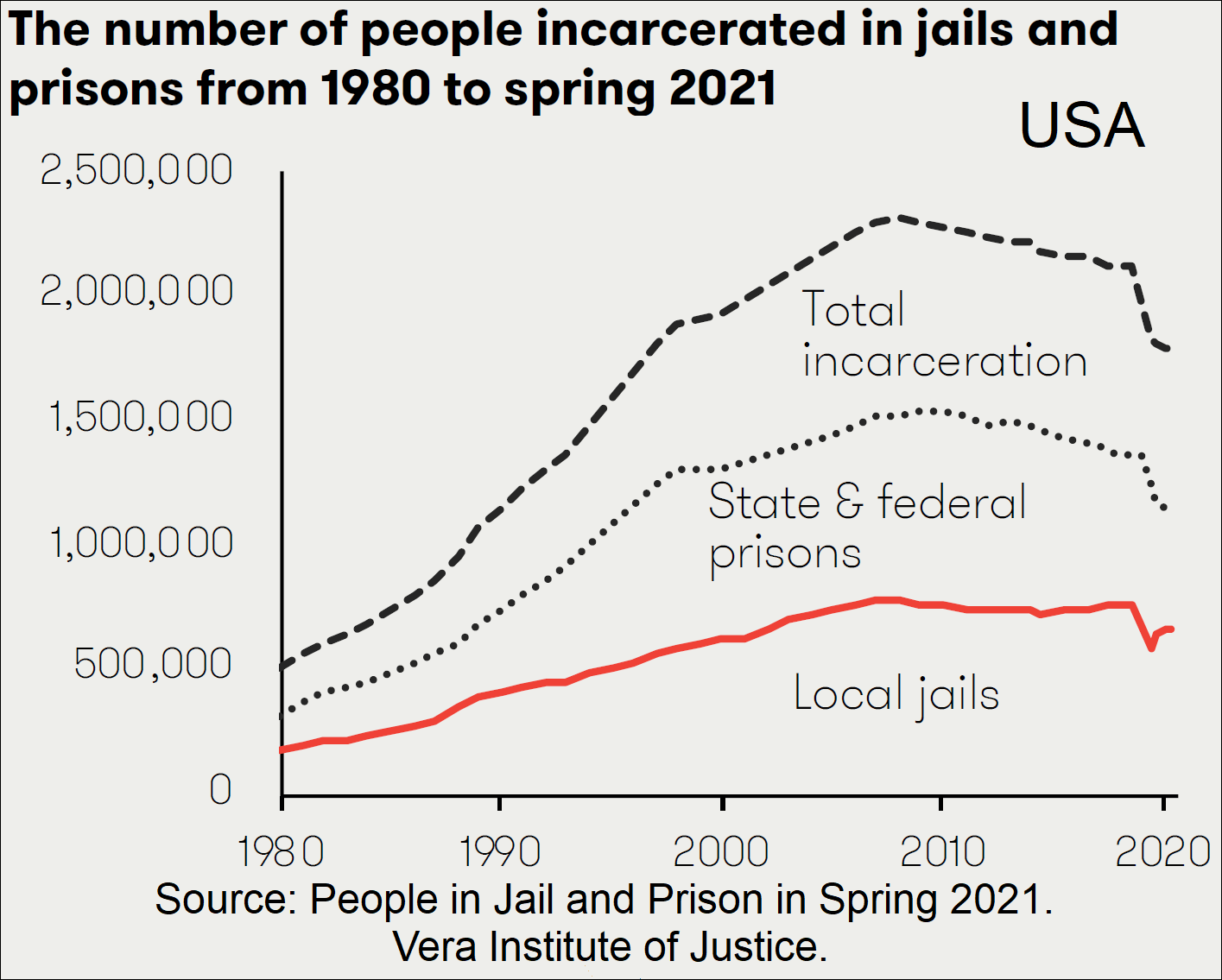
US timeline graphs of number of people incarcerated in jails and prisons.

US incarceration count, and rate per 100,000 population. Jails, state prisons, federal prisons.
Year	Count	Rate
1940	264,834	201
1950	264,620	176
1960	346,015	193
1970	328,020	161
1980	503,586	220
1985	744,208	311
1990	1,148,702	457
1995	1,585,586	592
2000	1,937,482	683
2002	2,033,022	703
2004	2,135,335	725
2006	2,258,792	752
2008	2,307,504	755
2010	2,270,142	731
2012	2,228,424	707
2014	2,217,947	693
2016	2,157,800	666
2018	2,102,400	642
2020	1,675,400	505
2021	1,767,200	531
2022	1,808,100	541
2023	1,833,700	542

In 2023, the United States had 1,833,700 inmates in adult facilities (prisons and jails), at a rate of 542 per 100,000 population. That was the 4th highest rate in the world in 2023. According to the World Prison Population List (11th edition) there were around 10.35 million people in penal institutions worldwide in 2015. The US had 2,173,800 prisoners in adult facilities in 2015. That means the US held 21.0% of the world's prisoners in 2015, even though the US represented only around 4.4 percent of the world's population in 2015. In 2015 the US had the 2nd highest incarceration rate (698), behind the Seychelles rate of 799 per 100,000.

Comparing English-speaking developed countries; the incarceration rate of Canada was 85 per 100,000 (as of 2020), England and Wales was 146 per 100,000 (as of 2023), and Australia was 158 per 100,000 (as of 2022).

Comparing other developed countries, the rate of Spain was 113 per 100,000 (as of 2023), France was 109 per 100,000 (as of 2023), Germany was 67 per 100,000 (as of 2022), Norway was 53 per 100,000 (as of 2023), Netherlands was 65 per 100,000 (as of 2022), Japan was 36 per 100,000 (as of 2021), Sweden was 82 per 100,000 (as of 2023), and Italy was 99 per 100,000 (as of 2023),

Comparing other countries with harsh sentencing for illegal drugs, Saudi Arabia was 140 per 100,000 (as of 2019), Iran was 288 per 100,000 (as of 2020), Kuwait was 101 per 100,000 (as of 2023), and Singapore was 156 per 100,000 (as of 2022).

China's latest official number (2018) of 1,690,000 (sentenced prisoners only) means the rate was 119 per 100,000. According to the World Prison Brief the total number in China would be much higher if pre-trial detainees and those being held in administrative detention were added, and even higher when including the large number of Uyghurs being held in re-education camps.

== U.S. incarceration rate peaked in 2008 ==
Total US incarceration (prisons and jails) peaked in 2008. On January 1, 2008, more than 1 in 100 adults in the United States were in prison or jail. 2.3 million people (see table to right). Total correctional population (prison, jail, probation, parole) peaked in 2007.

According to the eighth edition of the World Prison Population List the 2008 US rate of 765 per 100,000 was the highest in the world, followed by Russia (629), Rwanda (604), St Kitts & Nevis (588), Cuba (c.531), U.S. Virgin Is. (512), British Virgin Is. (488), Palau (478), Belarus (468), Belize (455), Bahamas (422), Georgia (415), American Samoa (410), Grenada (408) and Anguilla (401). Its number of 2.29 million US inmates out of 9.8 million worldwide means the US held 23.4% of the world's inmates.

A 2008 article in The New York Times said that "it is the length of sentences that truly distinguishes American prison policy. Indeed, the mere number of sentences imposed here would not place the United States at the top of the incarceration lists. If lists were compiled based on annual admissions to prison per capita, several European countries would outpace the United States. But American prison stays are much longer, so the total incarceration rate is higher."

Counting all inmates (not just those in adult prisons and jails) brings the number at the beginning of 2008 to 2.42 million inmates. This is by adding in inmates in U.S. territories, military facilities, U.S. Immigration and Customs Enforcement (ICE) owned and contracted facilities, jails in Indian country, and juvenile facilities. See chart below on the left:

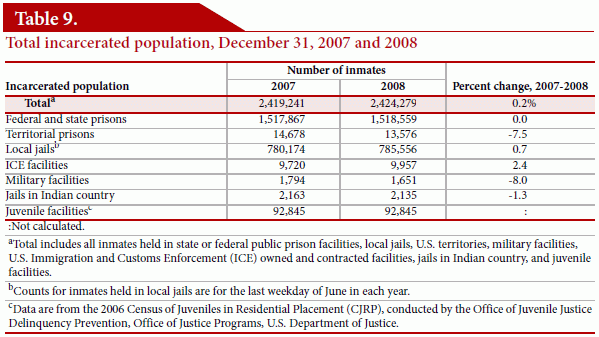

U.S. incarceration rate peaked in 2008. Prisoners per 100,000 population.

Total United States incarceration by year

US correctional population (prison, jail, probation, parole).

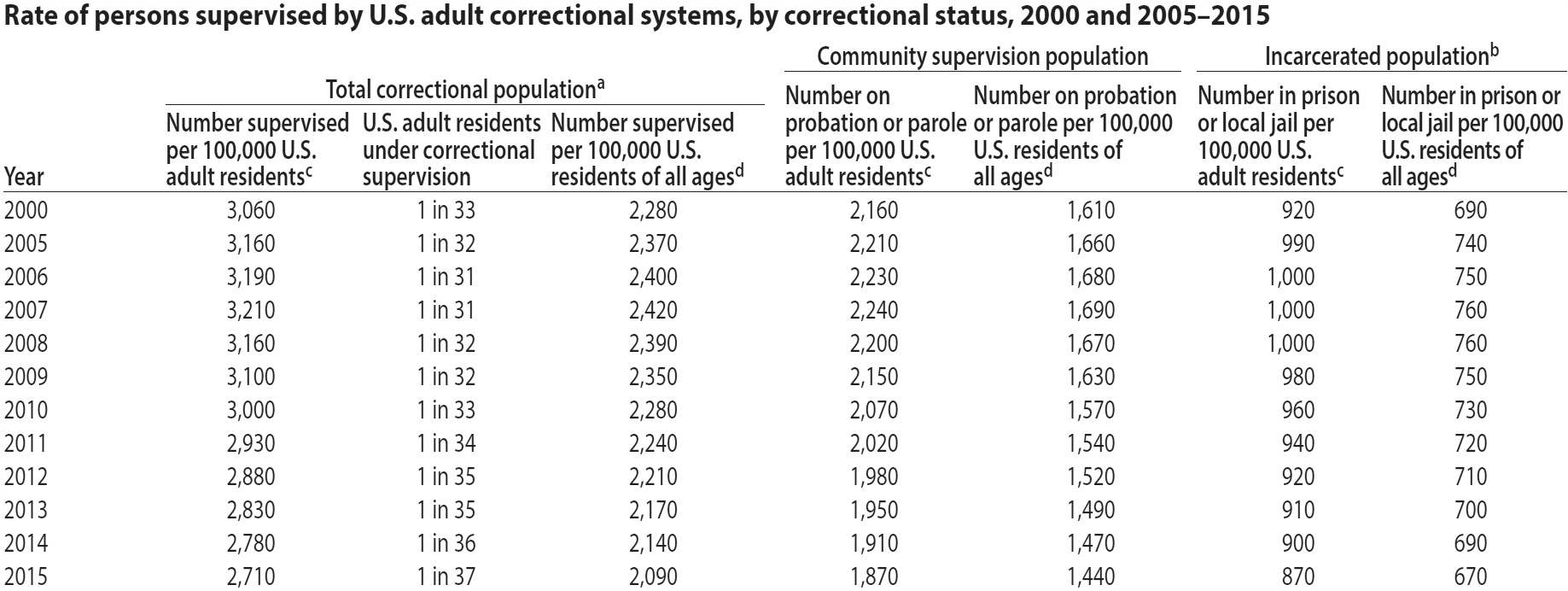
US incarceration and correctional population rates over time. The incarceration rate peaked in 2008.

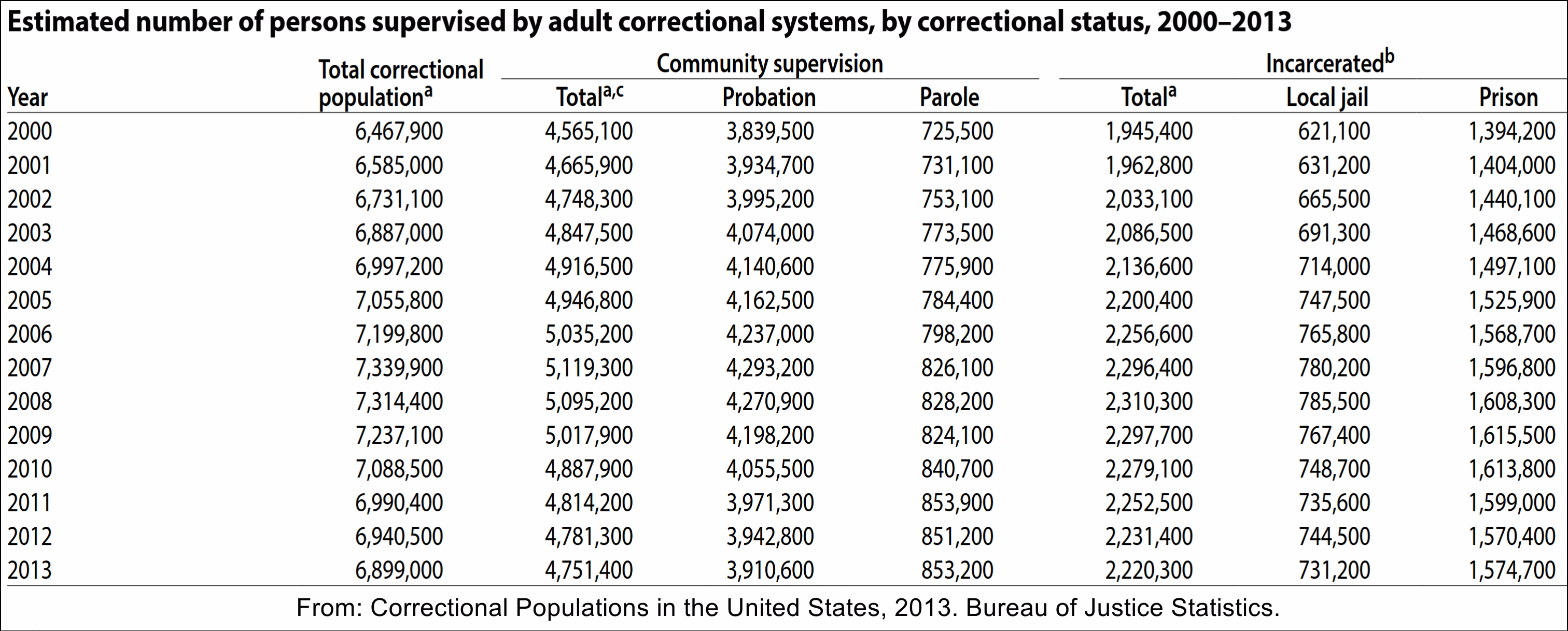
Total US incarceration peaked in 2008. Total correctional population peaked in 2007.

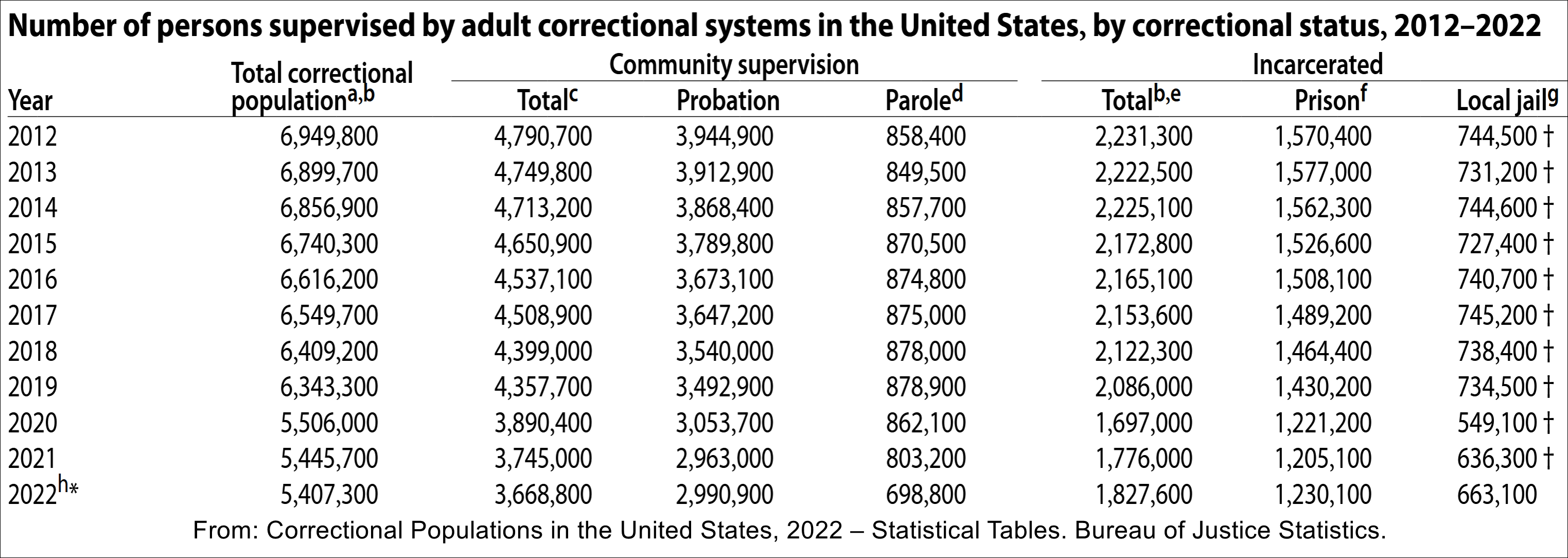
Number of persons supervised by adult correctional systems in the United States, by correctional status. Bureau of Justice Statistics.

== More comparisons ==
In addition, the United States has significant racial disparities in rates of incarceration. According to Michelle Alexander in a 2010 book, the United States "imprisons a larger percentage of its black population than South Africa did at the height of apartheid". The black imprisonment rate of South Africa could not have come close to today's American rate simply due to limited room. Notably, there's something of an international theme in countries comparing themselves to apartheid South Africa. There were instances where Australian journalists were drawing the same contrast relative to rates of imprisonment in their country. In the Huffington Post piece "Mass Incarceration's Failure", attorney Antonio Moore states "The incarceration rate for young black men ages 20 to 39, is nearly 10,000 per 100,000. To give context, during the racial discrimination of apartheid in South Africa, the prison rate for black male South Africans, rose to 851 per 100,000."

A major contributor to the high incarceration rates is the length of the prison sentences in the United States. One of the criticisms of the United States system is that it has much longer sentences than any other part of the world. The typical mandatory sentence for a first-time drug offense in federal court is five or ten years, compared to other developed countries around the world where a first time offense would warrant at most 6 months in jail. Mandatory sentencing prohibits judges from using their discretion and forces them to place longer sentences on nonviolent offenses than they normally would do.

Even though there are other countries that have a higher rate of committing inmates to prison annually, the fact that the United States keeps their prisoners longer causes the total incarceration rate to become higher. To give an example, the average burglary sentence in the United States is 16 months, compared to 5 months in Canada and 7 months in England.

The US incarceration rate peaked in 2008 when about 1,000 in 100,000 U.S. adults were behind bars. That's 760 inmates per 100,000 U.S. residents of all ages. This incarceration rate was similar to the average incarceration levels in the Soviet Union during the existence of the infamous Gulag system, when the Soviet Union's population reached 168 million, and 1.2 to 1.5 million people were in the Gulag prison camps and colonies (i.e. about 714 to 892 imprisoned per 100,000 USSR residents, according to numbers from Anne Applebaum and Steven Rosefielde). Some of the latter Soviet Union's yearly incarceration rates from 1934 to 1953, however, likely were the world's historically highest for a modern age country. In The New Yorker article The Caging of America (2012), Adam Gopnik writes: "Over all, there are now more people under 'correctional supervision' in America—more than six million—than were in the Gulag under Stalin at its height."

== Comparison to OECD countries ==
OECD incarceration rate by country. Data is from World Prison Brief.

All but four US states (the exceptions are Rhode Island, Vermont, Massachusetts, and Minnesota) have a higher incarceration rate than Turkey, the nation with the second highest incarceration rate among OECD countries. See: List of U.S. states by incarceration and correctional supervision rate.

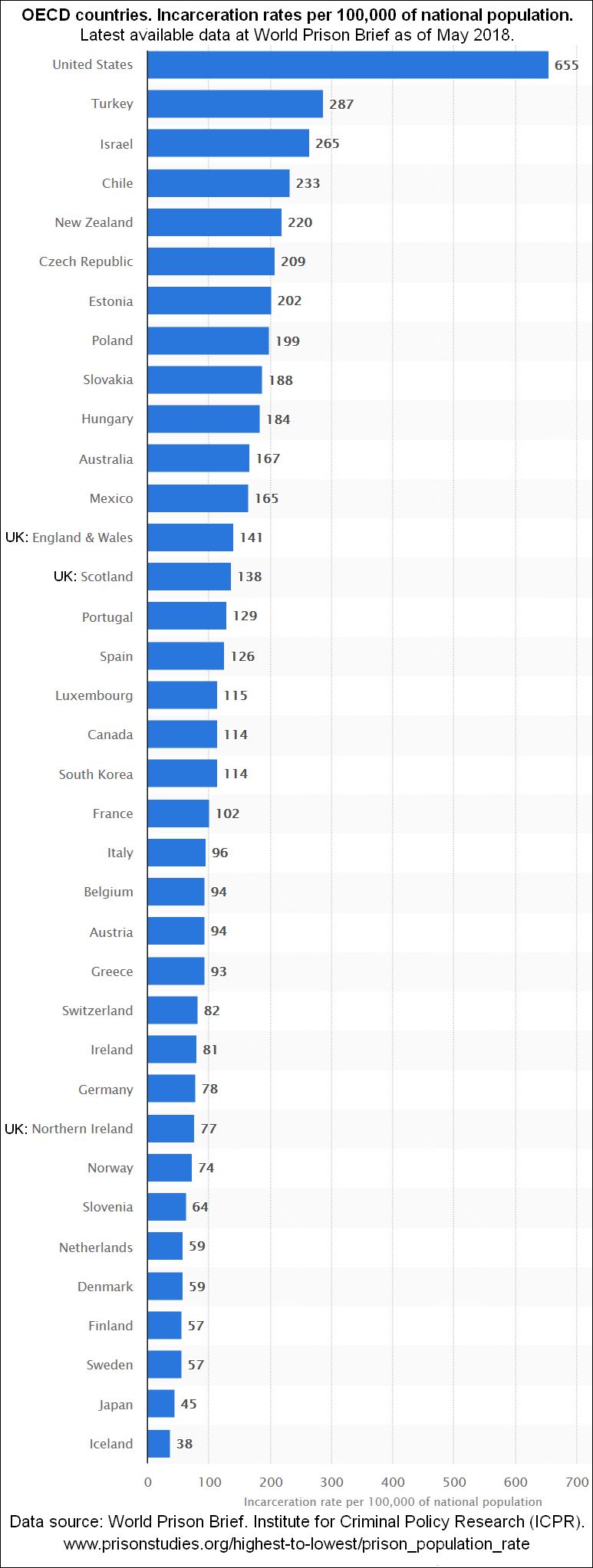

== See also ==
- List of U.S. states by incarceration rate
- Incarceration in the United States
- Youth incarceration in the United States
- War on drugs
