= World Prison Brief =

Online database providing free access to information on prison systems

- Owners: Institute for Crime & Justice Policy Research at Birkbeck, University of London
- Website: PrisonStudies.org

The World Prison Brief at PrisonStudies.org is an online database providing free access to information on prison systems around the world. It is now hosted by the Institute For Crime & Justice Policy Research (ICPR), Birkbeck College, University of London.

It was previously hosted by the International Centre for Prison Studies (ICPS). It was a research centre at the University of Essex. It was launched at the House of Lords on 4 April 2011. Between 1997 and 2010 ICPS was based in King's College London and was launched formally by Home Secretary Jack Straw in October 1997. In July 2010 the International Centre for Prison Studies incorporated and registered as a charity with the Charities Commission of England and Wales. From the outset the Centre was independent of governmental and intergovernmental agencies, although it would work closely with them.

The Centre is self-funded and a number of charitable trusts gave grants which allowed the Centre to start work. The centre seeks to assist governments and other agencies to develop appropriate policies on prisons and the use of imprisonment. It carries out its work on a project or consultancy basis for international agencies, governmental and non-governmental organisations.

It aims to make the results of its academic research and projects widely available to groups and individuals, both nationally and internationally, who might not normally use such work. These include policy makers, practitioners and administrators, the media and the general public.

In November 2014 the International Centre for Prison Studies merged with the Institute for Crime & Justice Policy Research at Birkbeck, University of London.

== People ==
The founding director is Andrew Coyle. The current director is Dr Jessica Jacobson. Baroness Stern is a senior research fellow at the centre.

== See also ==
- Incarceration
- List of countries by incarceration rate
