= Andrew Coyle =

British professor of prison studies

Andrew Coyle CMG is emeritus Professor of Prison Studies at the University of London.

== Life ==
Between 1997 and 2005, Coyle was founding director of the International Centre for Prison Studies at the School of Law, King's College London. In 2003, he was appointed Professor of Prison Studies at the same School of Law. He was a visiting professor at the University of Essex from 2011 to 2014.

He has a PhD from the School of Law at the University of Edinburgh and was appointed a Fellow of King's College London in 2004.

From 1973 to 1997, Coyle was a prison governor and successively governed Greenock, Peterhead, Shotts, and Brixton prisons. HM Chief Inspector of Prisons credited him with achieving "a remarkable transformation' at Brixton.

He was a member of the Judicial Appointments Board for Scotland from 2009 until 2014 and of the UK Administrative Justice and Tribunals Council from 2009 until 2013. From 2005 until 2010, he sat as a member of the inquiry into the murder of Billy Wright at Maze Prison, which was set up following the Northern Ireland Peace Agreement. From 2012 to 2013, at the request of the Scottish Government, Coyle carried out a review of proposed arrangements for the independent monitoring of prisons in Scotland. In 2015, he assisted the Inspector of Prisons for Ireland in reviewing the culture and organisation of the Irish Prison Service. He has been a specialist adviser to several UK parliamentary committees, most recently to the Justice Select Committee in its review of the government's proposals for prison reform in England and Wales.

Coyle has been an adviser on prison and criminal justice matters to the Office of the UN High Commissioner on Human Rights, the UN Office on Drugs and Crime, the UN Latin American Institute for the Prevention of Crime, and the Council of Europe, including its Committee for the Prevention of Torture (CPT). He was an expert member of the CPT's first two inspection visits to places of detention in the Russian Federation, in 1998 and 1999.

He was a member of the UK Foreign Secretary's Advisory Committee against Torture from 2003 to 2010 and negotiated with the Israeli government and the Palestinian Authority for the oversight of certain Palestinian prisoners between 2002 and 2006.

Andrew Coyle is president of the Howard League Scotland, vice president of the Prison Visitors Association, and patron of Unlock and of Prisoners Abroad.

He was appointed a Companion of the Order of St Michael and St George in the New Year's Honours 2003 for his contribution to international penal reform.
