= Susan Wicklund =

American physician (born 1954)

Susan Wicklund (born 1954) is an American physician. Until her retirement, Wicklund was the sole provider of abortions in some areas of the midwestern United States and was a prominent target of violence and harassment from opponents of abortion rights.

== Early life and education ==
Wicklund grew up in rural Wisconsin. After graduating high school, she worked low-wage part-time jobs and earned community college credits while receiving welfare and food stamps. When she became pregnant, she had an abortion in 1976, three years after the procedure became legal: Wicklund says that the poor treatment she received inspired her to make sure that other women would have better and more respectful reproductive health care. She trained as a midwife, having becoming interested in midwifery while pregnant with her daughter Sonja whose birth was supervised by a midwife. An acquaintance who learned of Wicklund's desire to improve women's reproductive health care recommended that she become a physician. Finishing college, Wicklund went on to medical school, and as part of her training, she learned to perform abortions.

== Practice ==
In 1988, Wicklund completed her training and began practicing medicine at the hospital in Grantsburg, Wisconsin, near where she had grown up. Hospital regulations that did not allow doctors to perform elective abortions left Wicklund frustrated at her inability to care for patients seeking them. By her account, she would receive a patient after hours and insert laminaria into the patient's cervix, inducing a miscarriage that would necessitate a therapeutic dilation and curettage in the hospital emergency room the next day.

At the April 1989 March for Women's Lives in Washington, D.C., which she attended with her mother and daughter, Wicklund "felt a personal call to action" and soon sought out clinics where she could work as an abortion provider. That summer, she began traveling a few days a week to Milwaukee and Appleton, Wisconsin. In October, she left her job at the Grantsburg hospital and began working full-time as an itinerant abortion provider, traveling two hundred miles or more a day to work, adding clinics in St. Paul, Duluth, and Fargo to the Wisconsin locations. The frequent travel and long working hours led Wicklund and her husband to divorce.

In February 1993, Wicklund opened her own clinic, the Mountain Country Women's Clinic in Bozeman, Montana, moving into the space formerly used by a retiring 72-year-old doctor who had heard about her work and the pressure she was under and offered to sell her his clinic. When she had to leave Montana in order to take care of her dying mother in Wisconsin, she hoped to sell the practice to another abortion provider or arrange with other doctors to keep it running on a temporary basis, but in January 1998, she closed it and donated the equipment to nonprofit health centers. Wicklund later re-opened Mountain Country Women's Clinic, after some delay, in Livingston, Montana in February 2009, sixteen years to the day after the original Mountain Country Women's Clinic had opened. In the meantime, she had been fired from the clinic in St. Paul after treating a patient who could not afford to pay.

Wicklund placed a high importance on counseling in her practice, and if she believed that a patient was not completely secure in her decision to end her pregnancy or that she was bowing to pressure from others, she asked her to think it over and return another time. Sometimes this strengthened the patient's confidence in her decision, while other times it led her to change her mind and decide to give birth. Such focus on speaking to the patients also enabled Wicklund to find out when young girls who came to her were being abused, and to have police catch the perpetrators.

Wicklund performed abortions only in the first trimester of pregnancy. Although she supports the legality of late-term abortions, she decided not to provide them after witnessing an abortion at 21 weeks as a medical student.

For a number of years, Wicklund was the sole abortion provider for women in North Dakota. No North Dakota doctors perform surgical abortions, so the clinic in Fargo, the state's only one, must fly physicians in. Besides patients from Minnesota, Montana, North Dakota, and Wisconsin, the states in which she worked, she also saw patients traveling from Wyoming, which has two abortion providers, and South Dakota, which has only one.

Wicklund retired in 2013 to look after her health and her family, closing the Mountain Country Women's Clinic in Livingston, Montana.

== Anti-abortion violence and harassment ==
Wicklund has often faced death threats, assaults, stalking, and harassment from abortion rights opponents, obliging her to adopt measures to protect herself: wearing disguises such as wigs and heavy makeup, carrying a loaded revolver, wearing a bulletproof vest, employing a security guard, owning a guard dog, taking roundabout routes home so that protesters would not know where she lived, and varying her routine so that they would not be able to predict where she would be. Wicklund describes the necessity of taking such measures in order to go to work to perform a legal procedure in the United States as "absolutely absurd." In addition to the threats and violence against Wicklund's person, her clinics, including the Mountain Country Women's Clinic and the Fargo Women's Health Organization, have also been the target of bombing, arson, acid attacks, and violent invasion.

In October 1991, protesters from the Lambs of Christ, shouting "Susan kills babies!" surrounded Wicklund's home and camped outside for weeks. Her daughter Sonja had to go to school in a police car. The protesters blockaded Wicklund's driveway with cement barrels to try to stop her from going to work; she sneaked through the woods to get a ride from a friend. Twice during that month, Wicklund's house was broken into; nothing was taken, but Wicklund said, "I think they just wanted to show me they could get in." She believes that she was tracked down when a protester wrote down her license plate number and found her home address in a public database; the incident, and other use of license plate numbers by anti-abortion protesters, led Rep. Jim Moran to introduce the Driver's Privacy Protection Act in 1992. It also prompted a permanent restraining order prohibiting several groups and individuals, including the Lambs of Christ, from following Wicklund. During the siege, protesters passed leaflets around Sonja's school that said "Sonja's mom kills babies"; a protester was found in the school library searching yearbooks for a picture of Sonja. One of the protesters was Shelley Shannon, who in 1993 shot Doctor George Tiller several times in the arms prior to Tiller's 2009 shooting murder by Scott Roeder.

Wicklund's dealings with these anti-abortion protesters were the subject of her appearance on 60 Minutes in February 1992. In 1993, she would also receive 62 letters over two months, threatening her with torture and death, from an abortion rights opponent who was subsequently convicted of felony intimidation and sentenced to ten years in federal prison. The Guardian named Wicklund one of its top 100 women in March 2011, in recognition of her work in the face of violence.

== Book ==
Wicklund's book, This Common Secret: My Journey as an Abortion Doctor, was co-written with Alan Kesselheim and published by PublicAffairs in 2007; it is a memoir that includes her own life and some of her patients' stories. The title refers to the procedure of abortion, which is "common" in that almost 40% of American women have an abortion at some point in their lives— making it more prevalent than wisdom tooth removal or tonsillectomy—and a "secret" in that individual women are often ashamed of or reluctant to speak about their abortions. Wicklund said that she hoped the book would foster discussion of abortion on a personal level.

Among the patients whose stories are included are a regular anti-abortion protester at the clinic who turned to Wicklund for help when she had an unwanted pregnancy; a rape victim who found out only after terminating her pregnancy that she had conceived by her husband before the rape; and a woman who lost her job because the state mandated a 24-hour waiting period before an abortion, obliging the patient to miss several days of work for multiple visits. Wicklund also describes the experience of revealing to her maternal grandmother that she was an abortion provider, a disclosure that she expected would receive her grandmother's disapproval. Instead, her grandmother told Wicklund that she was proud of her work, saying that when she was sixteen, her best friend got pregnant and bled to death from an unsafe self-induced abortion.
