= Executive of the 3rd Northern Ireland Assembly =

Northern Ireland Executive (2007–2011)

- 2nd Executive of Northern Ireland
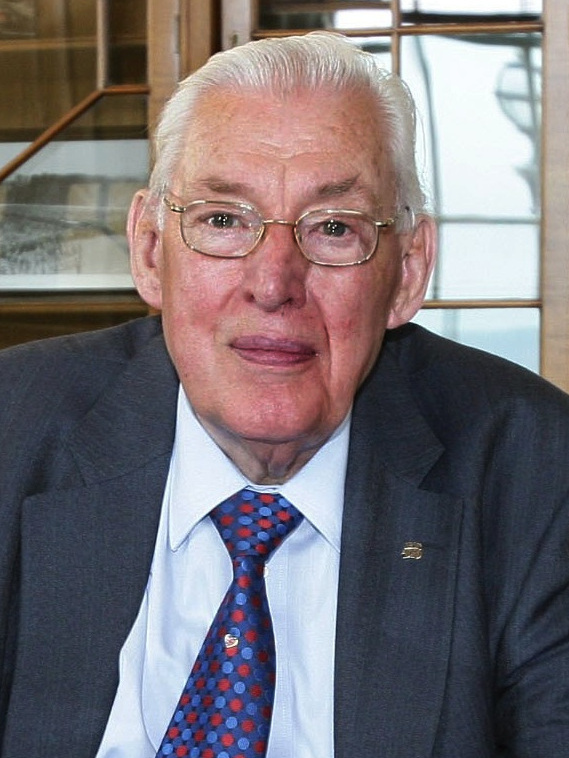
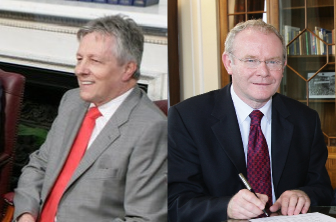
- Date formed: 8 May 2007
- Date dissolved: 16 May 2011

People and organisations
- Head of state: Elizabeth II
- Head of government: Ian Paisley (2007–08); Peter Robinson (2008–Jan. 10; Feb. 2010–11); Arlene Foster (Jan.–Feb. 2010)
- Deputy head of government: Martin McGuinness
- No. of ministers: 10 (2007–10); 11 (2010–11)
- Member party: DUP; Sinn Féin; UUP; SDLP; Alliance (2010–11)
- Status in legislature: Power–Sharing Coalition

History
- Election: 2007 assembly election
- Legislature term: 3rd Assembly
- Predecessor: Executive of the 2nd Assembly (Direct rule)
- Successor: Executive of the 4th Assembly

The Second Executive (8 May 2007 – 16 May 2011) is as under the terms of the Northern Ireland Act 1998 a power sharing coalition.

Devolution was restored to Northern Ireland on 8 May 2007 following the St Andrews Agreement, the March election saw the Democratic Unionist Party and Sinn Féin emerge as the largest parties in the Assembly.

== 2nd Executive of Northern Ireland ==
Office	Name	Term	Party
First Minister	Ian Paisley	2007–08	DUP
Deputy First Minister	Martin McGuinness	2007–11	Sinn Féin
Minister of Agriculture and Rural Development	Michelle Gildernew	2007–11	Sinn Féin
Minister of Culture, Arts and Leisure	Edwin Poots	2007–08	DUP
Minister of Education	Caitríona Ruane	2007–11	Sinn Féin
Minister for Employment and Learning	Sir Reg Empey	2007–10	UUP
Minister of Enterprise, Trade and Investment	Nigel Dodds	2007–08	DUP
Minister of the Environment	Arlene Foster	2007–08	DUP
Minister of Finance and Personnel	Peter Robinson	2007–08	DUP
Minister of Health, Social Services and Public Safety	Michael McGimpsey	2007–11	UUP
Minister for Regional Development	Conor Murphy	2007–11	Sinn Féin
Minister for Social Development	Margaret Ritchie	2007–11	SDLP
=== Changes 5 June 2008 ===
Office	Name	Term	Party
First Minister	Peter Robinson	2008–10	DUP
Minister of Finance and Personnel	Vacant	2008	
=== Changes 9 June 2008 ===
Office	Name	Term	Party
Minister of Culture, Arts and Leisure	Gregory Campbell	2008–09	DUP
Minister of Enterprise, Trade and Investment	Arlene Foster	2008–11	DUP
Minister of the Environment	Sammy Wilson	2008–09	DUP
Minister of Finance and Personnel	Nigel Dodds	2008–09	DUP
=== Changes 1 July 2009 ===
Office	Name	Term	Party
Minister of Culture, Arts and Leisure	Nelson McCausland	2009–11	DUP
Minister of the Environment	Edwin Poots	2009–11	DUP
Minister of Finance and Personnel	Sammy Wilson	2009–11	DUP
=== Changes 11 January 2010 ===
Office	Name	Term	Party
First Minister of Northern Ireland	Arlene Foster (acting)	2010	DUP
=== Changes 3 February 2010 ===
Office	Name	Term	Party
First Minister of Northern Ireland	Peter Robinson	2010–11	DUP
=== Changes 12 April 2010 ===
Office	Name	Term	Party
Minister of Justice	David Ford	2010–11	Alliance
=== Changes 27 October 2010 ===
Office	Name	Term	Party
Minister for Employment and Learning	Danny Kennedy	2010–11	UUP

=== Junior Ministers ===
Junior Minister in the Office of the First Minister and Deputy First Minister	Ian Paisley Jr	2007–08	DUP
Junior Minister in the Office of the First Minister and Deputy First Minister	Jeffrey Donaldson	2008–09	DUP
Junior Minister in the Office of the First Minister and Deputy First Minister	Robin Newton	2009–11	DUP
Junior Minister in the Office of the First Minister and Deputy First Minister	Gerry Kelly	2007–11	Sinn Féin

== See also ==
- List of Northern Ireland Executives
- Members of the Northern Ireland Assembly elected in 2007
