= Executive of the 2nd Northern Ireland Assembly =

Absent Northern Ireland Executive (2002–2007)

Direct Rule (2002-2007) Executive of the 2nd Northern Ireland Assembly
- Date formed: 14 October 2002
- Date dissolved: 8 May 2007 (under the St Andrews Agreement)

People and organisations
- Head of state: Elizabeth II
- Head of government: Secretary of State; John Reid (Oct 2002); Paul Murphy (Oct 2002 - May 2005); Peter Hain (May 2005 - May 2007)
- Deputy head of government: None
- No. of ministers: None
- Member party: None
- Status in legislature: Direct Rule

History
- Election: 2003 assembly election
- Legislature term: 2nd Assembly (never convened)
- Predecessor: 1st Executive of Northern Ireland
- Successor: 3rd Executive of Northern Ireland

Following the suspension of the Northern Ireland Assembly in 2002 a new election was called in November 2003 in hope of restoring devolution, the election saw the Democratic Unionist Party (DUP) and Sinn Féin emerge as the largest parties in the Assembly. The DUP refused to go into government with Sinn Féin meaning that direct rule would stay in place for another 5 years.

Northern Ireland had 3 Secretaries of States during the period of direct rule:

- John Reid in October 2002,
- Paul Murphy between October 2002 and May 2005,
- Peter Hain between May 2005 and May 2007.

The assembly was officially dissolved in 2007 following the St Andrews Agreement.

== Executive committee ==
Office	Name	Term
First Minister	Vacant	2002–07
deputy First Minister	Vacant	2002–07
Minister of Agriculture and Rural Development	Vacant	2002–07
Minister of Culture, Arts and Leisure	Vacant	2002–07
Minister of Education	Vacant	2002–07
Minister for Employment and Learning	Vacant	2002–07
Minister of Enterprise, Trade and Investment	Vacant	2002–07
Minister of the Environment	Vacant	2002–07
Minister of Finance and Personnel	Vacant	2002–07
Minister of Health, Social Services and Public Safety	Vacant	2002–07
Minister for Regional Development	Vacant	2002–07
Minister for Social Development	Vacant	2002–07

== See also ==
- List of Northern Ireland Executives
- Members of the Northern Ireland Assembly elected in 2003
