= Executive of the 1st Northern Ireland Assembly =

Northern Ireland Executive (1998–2002)

- 1st Executive of Northern Ireland
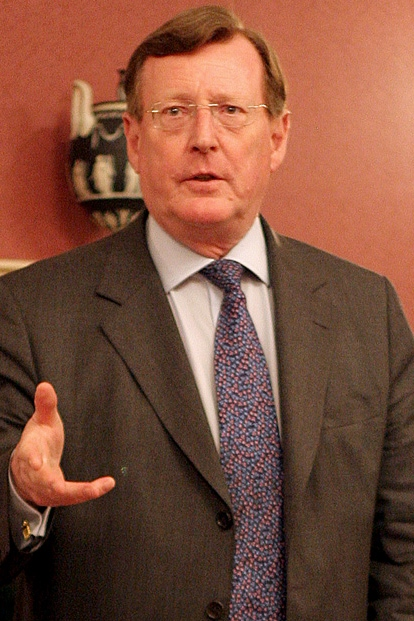
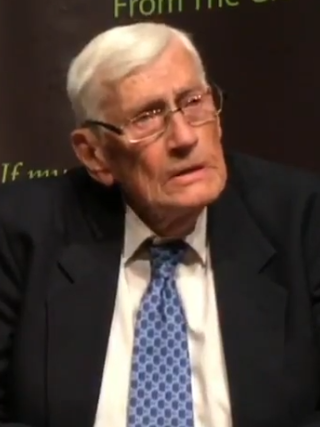
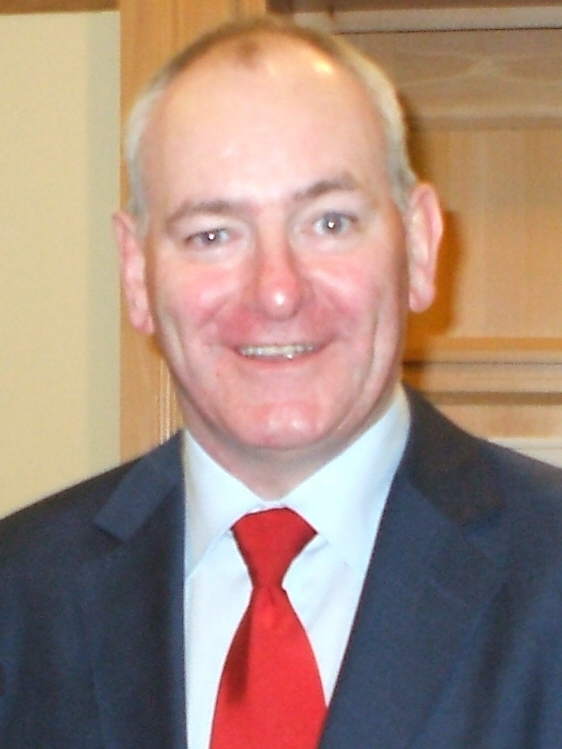
- Date formed: 1 July 1998
- Date dissolved: 14 October 2002

People and organisations
- Head of state: Elizabeth II
- Head of government: David Trimble (1998–July 01; Nov. 01–02); Reg Empey (July 01–Nov. 01)
- Deputy head of government: Seamus Mallon (1998–01); Mark Durkan (2001–02)
- No. of ministers: 10
- Member party: UUP; SDLP; DUP; Sinn Féin
- Status in legislature: Power–Sharing Coalition

History
- Election: 1998 assembly election
- Legislature term: 1st Assembly
- Predecessor: 1974 Executive of Northern Ireland; Direct rule (1974–98)
- Successor: Executive of the 2nd Assembly (Direct rule)

The Executive of the 1st Northern Ireland Assembly (1 July 1998 – 14 October 2002) was, under the terms of the Northern Ireland Act 1998, a power-sharing coalition.

Following the first election to the new Northern Ireland Assembly the Ulster Unionist Party, the Social Democratic and Labour Party and Sinn Féin all took up their ministerial posts and formed an executive, the Democratic Unionist Party refused to attend meetings of the executive committee in protest at Sinn Féin's participation.

Full power was devolved to the Executive on 2 December 1999. This power was revoked by the Secretary of State on four occasions. The first was for a period of 3 months from 11 February 2000 – 30 May 2000 because of no arms decommissioning. The next two times were for periods of 24 hours on 10 August 2001 to help deal with arms negotiations and 21 September 2001 following the Holy Cross dispute. The final suspension came on 14 October 2002 after the Stormontgate controversy surrounding an alleged Provisional Irish Republican Army spy ring based in Stormont.

== 1st Executive of Northern Ireland ==
Office	Name	Term	Party
First Minister	David Trimble	1998–01	UUP
Deputy First Minister	Seamus Mallon	1998–01	SDLP
=== Changes 2 December 1999 ===
Office	Name	Term	Party
Minister of Agriculture and Rural Development	Bríd Rodgers	1999–00	SDLP
Minister of Culture, Arts and Leisure	Michael McGimpsey	1999–00	UUP
Minister of Education	Martin McGuinness	1999–00	Sinn Féin
Minister for Employment and Learning	Sean Farren	1999–00	SDLP
Minister of Enterprise, Trade and Investment	Reg Empey	1999–00	UUP
Minister of the Environment	Sam Foster	1999–00	UUP
Minister of Finance and Personnel	Mark Durkan	1999–00	SDLP
Minister of Health, Social Services and Public Safety	Bairbre de Brún	1999–00	Sinn Féin
Minister for Regional Development	Peter Robinson	1999–00	DUP
Minister for Social Development	Nigel Dodds	1999–00	DUP
=== Changes 11 February 2000 ===
Office	Name	Term	Party
Minister of Agriculture and Rural Development	Office suspended	2000	
Minister of Culture, Arts and Leisure	Office suspended	2000	
Minister of Education	Office suspended	2000	
Minister for Employment and Learning	Office suspended	2000	
Minister of Enterprise, Trade and Investment	Office suspended	2000	
Minister of the Environment	Office suspended	2000	
Minister of Finance and Personnel	Office suspended	2000	
Minister of Health, Social Services and Public Safety	Office suspended	2000	
Minister for Regional Development	Office suspended	2000	
Minister for Social Development	Office suspended	2000	
=== Changes 30 May 2000 ===
Office	Name	Term	Party
Minister of Agriculture and Rural Development	Bríd Rodgers	2000–02	SDLP
Minister of Culture, Arts and Leisure	Michael McGimpsey	2000–02	UUP
Minister of Education	Martin McGuinness	2000–02	Sinn Féin
Minister for Employment and Learning	Sean Farren	2000–01	SDLP
Minister of Enterprise, Trade and Investment	Reg Empey	2000–02	UUP
Minister of the Environment	Sam Foster	2000–02	UUP
Minister of Finance and Personnel	Mark Durkan	2000–01	SDLP
Minister of Health, Social Services and Public Safety	Bairbre de Brún	2000–02	Sinn Féin
Minister for Regional Development	Peter Robinson	2000–01	DUP
Minister for Social Development	Nigel Dodds	2000	DUP
=== Changes 1 July 2001 ===
Office	Name	Term	Party
First Minister	Reg Empey (acting)	2001	UUP
=== Changes 27 July 2001 ===
Office	Name	Term	Party
Minister for Regional Development	Gregory Campbell	2001	DUP
Minister for Social Development	Maurice Morrow	2000–01	DUP
=== Changes 24 October 2001 ===
Office	Name	Term	Party
Minister for Regional Development	Peter Robinson	2001–02	DUP
Minister for Social Development	Nigel Dodds	2001–02	DUP
=== Changes 6 November 2001 ===
Office	Name	Term	Party
First Minister	David Trimble	2001–02	UUP
deputy First Minister	Mark Durkan	2001–02	SDLP
=== Changes 14 December 2001 ===
Office	Name	Term	Party
Minister for Employment and Learning	Carmel Hanna	2001–02	SDLP
Minister of Finance and Personnel	Sean Farren	2001–02	SDLP
=== Changes 20 February 2002 ===
Office	Name	Term	Party
Minister of the Environment	Dermot Nesbitt	2002	UUP

== See also ==
- List of Northern Ireland Executives
- Members of the Northern Ireland Assembly elected in 2007
