= Executive of the 6th Northern Ireland Assembly =

Northern Ireland Executive (2020–2022)

- 5th Executive of Northern Ireland
- January 2020 – February 2022
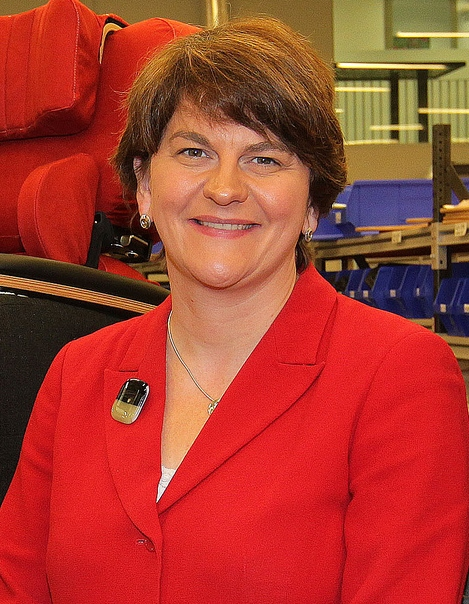
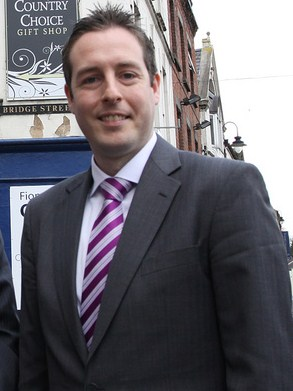
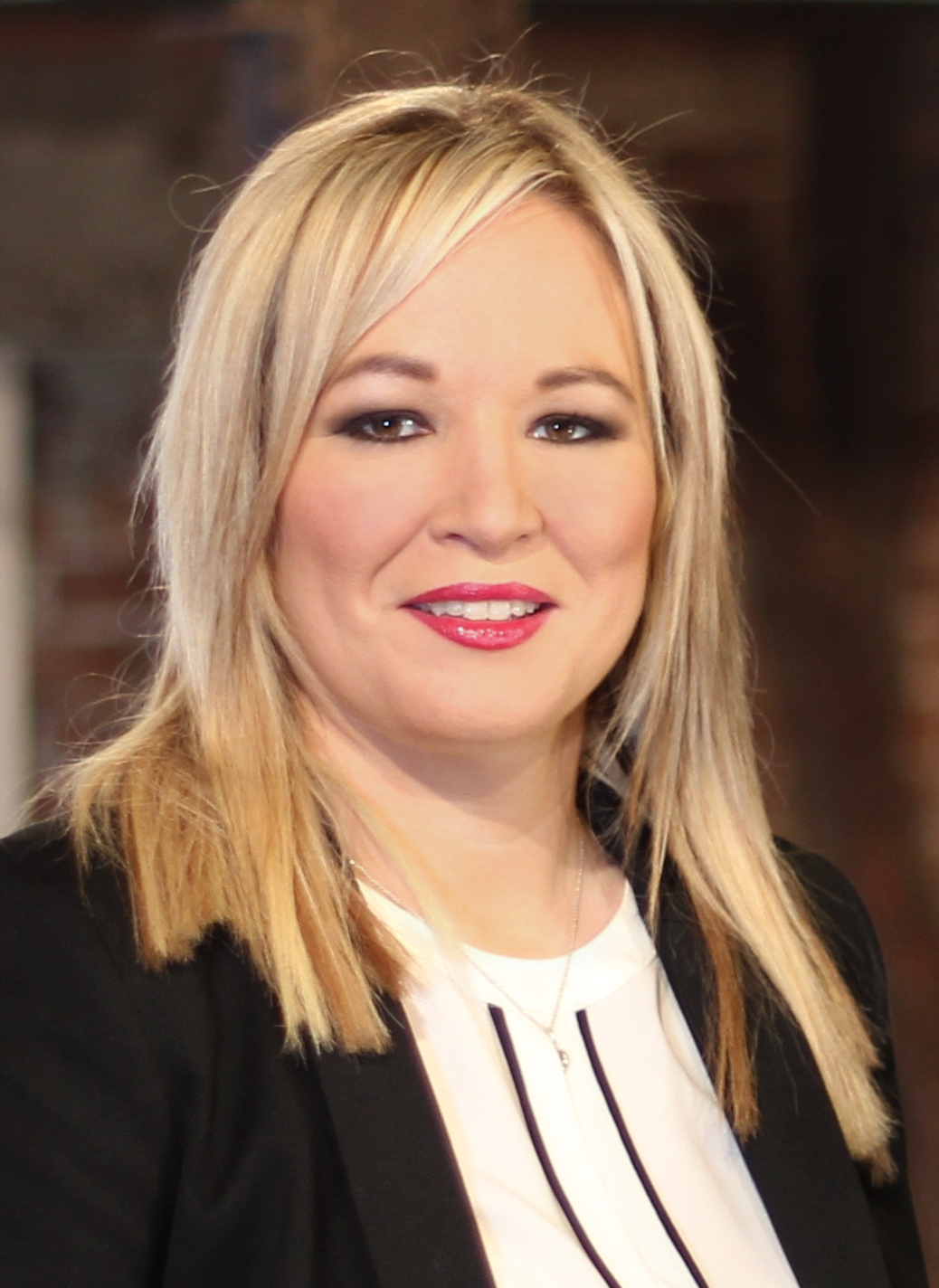
- First Ministers Foster and Givan; deputy First Minister O'Neill
- Date formed: 11 January 2020
- Date dissolved: 4 February 2022

People and organisations
- Head of state: Elizabeth II
- Co-heads of government: Arlene Foster; Paul Givan (First Ministers); Michelle O'Neill (deputy First Minister)
- No. of ministers: 10 (+ 2 junior ministers)
- Member party: DUP; Sinn Féin; SDLP; UUP; Alliance
- Status in legislature: Power–sharing coalition

History
- Election: 2017 assembly election
- Legislature term: 6th Assembly
- Predecessor: Executive of the 5th Assembly
- Successor: Executive of the 7th Assembly

The Executive of the 6th Northern Ireland Assembly was appointed on 11 January 2020, after the confirmation of Arlene Foster and Michelle O'Neill as First and deputy First Minister.

Following the 2 March 2017 elections to the sixth Northern Ireland Assembly, the Democratic Unionist Party (DUP) and Sinn Féin remained the two largest parties in the Assembly. Parties in Northern Ireland that were eligible to join the Northern Ireland Executive were given a deadline of 27 March 2017 to form an Executive. The deadline passed and Secretary of State for Northern Ireland James Brokenshire passed an emergency law at Westminster to allow more time for talks to take place. Brokenshire threatened direct rule if no agreement was reached by early May 2017. This deadline was later extended to 29 June after Prime Minister, Theresa May's decision to call a snap general election for 8 June 2017.

On 29 June 2017, the DUP and Sinn Féin had both announced that they had not come to an agreement to form the next Northern Ireland Executive. Brokenshire extended the deadline until 3 July 2017 for further talks to continue. Abortive talks continued intermittently through 2017, 2018 and 2019 but were overshadowed by the UK Brexit Withdrawal Agreement and the DUP role in supporting the minority British Government. Intensive talks resumed in December 2019 following the 2019 UK General Election with a new deadline of 13 January 2020 for fresh assembly elections set by Secretary of State Julian Smith. An agreement was published by the two governments on 9 January 2020 and it was accepted by the leading parties.

The Ulster Unionist Party (UUP), Social Democratic and Labour Party (SDLP) and Alliance Party of Northern Ireland returned to the Executive, having been absent since 2016; Alliance's Naomi Long obtained the cross-community vote to become Minister for Justice.

The 2024 Northern Ireland Executive Formation will restore power-sharing at Stormont.

== 5th Executive of Northern Ireland ==
Northern Ireland Executive
| Portfolio | Minister | Party | Term |
|---|---|---|---|
Executive Ministers
| First Minister | Arlene Foster | DUP | 2020–2021 |
| Deputy First Minister | Michelle O'Neill | Sinn Féin | 2020–2021 |
| Agriculture, Environment and Rural Affairs | Edwin Poots | DUP | 2020–2022 |
| Communities | Deirdre Hargey | Sinn Féin | 2020–2022 |
| Economy | Diane Dodds | DUP | 2020–2021 |
| Education | Peter Weir | DUP | 2020–2021 |
| Finance | Conor Murphy | Sinn Féin | 2020–2022 |
| Health | Robin Swann | UUP | 2020–2022 |
| Infrastructure | Nichola Mallon | SDLP | 2020–2022 |
| Justice | Naomi Long | Alliance | 2020–2022 |
Also attending Executive meetings
| Junior Minister (assisting the First Minister) | Gordon Lyons | DUP | 2020–2021 |
| Junior Minister (assisting the deputy First Minister) | Declan Kearney | Sinn Féin | 2020–2022 |
=== Changes 14 June 2021 ===
| Office | Name | Party | Term |
| Economy | Paul Frew | DUP | 2021 |
| Education | Michelle McIlveen | DUP | 2021–2022 |
=== Changes 17 June 2021 ===
| Office | Name | Party | Term |
| First Minister | Paul Givan | DUP | 2021–2022 |
| Deputy First Minister | Michelle O'Neill | Sinn Féin | 2021–2022 |
| Junior Minister (assisting the First Minister) | Gary Middleton | DUP | 2021–2022 |
=== Changes 6 July 2021 ===
| Office | Name | Party | Term |
| Economy | Gordon Lyons | DUP | 2021–2022 |
=== Changes 3 February 2022 ===
| Office | Name | Party | Term |
| First Minister | Vacant | | 2022 |
| Deputy First Minister | Vacant | | 2022 |
=== Changes 16 May 2022 ===
| Office | Name | Party | Term |
| Infrastructure | John O'Dowd | Sinn Féin | 2022 |

== See also ==
- List of Northern Ireland Executives
- Members of the Northern Ireland Assembly elected in 2017
