= Executive of the 4th Northern Ireland Assembly =

Northern Ireland Executive (2011–2016)

- 3rd Executive of Northern Ireland
- Incumbent
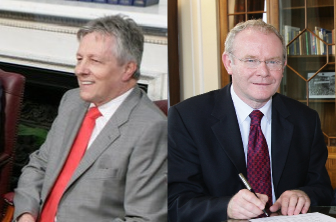
- Date formed: 16 May 2011
- Date dissolved: 6 May 2016

People and organisations
- Head of state: Elizabeth II
- Head of government: Peter Robinson (2011–15, Oct. 2015–Jan.2016); Arlene Foster (Sep.–Oct. 2015, Jan. 2016–)
- Deputy head of government: Martin McGuinness (May–Sep. 2011; Oct. 2011–); John O'Dowd (Sep.–Oct. 2011)
- No. of ministers: 11
- Member party: DUP; Sinn Féin; UUP (2011–15); SDLP; Alliance
- Status in legislature: Power–Sharing Coalition

History
- Election: 2011 assembly election
- Legislature term: 4th Assembly
- Predecessor: Executive of the 3rd Assembly
- Successor: Executive of the 5th Assembly

The Third Executive (16 May 2011 – 6 May 2016) was, under the terms of the Northern Ireland Act 1998, a power-sharing coalition.

Following the 5 May 2011 elections to the fourth Northern Ireland Assembly the Democratic Unionist Party and Sinn Féin remained the two largest parties in the Assembly. The Assembly finished selecting an executive on Monday 16 May 2011.

== 3rd Executive of Northern Ireland ==
Office	Name	Term	Party
First Minister	Peter Robinson	2011–15	DUP
Deputy First Minister	Martin McGuinness	2011–	Sinn Féin
Minister of Agriculture and Rural Development	Michelle O'Neill	2011–	Sinn Féin
Minister of Culture, Arts and Leisure	Carál Ní Chuilín	2011–	Sinn Féin
Minister of Education	John O'Dowd	2011–	Sinn Féin
Minister for Employment and Learning	Stephen Farry	2011–	Alliance
Minister for Enterprise, Trade and Investment	Arlene Foster	2011–15	DUP
Minister of the Environment	Alex Attwood	2011–13	SDLP
Minister of Finance and Personnel	Sammy Wilson	2011–13	DUP
Minister of Health, Social Services and Public Safety	Edwin Poots	2011–14	DUP
Minister of Justice	David Ford	2011–	Alliance
Minister for Regional Development	Danny Kennedy	2011–15	UUP
Minister for Social Development	Nelson McCausland	2011–14	DUP
=== Changes 20 September 2011 ===
Office	Name	Term	Party
Deputy First Minister	John O'Dowd (acting)	2011	Sinn Féin
=== Changes 31 October 2011 ===
Office	Name	Term	Party
Deputy First Minister	Martin McGuinness	2011–	Sinn Féin
=== Changes 16 July 2013 ===
Office	Name	Term	Party
Minister of the Environment	Mark H. Durkan	2013–	SDLP
=== Changes 29 July 2013 ===
Office	Name	Term	Party
Minister of Finance and Personnel	Simon Hamilton	2013–15	DUP
=== Changes 23 September 2014 ===
Office	Name	Term	Party
Minister of Health, Social Services and Public Safety	Jim Wells	2014–15	DUP
Minister for Social Development	Mervyn Storey	2014–15	DUP
=== Changes 11 May 2015 ===
Office	Name	Term	Party
Minister of Health, Social Services and Public Safety	Simon Hamilton	2015	DUP
Minister for Enterprise, Trade and Investment	Jonathan Bell	2015	DUP
Minister for Finance and Personnel	Arlene Foster	2015–	DUP
=== Changes 1 September 2015 ===
Office	Name	Term	Party
Minister for Regional Development	Vacant	2015–15	
=== Changes 10 September 2015 ===
Office	Name	Term	Party
First Minister	Arlene Foster (acting)	2015–15	DUP
Minister for Enterprise, Trade and Investment	Vacant	2015–15	
Minister of Health, Social Services and Public Safety	Vacant	2015–15	
Minister for Social Development	Vacant	2015–15	
=== Changes 20 October 2015 ===
Office	Name	Term	Party
First Minister	Peter Robinson	2015–2016	DUP
Minister for Enterprise, Trade and Investment	Jonathan Bell	2015–	DUP
Minister of Health, Social Services and Public Safety	Simon Hamilton	2015–	DUP
Minister for Social Development	Mervyn Storey	2015–2016	DUP
Minister for Regional Development	Michelle McIlveen	2015–	DUP
=== Changes 11 January 2016 ===
Office	Name	Term	Party
First Minister	Arlene Foster	2016–	DUP
=== Changes 12 January 2016 ===
Office	Name	Term	Party
Minister for Finance	Mervyn Storey	2016–	DUP
Minister for Social Development	Lord Morrow	2016–	DUP

=== Junior Ministers ===
Junior Minister in the Office of the First Minister and Deputy First Minister	Jonathan Bell	2011–15	DUP
Junior Minister in the Office of the First Minister and Deputy First Minister	Michelle McIlveen	2015	DUP
Junior Minister in the Office of the First Minister and Deputy First Minister	Emma Pengelly	2015–	DUP
Junior Minister in the Office of the First Minister and Deputy First Minister	Martina Anderson	2011–12	Sinn Féin
Junior Minister in the Office of the First Minister and Deputy First Minister	Jennifer McCann	2012–	Sinn Féin

== Sources ==
- "New Executive ministers to be appointed on Monday", BBC News, 16 May 2011
- "Stormont Assembly votes in new team of Ministers", by Dan Keenan, The Irish Times, 17 May 2011 (retrieved 16 May 2011)

== See also ==
- List of Northern Ireland Executives
- Members of the Northern Ireland Assembly elected in 2011
