= List of government ministers in Northern Ireland =

This Wikipedia page is a list of government ministers in Northern Ireland.

== Government ministers ==
- First Minister and deputy First Minister
  - junior Ministers
- Minister of Agriculture, Environment and Rural Affairs
- Minister of Education
- Minister for Communities
- Minister for the Economy
- Minister of Finance
- Minister of Health
- Minister for Infrastructure
- Minister for Justice

== See also ==
- Northern Ireland Executive
