= List of heads of government of Northern Ireland =

Since 1921, there have been three different prime ministerial offices in Northern Ireland. The most recent devolved cabinet is the Northern Ireland Executive, established under the Good Friday Agreement. The Executive has been in operation, intermittently, since 1999; but had existed continuously since 2007, but after elections following a government collapsed on 16 January 2017, no Executive was formed until January 2020, when the parties came to an agreement and an Executive was subsequently established. The most recent structure, the Office of the First Minister and deputy First Minister, represents a diarchy. As such, there is no longer a singular executive office, but rather a dual office.

== Offices ==
Head	Cabinet	Date
Prime Minister	Government	7 June 1921 – 30 March 1972
Chief Executive	Executive (Sunningdale)	1 January 1974 – 28 May 1974
First Minister and deputy First Minister	Executive	Since 1 July 1998

== List of officeholders ==
No.	Portrait	Name (Birth–Death) Constituency	Term of office			Political party	Election	Government	Ref.
No.	Portrait	Name (Birth–Death) Constituency	Took office	Left office	Time in office	Political party	Election	Government	Ref.
1		Sir James Craig (Note: Created the Viscount Craigavon in 1927.) (1871–1940); MP for Down until 1929; MP for North Down from 1929	7 June 1921	24 November 1940	19 years, 170 days	Ulster Unionist Party	1921; 1925; 1929; 1933; 1938	Craigavon ministry	
2		John Miller Andrews (1871–1956); MP for Mid Down	25 November 1940	1 May 1943	2 years, 157 days	Ulster Unionist Party	—	Andrews ministry	
3		Sir Basil Brooke (Note: Created the Viscount Brookeborough in 1952.) (1888–1973); MP for Lisnaskea	1 May 1943	25 March 1963	19 years, 328 days	Ulster Unionist Party	1945; 1949; 1953; 1958; 1962	Brookeborough ministry	
4		Terence O'Neill (1914–1990); MP for Bannside	25 March 1963	1 May 1969	6 years, 37 days	Ulster Unionist Party	1965; 1969	O'Neill ministry	
5		James Chichester-Clark (1923–2002); MP for South Londonderry	1 May 1969	23 March 1971	1 year, 326 days	Ulster Unionist Party	—	Chichester-Clark ministry	
6		Brian Faulkner (1921–1977); MP for East Down until 1972; MLA for South Down from 1973	23 March 1971	30 March 1972	1 year, 7 days	Ulster Unionist Party	—	Faulkner ministry	
6		Brian Faulkner (1921–1977); MP for East Down until 1972; MLA for South Down from 1973	1 January 1974	28 May 1974	147 days	Ulster Unionist Party	1973	1974 Executive	
First Ministers
1		David Trimble (1944–2022); MLA for Upper Bann	1 July 1998	14 October 2002	4 years, 105 days	Ulster Unionist Party	1998	First Executive	
2		Ian Paisley (1926–2014); MLA for North Antrim	8 May 2007	5 June 2008	1 year, 28 days	Democratic Unionist Party	2007	Second Executive	
3		Peter Robinson (born 1948); MLA for Belfast East	5 June 2008	11 January 2016	7 years, 220 days	Democratic Unionist Party	2011	Second Executive (2008–2011) Third Executive (2011–2016)	
4		Arlene Foster (born 1970); MLA for Fermanagh and South Tyrone	11 January 2016	9 January 2017	364 days	Democratic Unionist Party	2016; 2017	Fourth Executive	
4		Arlene Foster (born 1970); MLA for Fermanagh and South Tyrone	11 January 2020	14 June 2021	1 year, 154 days	Democratic Unionist Party	2016; 2017	Fifth Executive	
5		Paul Givan (born 1981); MLA for Lagan Valley	17 June 2021	3 February 2022	231 days	Democratic Unionist Party	—	Fifth Executive	
6		Michelle O'Neill (born 1977); MLA for Mid Ulster	3 February 2024	Incumbent	2 years, 194 days	Sinn Féin	2022	Sixth Executive	
Deputy First Ministers
1		Seamus Mallon (1936–2020); MLA for Newry and Armagh	1 July 1998	6 November 2001	3 years, 128 days	Social Democratic and Labour Party	1998	First Executive	
2		Mark Durkan (born 1960); MLA for Foyle	6 November 2001	14 October 2002	342 days	Social Democratic and Labour Party	—	First Executive	
3		Martin McGuinness (1950–2017); MLA for Mid Ulster until 2016; MLA for Foyle from 2016	8 May 2007	9 January 2017	9 years, 246 days	Sinn Féin	2007; 2011; 2016	Second Executive (2007–2011) Third Executive (2011–2016) Fourth Executive (2016–2017)	
4		Michelle O'Neill (born 1977); MLA for Mid Ulster	11 January 2020	3 February 2022	2 years, 23 days	Sinn Féin	2017	Fifth Executive	
5		Emma Little-Pengelly (born 1979); MLA for Lagan Valley	3 February 2024	Incumbent	2 years, 194 days	Democratic Unionist Party	2022	Sixth Executive	

== See also ==
- History of Northern Ireland
- Politics of Northern Ireland
- List of Irish heads of government
