= The Departments (Northern Ireland) Order 1999 =

The Departments (Northern Ireland) Order 1999 set out new devolved Northern Ireland government departments and the Northern Ireland Executive.

== Departments created ==
The Departments (NI) Order 1999 created the following departments:

- Office of the First Minister and deputy First Minister
- Department of Agriculture and Rural Development
- Department of Culture, Arts and Leisure
- Department of Education
- Department of Enterprise, Trade and Investment
- Department of the Environment
- Department of Finance and Personnel
- Department of Health, Social Services and Public Safety
- Department of Higher and Further Education, Training and Employment (later called the Department for Employment and Learning)
- Department for Regional Development
- Department for Social Development
