= DELNI =

DELNI may refer to:

- Department for Employment and Learning of Northern Ireland, a defunct government department in Northern Ireland
- Digital Ethernet Local Network Interconnect, a multiport Ethernet transceiver manufactured by Digital Equipment Corporation in the 1980s.
