= Steps to Work =

Northern Ireland employment scheme

Steps to Work is a welfare-to-work employment scheme that operates in Northern Ireland. The scheme is administered by the Department for Employment and Learning. Participants in the scheme have their benefits 'topped up' and can claim for transport costs while undertaking work experience placements. Critics have argued that the scheme exploits vulnerable people who risk losing their benefits if they do not participate.
