= Líofa =

Líofa (English: Fluent) is an initiative headquartered in Belfast, which aims to assist people in Northern Ireland who wish to support and become fluent speakers of the Irish language (Gaeilge). It was founded in 2011 by the Northern Ireland Executive's Minister of Culture, Arts and Leisure, Carál Ní Chuilín.

== Líofa bursary controversy ==
As part of the project, the Department of Culture, Arts and Leisure set up the Líofa Gaeltacht Bursary Scheme, whereby people can apply to attend summer courses. The Department for Communities took over responsibility for the initiative in May 2016 following the Fresh Start Agreement. On 23 December 2016, the Democratic Unionist Party Minister for Communities Paul Givan removed £55,000 of funding from the scheme. The money funded annual trips for 100 Northern Irish disadvantaged young people to the Donegal Gaeltacht, where they would attend Irish language classes. Martin McGuinness said the DUP's decision to remove funding from the Líofa budget was a factor for his resignation as Deputy First Minister of Northern Ireland.

Givan came under pressure to reinstate the funding and he said that the original decision to cut the funding was "not political". Gerry Adams, Sinn Féin leader, called Givan an "ignoramus" and called the decision "ignorant". Givan's decision spurred protests outside the headquarters of the Department for Communities in Belfast. As the protests were happening, Givan tweeted that he was reinstating the bursaries after he "found the necessary funding". Furthermore, he said he "was not prepared to allow Sinn Féin to use that £50,000 as a political weapon against us [the DUP] in the upcoming election as a tool to rally their troops, and so I've taken that away from them". Givan's decision was welcomed by Irish language groups, but they insisted on an Irish Language Act to be a feature of any crisis talks.

== See also ==
- Department for Communities
- Irish language in Northern Ireland
- Foras na Gaeilge
