= Land and Property Services =

Northern Irish executive agency

Executive Agency overview
- Jurisdiction: Northern Ireland
- Headquarters: Lanyon Plaza, 7 Lanyon Place, BT1 3LP (Belfast)
- Parent department: Department of Finance (DoF)
- Website: www.finance-ni.gov.uk/articles/land-property-services-lps/

The Land and Property Services (LPS, Irish: Seirbhísí Talún & Maoine) is an agency of the Department of Finance of the Northern Ireland Executive. The agency, created in 2008, includes the Ordnance Survey of Northern Ireland (the OSNI).
