= Northern Ireland Department of the Home Office =

Before partition, Ireland was governed through the Dublin Castle administration and the Home Office was also responsible for Irish affairs. From 1924 to 1972, Northern Ireland affairs were handled by the Northern Ireland Department of the Home Office. In August 1969, for example, Home Secretary James Callaghan approved the sending of British Army soldiers to Northern Ireland.

As the Troubles worsened, the UK Government was increasingly concerned that the Northern Ireland Government (at Stormont) was losing control of the situation. On 24 March 1972, it announced that direct rule from Westminster would be introduced. This took effect on 30 March 1972.

The last Deputy Secretary in charge of the Northern Ireland Department within the Home Office was Philip Woodfield who was promoted to this post in 1972 just before it became the Northern Ireland Office.
