= Prime Minister of Ireland (disambiguation) =

The Taoiseach is the head of government of the Republic of Ireland, whose territory covers the island of Ireland, save Northern Ireland, which is a self-governing part of the United Kingdom.

Prime Minister of Ireland or First Minister of Ireland may also refer to:

== Northern Ireland ==
- Prime Minister of Northern Ireland (1921–1972), who was appointed by the Governor of Northern Ireland based on the composition of the House of Commons of Northern Ireland, the lower house of its devolved Parliament
- First Minister and Deputy First Minister of Northern Ireland, the co-heads of government of Northern Ireland, elected by the Northern Ireland Assembly on the basis of consociationalism (called cross-community voting in the laws of the region)

== Republic of Ireland ==
- President of the Executive Council of the Irish Free State (1922–1937), the head of government or prime minister of the Irish Free State
- Chief Secretary for Ireland (1566–1922), the chief minister of Ireland while under British rule

== See also ==
- List of Irish heads of government
- List of heads of government of Northern Ireland
