= List of Northern Ireland Executives =

This is a list of all Northern Ireland Assemblies and the Northern Ireland Executives established under the Good Friday Agreement, from the election of the first Assembly in 1998 and the restoration of devolved government for Northern Ireland in 1999.

== List ==
=== 1st Assembly (MLAs) ===
Term	Executive	First Minister	Deputy	Parties (Ministries)
1998–2002	1st	David Trimble	Seamus Mallon	UUP (4)
1998–2002	1st	David Trimble	Seamus Mallon	SDLP (4)
1998–2002	1st	David Trimble	Mark Durkan	DUP (2)
1998–2002	1st	David Trimble	Mark Durkan	SF (2)
=== 2nd Assembly (MLAs) ===
Term	Executive	First Minister	Deputy	Parties (Ministries)
2003–2007	Suspended	Vacant	Vacant	None
=== 3rd Assembly (MLAs) ===
Term	Executive	First Minister	Deputy	Parties (Ministries)
2007–2011	2nd	Ian Paisley	Martin McGuinness	DUP (5)
2007–2011	2nd	Ian Paisley	Martin McGuinness	SF (4)
2007–2011	2nd	Peter Robinson	Martin McGuinness	UUP (2)
2007–2011	2nd	Peter Robinson	Martin McGuinness	SDLP (1)
2007–2011	2nd	Peter Robinson	Martin McGuinness	APNI (1)
=== 4th Assembly (MLAs) ===
Term	Executive	First Minister	Deputy	Parties (Ministries)
2011–2016	3rd	Peter Robinson	Martin McGuinness	DUP (5 until 2015, 6 from 2015) (Note: The UUP served in the Third Executive from 2011–2015, occupying one seat. The party withdrew from the Executive in October 2015, with the DUP taking over their vacant seat.)
2011–2016	3rd	Peter Robinson	Martin McGuinness	SF (4)
2011–2016	3rd	Peter Robinson	Martin McGuinness	APNI (2)
2011–2016	3rd	Peter Robinson	Martin McGuinness	SDLP (1)
2011–2016	3rd	Arlene Foster	Martin McGuinness	UUP (1 until 2015)
=== 5th Assembly (MLAs) ===
Term	Executive	First Minister	Deputy	Parties (Ministries)
2016–2017	4th	Arlene Foster	Martin McGuinness	DUP (5)
2016–2017	4th	Arlene Foster	Martin McGuinness	SF (4)
2016–2017	4th	Arlene Foster	Martin McGuinness	Independent (1) (Note: The Minister of Justice is not allocated through the D'Hondt mechanism because it is a contentious position. It was offered to Claire Sugden, an independent politician, who accepted the role and she was elected on a cross-community vote in the Northern Ireland Assembly. All other positions in the Executive are allocated through the D'Hondt mechanism.)
=== 6th Assembly (MLAs) ===
Term	Executive	First Minister	Deputy	Parties (Ministries)
2020 (Note: While MLAs were elected in 2017, the Executive was not established until 2020 due to disagreements between parties in the aftermath of the Renewable Heat Incentive scandal.)–2022	5th	Arlene Foster	Michelle O'Neill	DUP (4)
2020–2022	5th	Arlene Foster	Michelle O'Neill	SF (3)
2020–2022	5th	Arlene Foster	Michelle O'Neill	SDLP (1)
2020–2022	5th	Paul Givan	Michelle O'Neill	UUP (1)
2020–2022	5th	Paul Givan	Michelle O'Neill	APNI (1) (Note: The Minister of Justice is not allocated through the D'Hondt mechanism because it is a contentious position. It was offered to Naomi Long, the leader of the Alliance Party, who accepted the role and she was elected on a cross-community vote in the Northern Ireland Assembly. All other positions in the Executive are allocated through the D'Hondt mechanism.)
=== 7th Assembly (MLAs) ===
Term	Executive	First Minister	Deputy	Parties (Ministries)
2024–present	6th	Michelle O'Neill	Emma Little-Pengelly	SF (4)
2024–present	6th	Michelle O'Neill	Emma Little-Pengelly	DUP (3)
2024–present	6th	Michelle O'Neill	Emma Little-Pengelly	APNI (2)
2024–present	6th	Michelle O'Neill	Emma Little-Pengelly	UUP (1)

== See also ==
- List of British ministries
- List of Scottish Governments
- List of Welsh Governments
