= Ordnance Survey of Northern Ireland =

Northern Irish mapping agency

Ordnance Survey of Northern Ireland (OSNI) is the official mapping agency of Northern Ireland. The agency ceased to exist separately on 1 April 2008 when it became part of Land and Property Services, an executive agency of the Northern Ireland Department of Finance and Personnel, along with the Rate Collection Agency, the Valuation and Lands Agency, and the Land & Property Services.

== Description ==
It was an Executive Agency within the Department of Culture, Arts and Leisure in the Northern Ireland Executive.

The Ordnance Surveys of Northern Ireland, Great Britain and the Republic of Ireland share a common heritage: the British Ordnance Survey (OS) ceased to map Ireland just before the creation of the Irish Free State in 1922 (the Partition of Ireland having already taken place in May 1921 with the creation of Northern Ireland). The new Ordnance Survey of Northern Ireland (OSNI) officially came into existence on 1 January 1922, while the new Ordnance Survey of Ireland (OSI) came into being slightly later, on 1 April 1922.

== Products ==
The vast majority of OSNI's income came from the licensing of its digital mapping data, which, because of the long history of mapping in Ireland (see Ordnance Survey) is amongst the most detailed and comprehensive in the world. Digital products range from the Large Scale (1:1250 urban and 1:2500 rural) vector database, 1:10,000 raster mapping derived automatically from the L/S vector, 1:50,000 and 1:250,00 vectors, 1;10,000 orthophotography, 1:25,000 leisure maps, the 1:50,000 raster series, 1:250,000 Ireland North raster, street maps of the main conurbations, as well as paper derivatives of all the raster products.

In 2005 OSNI began, with the Public Records Office of Northern Ireland (PRONI), to digitise the complete set of historical maps dating back to the 1830s. (The earliest comprehensive and accurately surveyed large scale mapping in the world). These are being georectified to match modern mapping projections and are being annotated with points of interest from PRONI's archives.

OSNI also maintained the UK's only common address database, Pointer, which cross matches and validates the address data from the Royal Mail, Valuation and Lands Agency, OSNI and local authorities, and georeferences each address, as well as giving it a unique identifier. This allows spatial interrogation by customers of the >800,000 addresses in NI using computerised Geographic Information Systems (GIS) combined with digital mapping and the customer's own data.

Supporting the interconnectivity of Geographical Information (GI) for the benefit of the Northern Ireland economy, society and administration was OSNI's primary purpose. In support of this, OSNI also provides the secretariat for Mosaic, the GI strategy for Northern Ireland, which is the first such strategy to be implemented in the UK. In support of Mosaic, OSNI is currently (2006) building a GeoHub for the region, which will be able to host and connect to spatial data from multiple sources, permit a metadata (data about the data) search and, using thin client browser applications, via the Internet, permit multiple data layers to be interrogated, connected, analysed, licensed, downloaded, uploaded and updated.

Starting in Spring 2006, OSNI's own full product range became available via a map-enabled e-commerce website. OSNI's surveying technology is based on both photogrammetry and ground survey using total station electronic theodolites in combination with pen (tablet) computers, so that the data is updated directly into the digital format. The photogrammetry (using flight-derived stereo imagery at high resolution) is also used to maintain height models of the topography (Digital Terrain Model or DTM). Computer software permits the draping of aerial photography and/or mapping over such models for the purposes of fly-through or drive-through 3D visualisations. OSNI's Geodesy section maintains the positional reference system to millimetre precision and OSNI's ground stations allow high accuracy use of GPS.

== See also ==
- Irish grid reference system, the old coordinate system for Ireland.
- Irish Transverse Mercator, the new coordinate system.
- Ordnance Survey
- Ordnance Survey Ireland
- List of Government departments and agencies in Northern Ireland
