= Philip Woodfield =

British Civil servant

Sir Philip John Woodfield, KCB, CBE (10 August 1923 – 17 September 2000) was a British civil servant.

== Life and career ==
Woodfield was born in Dulwich, south-east London, and attended Alleyn's School, Dulwich. He was commissioned in the Royal Artillery in 1942, rising to become a captain before leaving the Army in 1947. He read English at King's College London. He then joined the Home Office in 1950 and became Assistant Private Secretary to the Secretary of State, Viscount Kilmuir. In 1955, he was seconded for two years to the Federal Government of Nigeria, to assist in the preparations for that country's independence.

In 1961 he became Private Secretary dealing with parliamentary and home affairs, in which function he served three prime ministers: Harold Macmillan, Alec Douglas-Home and Harold Wilson. He returned to the Home Office in 1965 as an Assistant Secretary, and he was appointed secretary to Commonwealth Immigration Commission, which was headed by Admiral-of-the-Fleet Lord Mountbatten. When Mountbatten later undertook an inquiry into prison security, following a number of highly publicized escapes from jail, he asked that Woodfield be assigned to it as its secretary. Woodfield was then promoted to be Under-Secretary in the Prison Department of the Home Office, charged with the responsibility of implementing the recommendations of the commission that had been accepted by the Secretary of State, Roy Jenkins.

Woodfield was promoted to Deputy Secretary in charge of the Northern Ireland Department of the Home Office in 1972, which would soon become the Northern Ireland Office and was promoted to Permanent Under-Secretary of State in 1981.

In his role at the Northern Ireland Office Woodfield participated in what is now believed to have been the first meeting between the Irish Republican Army and senior officials of the British Government. The meeting place on 20 June 1972 in extreme secrecy at a house owned by Colonel Sir Michael McCorkell at Ballyarnett, near Derry's border with County Donegal. The IRA was represented at that meeting by Dáithí Ó Conaill, a senior republican strategist, and Gerry Adams, and the British government was represented by Frank Steele, believed to be an MI6 agent, and Woodfield. Six days later, on 26 June 1972, the IRA implemented a "bilateral" ceasefire, and an IRA delegation attended a secret meeting with the British Government at a Minister's home in Cheyne Walk in Chelsea. Woodfield and Steele also represented the British Government at that meeting, along with William Whitelaw, Secretary of State for Northern Ireland, and Paul Channon, a millionaire Guinness heir and minister of state at the Northern Ireland Office; the IRA was again represented by Adams and Ó Conaill, along with Seán MacStiofáin, the leader of the delegation, Séamus Twomey, Martin McGuinness, Ivor Bell, and Myles Shevlin, a solicitor.

Woodfield retired from the Home Office 1983 and was knighted the same year. He continued to work on a variety of special assignments. From 1984 to 1991 he chaired the London and Metropolitan Staff Commission, which dealt with the problems for staff created by the winding-up of the metropolitan counties. He served for eight years from 1987 as the first Staff Commissioner for the Security and Intelligence Services (including the Secret Intelligence Service (SIS or MI6) and the Security Service (MI5)), set up after the Michael Bettaney case to provide an external "ombudsman" to whom members and former members of those services could turn for counsel if they had grievances or concerns. In 1987 he became chairmanship of a Scrutiny of the Supervision of Charities, which produced a Report that resulted in the Charities Bill of 1991. He also conducted reviews of the British Transport Police (1987) and the Women's Royal Voluntary Service (the WRVS) (1991); and he served on the Royal Commission on Criminal Justice from 1991 to 1993. After 1994, he supervised the winding-up of the Irish Soldiers and Sailors Land Trust.

Woodfield died in London on 17 September 2000.
