= DfI Rivers =

Water management body in Northern Ireland

DfI Rivers is the statutory flood defence and drainage authority for Northern Ireland under the terms of the Drainage (Northern Ireland) Order 1973. DfI Rivers is a directorate and executive agency of the Department for Infrastructure (DfI), in the Northern Ireland Executive.

DfI is the competent authority for the implementation of the EU Floods Directive and has delegated the day to day delivery of the directive to DfI Rivers.

The DfI Rivers headquarters is located in Cookstown. It has regional headquarters in Lisburn and Omagh and offices in Coleraine, Craigavon and Ballinamallard.
