= Department of Agriculture, Environment and Rural Affairs =

Northern Irish government department

- Irish: An Roinn Talmhaíochta, Comhshaoil agus Gnóthaí Tuaithe; Ulster-Scots: Depairtment o' Fairmin, Environment an' Kintra Matthers

Department overview
- Formed: June 1921 (as Ministry of Agriculture)
- Preceding Department: Dublin Castle administration
- Jurisdiction: Northern Ireland
- Headquarters: Jubilee House, 111 Ballykelly Road, Ballykelly, Limavady, BT49 9HP
- Employees: 3,040 (March 2019)
- Annual budget: £192.3 million (resource) & £291.8 million (capital) for 2018–19
- Minister responsible: Andrew Muir
- Department executive: Katrina Godfrey, Permanent Secretary
- Website: www.daera-ni.gov.uk

The Department of Agriculture, Environment and Rural Affairs (DAERA; initials pronounced as 'Dare-aa') (Irish: An Roinn Talmhaíochta, Comhshaoil agus Gnóthaí Tuaithe; Ulster Scots: Depairtment o' Fairmin, Environment an' Kintra Matthers) is a government department in the Northern Ireland Executive, the devolved administration for Northern Ireland. The minister with overall responsibility for the department is the Minister of Agriculture, Environment and Rural Affairs. The department was called the Department of Agriculture and Rural Development (DARD) between 1999 and 2016. The Minister of Agriculture previously existed in the Government of Northern Ireland between 1921 and 1972, where the department was known as the Ministry of Agriculture. The current Permanent Secretary is Katrina Godfrey.

== Responsibilities ==
DAERA has responsibility for food, farming, environmental, fisheries, forestry and sustainability policy, and the development of the rural sector in Northern Ireland. It assists in the sustainable development of the agri-food, environmental, fishing and forestry sectors of the economy (having regard for the needs of the consumers, the protection of human, animal and plant health, the welfare of animals and the conservation and enhancement of the environment). It provides a business development service, a veterinary service and the College of Agriculture, Food and Rural Enterprise (CAFRE), and is responsible to the UK Government's Department for Environment, Food and Rural Affairs (Defra) for the administration of schemes affecting the whole of the United Kingdom and also oversees the application of European Union agricultural, environmental, fisheries and rural development policy to Northern Ireland. Its main counterpart in the Republic of Ireland is the Department of Agriculture, Food and the Marine.

The department has two executive agencies – the Northern Ireland Environment Agency (NIEA) and the Forest Service Northern Ireland – and also sponsors four non-departmental public bodies – the Agri-Food and Biosciences Institute (AFBI), the Agricultural Wages Board for Northern Ireland (AWB), the Livestock & Meat Commission for Northern Ireland (LMC) and the Northern Ireland Fishery Harbour Authority (NIFHA).

DAERA is anecdotally known as the Department of Agriculture by many farmers and members of the public. Agriculture (and agricultural subsidies) has a more significant role in the Northern Ireland economy than in the overall UK economy; the structure of agriculture is more similar to the sector in the Republic of Ireland. The future of agriculture is a major local issue in Brexit.

== History ==
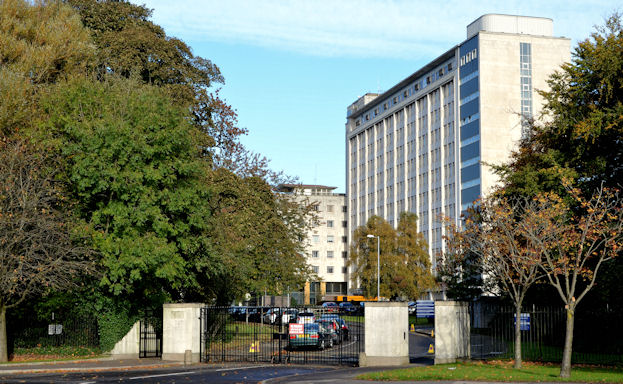
Dundonald House, former headquarters of DAERA

As with the governance of Northern Ireland more generally, the history of the department and its predecessors can be divided into the following main periods:

- Dublin Castle administration (prior to 1921)
- Government of Northern Ireland (officially the Executive Committee of the Privy Council of Northern Ireland, 1921–1972)
- direct rule administration by the United Kingdom Government (1972–1999)
- Northern Ireland Executive (1999–2017, with direct rule during suspensions)
- Northern Ireland Civil Service administration (in the absence of an Executive)

The Department of Agriculture and Technical Instruction for Ireland (DATI), established by Sir Horace Plunkett, was responsible for agricultural policy for the whole island of Ireland under the Dublin Castle administration from 1899 onwards. A separate Ministry of Agriculture was established at the foundation of Northern Ireland in 1921, with Sir Edward Archdale as its initial minister. The last Act of the Parliament of Northern Ireland was the Agriculture (Abolition of County Committees) Act (Northern Ireland) 1972, which received royal assent on 28 March 1972.

The ministry was subsequently known as the Department of Agriculture for Northern Ireland under direct rule; Northern Ireland was included in the Common Agricultural Policy (the CAP) from January 1973, when the UK joined the European Union (EU). An agricultural ministry with an Ulster Unionist Party (UUP) minister, Leslie Morrell, was included in the cross-community Northern Ireland Executive (the 'Sunningdale Executive') which was briefly established in 1974.

Following the 1998 Northern Ireland Good Friday Agreement referendum in May 1998 and the granting of royal assent to the Northern Ireland Act 1998 in November 1998, a Northern Ireland Assembly and Northern Ireland Executive were established by the United Kingdom Government. The Department of Agriculture was renamed as the Department of Agriculture and Rural Development (DARD) in December 1999 and granted a slightly reduced remit; responsibility for inland fisheries and waterways was transferred to the newly formed Department of Culture, Arts and Leisure (DCAL; pronounced as 'Dee-kaal'). Devolution was suspended for four periods, during which the department came under the responsibility of direct rule ministers from the Northern Ireland Office i.e. between 12 February 2000 and 30 May 2000; on 11 August 2001; on 22 September 2001; and (most significantly) between 15 October 2002 and 8 May 2007. Devolution was restored in May 2007.

The Department of Agriculture, Environment and Rural Affairs (DAERA) was established in May 2016, following a reduction in the number of government departments under the Fresh Start Agreement. The main changes relating to its remit were as follows:

- the new department inherited the main functions of the former Department of Agriculture and Rural Development (DARD)
- environmental regulation was transferred into its remit from the former Department of the Environment (DoE)
- the Rivers Agency (responsible for rivers and flooding policy) was transferred to the new Department for Infrastructure (DfI)
- inland fisheries was transferred back from DCAL (which had received that responsibility in 1999)
- DCAL was dissolved and inland waterways was transferred to the new Department for Communities (DfC)

Devolution continued until all ministerial offices were vacated on 26 January 2017, due to a political dispute between the Democratic Unionist Party and Sinn Féin.

== Ministers ==
Eight Ministers of Agriculture held office between 1921 and 1972, starting with Sir Edward Archdale and concluding with Harry West. During direct rule, ministers of the Northern Ireland Office were responsible for the department, including Lord Rooker and David Cairns. The following table indicates Ministers of Agriculture and Rural Development (between 1999 and 2016 inclusive) and the subsequent Minister of Agriculture, Environment and Rural Affairs.

Minister	Image	Party	Took office	Left office
Bríd Rodgers		SDLP	29 November 1999	11 February 2000
Office suspended
Bríd Rodgers		SDLP	30 May 2000	14 October 2002
Office suspended
Michelle Gildernew		Sinn Féin	8 May 2007	4 May 2011
Michelle O'Neill		Sinn Féin	16 May 2011	30 March 2016
Office renamed Minister of Agriculture, Environment and Rural Affairs (08/05/2016)
Michelle McIlveen		DUP	25 May 2016	2 March 2017
Office suspended
Edwin Poots		DUP	11 January 2020	2 February 2021
Gordon Lyons		DUP	2 February 2021	8 March 2021
Edwin Poots		DUP	8 March 2021	27 October 2022
Office suspended
Andrew Muir		Alliance	3 February 2024	Incumbent

== Finance ==
The 2016–2017 Northern Ireland Executive budget allocated a £197.9 million resource budget to DAERA:

- £82.2 million for European programmes and agricultural education
- £44 million for animal welfare, agri-food, research and fisheries
- £37.3 million for the department's veterinary service
- £27.5 million for environmental funding
- £5.1 million for the Forest Service
- £1.8 million for the Foyle, Carlingford and Irish Lights Commission

This represented a reduction from £209.8 million in the baseline budget i.e. the amount allocated for the work carried out by the previous departments with those responsibilities.

A further £48.8 million was allocated as capital expenditure:

- £18.3 million for European programmes and agricultural education
- £11.6 million for animal welfare, agri-food, research and fisheries
- £8.3 million for environmental funding
- £7.6 million for the veterinary service
- £2.7 million for the Forest Service
- £200,000 for the Foyle, Carlingford and Irish Lights Commission

The Common Agricultural Policy allocated £250.9 million in payments to farmers in Northern Ireland in 2016.

== See also ==
- Agriculture in the United Kingdom
- Committee for Agriculture and Rural Development (Northern Ireland Assembly)
- Floods directive (European Union policy)
- List of government ministers in Northern Ireland
- Rivers Agency (former responsibility)
