= Conor Murphy =

Irish politician (born 1963)

Senator Conor Murphy
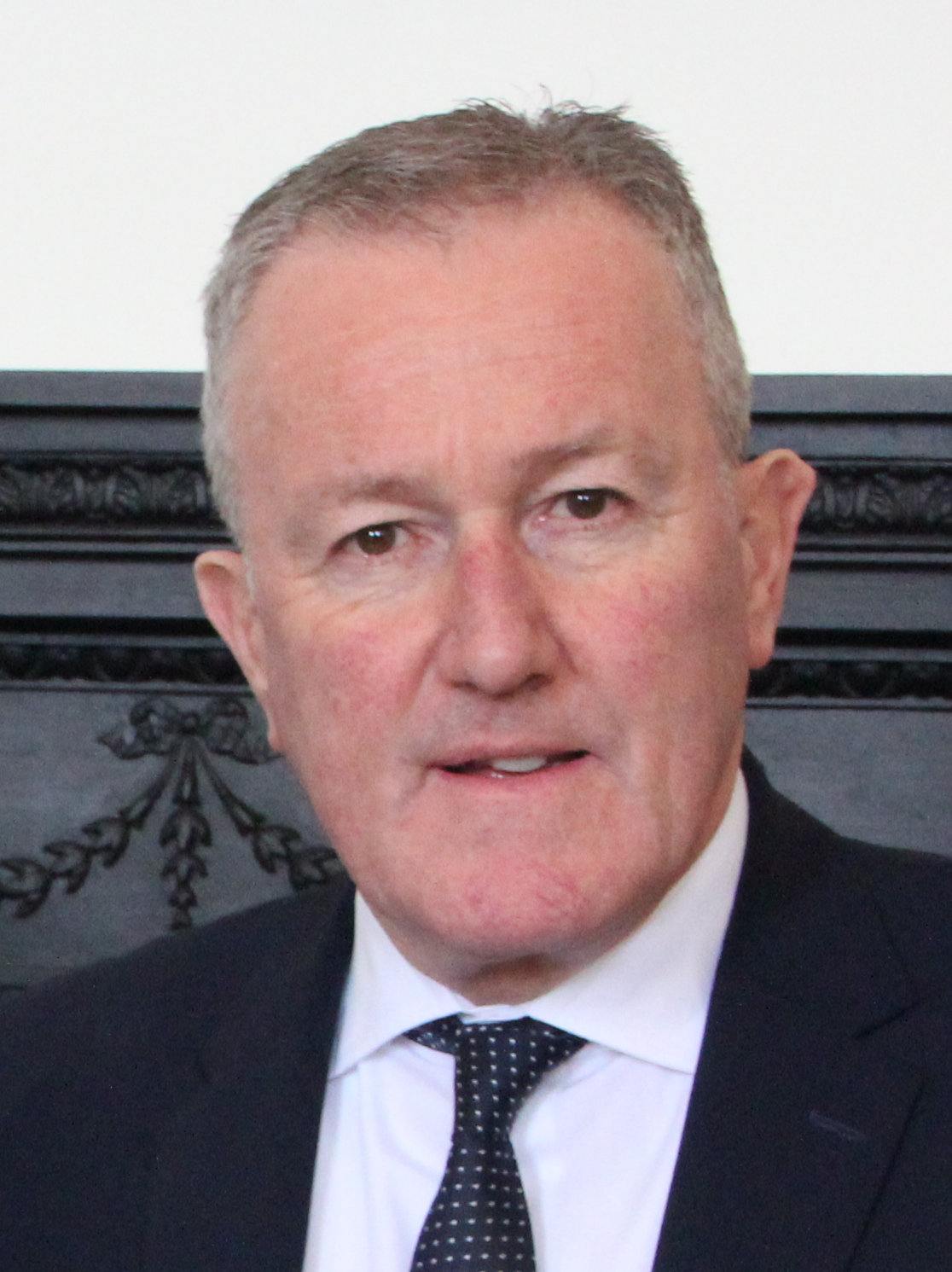
- Murphy in 2025

Leader of Sinn Féin in the Seanad
- Incumbent
- Assumed office 12 February 2025
- Leader: Mary Lou McDonald
- Preceded by: Niall Ó Donnghaile

Senator
- Incumbent
- Assumed office 30 January 2025
- Constituency: Industrial and Commercial Panel

Minister for the Economy
- In office 3 February 2024 (Note: Deirdre Hargey served as interim minister from 8 May 2024 to 28 May 2024.) – 30 January 2025
- First Minister: Michelle O'Neill
- Preceded by: Gordon Lyons (2022)
- Succeeded by: Caoimhe Archibald

Minister of Finance
- In office 11 January 2020 – 27 October 2022
- First Minister: Arlene Foster; Paul Givan; Vacant
- Preceded by: Máirtín Ó Muilleoir
- Succeeded by: Caoimhe Archibald (2024)

Minister for Regional Development
- In office 8 May 2007 – 16 May 2011
- First Minister: Ian Paisley; Peter Robinson
- Preceded by: Peter Robinson
- Succeeded by: Danny Kennedy

Member of Parliament for Newry and Armagh
- In office 5 May 2005 – 30 March 2015
- Preceded by: Seamus Mallon
- Succeeded by: Mickey Brady

Member of the Legislative Assembly for Newry and Armagh
- In office 8 June 2015 – 30 January 2025
- Preceded by: Mickey Brady
- Succeeded by: Aoife Finnegan
- In office 25 June 1998 – 2 July 2012
- Preceded by: Constituency created
- Succeeded by: Megan Fearon

Member of Newry and Mourne District Council
- In office 17 May 1989 – 21 May 1997
- Preceded by: Brendan Lewis
- Succeeded by: Brendan Lewis
- Constituency: The Fews

Personal details
- Born: 10 July 1963 (age 63) Camlough, County Armagh, Northern Ireland
- Party: Sinn Féin
- Spouse: Catherine Murphy
- Children: 2
- Education: University of Ulster; Queen's University of Belfast
- Website: Conor Murphy

Conor Terence Murphy (born 10 July 1963) is an Irish Sinn Féin politician, who has served as a senator for the Industrial and Commercial Panel since January 2025. He previously served as Minister for the Economy of Northern Ireland from 2024 to 2025. He served as a Member of the Legislative Assembly (MLA) for Newry and Armagh from 2015 until 2025, having previously served as the Member of Parliament for Newry and Armagh from 2005 to 2015, observing the Sinn Fein policy of abstentionism.

== Early life ==
Murphy was born in Camlough, South Armagh and joined the Provisional Irish Republican Army (IRA) during the 1981 hunger strikes. He attended St Colman's College in Newry, County Down, during which time he was beaten and sexually groomed by headmaster Malachy Finnegan. In 1982 he was sentenced to five years in prison for IRA membership and possession of explosives.

== Political career ==
Between 1989 and 1997, he was a Sinn Féin councillor on Newry and Mourne District Council for The Fews area, in South Armagh and South Down, and served as his party's group leader at that level.

=== Assembly elections ===
In 1998, Murphy was elected as one of his party's two Northern Ireland Assembly members for Newry and Armagh. He was re-elected, with two party colleagues, to the Assembly in 2003.

In 2001, he contested the Newry and Armagh Westminster seat, coming second to incumbent Seamus Mallon of the Social Democratic and Labour Party (SDLP). When Mallon decided not to contest the seat again, Murphy became the clear favourite to win and was elected on 5 May 2005.

=== Abstentionism and tour of UK party conferences ===
He refused to take his seat in the House of Commons of the United Kingdom in line with the abstentionist policy of Sinn Féin. In the Northern Ireland Assembly, he served as the Minister for Regional Development in the Northern Ireland Executive from 8 May 2007 until 16 May 2011. While on a tour of UK party conferences in autumn 2005, he became the first Irish republican to address the Conservative Party conference and caused controversy by refusing to express regret over the Brighton hotel bombing.

=== Tribunal over appointment of head of Northern Ireland Water ===
In 2011, while Minister for Regional Development, Murphy appointed Seán Hogan, a Catholic, as head of Northern Ireland Water, turning down the applications of four Protestants on the shortlist. A tribunal subsequently awarded £150,000 damages for discrimination to one of these applicants, Alan Lennon, judging that Hogan was appointed because "he was not from a Protestant background and because he was known to the minister and his (then Sinn Fein) ministerial colleagues Michelle Gildernew and Caitríona Ruane, who were consulted about the appointment." The tribunal found Murphy's evidence was "implausible and lack[ing] credibility", and that, during Murphy's tenure at the Department for Regional Development, there was a "material bias against the appointment of candidates from a Protestant background". Murphy disputed the finding which he said branded him "sectarian". Deputy First Minister of Northern Ireland Martin McGuinness defended him, claiming Murphy doesn't have "a sectarian bone in his body".

=== Witness in Declan Gormley case ===
In December 2012, Murphy appeared as a witness at Belfast High Court in the case of Declan Gormley, whom Murphy had sacked in 2010 from his post as a non-executive director of NI Water. Gormley sued Sinn Féin over two press releases which he argued were defamatory. Gormley was subsequently offered £80,000 in damages.

=== Controversy over comments about Paul Quinn ===
In 2007, shortly after the murder of Paul Quinn, Conor Murphy said in an interview with Spotlight that "Paul Quinn was involved with smuggling and criminality and I think that everyone accepts that."

During the 2020 Irish general election Conor Murphys' comments were a point of discussion. Breege Quinn said that her son was definitely not involved in criminality and called on Conor Murphy to withdraw his remarks and make a public apology to the Quinn family. On 6 February 2020 Conor Murphy spoke to RTÉ and said that he had withdrawn the remarks he had made in 2007 and apologised to the Quinn family. Breege Quinn repeated her call for him to resign as Minister for Finance at Stormont. She said he "should finish off and get justice" for the Quinn family. She said he should "go and tell the PSNI and the Gardaí exactly who he was speaking to" in the IRA after the murder. She said she would not meet Conor Murphy until he "comes out publicly saying that he is going to the PSNI to give the names of the IRA that he spoke to in Cullyhanna".

=== Seanad election ===
Murphy contested the 2025 Seanad election for the Industrial and Commercial Panel. He confirmed that if elected he would resign from the Northern Ireland Assembly. Murphy dismissed claims that his candidacy was part of an attempt by the party to bolster its political team in the Republic saying that it was "very much about the constitutional debate [about reunification]". He was elected on the final count. He was replaced as minister by Caoimhe Archibald. On 12 February 2025, Murphy was appointed as Leader of Sinn Féin in the Seanad.

== Personal life ==
Murphy lives in Camlough with his wife, Catherine, and two children. His brother Declan is a district councillor in Newry, Mourne and Down.

Northern Ireland Assembly
New assembly	MLA for Newry and Armagh; 1998–2012	Succeeded by Megan Fearon
Preceded by Mickey Brady	MLA for Newry and Armagh; 2015–present	Incumbent
Parliament of the United Kingdom
Preceded by Seamus Mallon	Member of Parliament for Newry and Armagh; 2005–2015	Succeeded by Mickey Brady
Political offices
Preceded by Mairtin O Muilleoir	Minister of Finance; 2020–2022	Succeeded by Caoimhe Archibald (2024)
Vacant Office suspended Title last held by Peter Robinson	Minister for Regional Development; 2007–2011	Succeeded by Danny Kennedy
