= Department of Education (Northern Ireland) =

Northern Irish government department

Coordinates: 54.640°N 5.676°W

- An Roinn Oideachais (Irish); Depairtment o Learin (Ulster Scots)

Department overview
- Formed: June 1921 (as Ministry of Education)
- Preceding Department: Dublin Castle administration
- Jurisdiction: Northern Ireland
- Headquarters: Rathgael House, Balloo Road, Bangor, County Down, BT19 7PR
- Employees: 609 (September 2011)
- Annual budget: £1,894.6 million (current) & £114.7 million (capital) for 2011–12
- Minister responsible: Paul Givan
- Department executive: Mark Browne, Permanent Secretary
- Website: www.education-ni.gov.uk

The Department of Education (DENI; Irish: An Roinn Oideachais; Ulster Scots: Depairtment o Learin) is a devolved Northern Irish government department in the Northern Ireland Executive. The minister with overall responsibility for the department is the Minister of Education.

== Aim ==
The department's overall vision is "to ensure that every learner fulfils her or his potential at each stage of development". Its key stated priorities are: raising Standards for all; closing the performance gap, increasing access and equality; developing the education workforce; improving the "learning environment"; and transforming education management.

== Responsibilities ==
The department is responsible for the pre-school, primary, post-primary and special levels of education. Until 2016 the former Department for Employment and Learning was responsible for further and higher education policy in Northern Ireland, but these are now the responsibility of the Department for the Economy. Administration of the education system is delegated to the Education Authority, a single combined authority, funded by the department.

The Department of Education also covers youth policy, community relations within and between schools, and teacher education and salaries. As an organisation, its key functions include advising the minister on the determination of education policy, framing legislation, accounting for the effectiveness of the education system, allocating, and monitoring and accounting for resources.

Through the Education and Training Inspectorate, it evaluates and reports on the quality of teaching and learning and teacher education. The Education and Training Inspectorate has responsibility for inspecting educational institutions.

Its main counterpart in the UK Government is the Department for Education. The main counterpart in the Irish Government is the Department of Education and Youth.

== History ==
A Ministry of Education was established at the foundation of Northern Ireland in June 1921 and was subsequently renamed the Department of Education under direct rule, introduced in March 1972. An education ministry was also included in the Northern Ireland Executive briefly formed in 1974. The department's remit under direct rule was much wider, incorporating cultural and sport policy (now held by the Department of Culture, Arts and Leisure) and further and higher education (now held by the Department for Employment and Learning).

Following a referendum on the Belfast Agreement on 23 May 1998 and the granting of royal assent to the Northern Ireland Act 1998 on 19 November 1998, a Northern Ireland Assembly and Northern Ireland Executive were established by the United Kingdom Government under Prime Minister Tony Blair. The Department of Education (with its reduced remit) was therefore one of the six direct rule Northern Ireland departments that continued in existence after devolution, following the Northern Ireland Act 1998 and The Departments (Northern Ireland) Order 1999.

A devolved minister took office on 2 December 1999. Devolution was suspended for four periods, during which the department came under the responsibility of direct rule ministers from the Northern Ireland Office:

- between 12 February 2000 and 30 May 2000;
- on 11 August 2001;
- on 22 September 2001;
- between 15 October 2002 and 8 May 2007.

Since 8 May 2007, devolution has operated without interruption. On 11 January 2012, the First Minister and deputy First Minister, Peter Robinson and Martin McGuinness respectively, announced their intention to abolish the Department for Employment and Learning.

Its functions would be "divided principally" between the Department of Education and the Department of Enterprise, Trade and Investment "in an agreed manner". The proposal was resisted by the Alliance Party, which viewed it as "power grab" by the Democratic Unionist Party and Sinn Féin, but was approved on 18 January 2012. No timescale for the abolition was outlined and the department remained in operation, as of late March 2012.

From 2 December 1999 to 25 May 2016, the department was headed by Sinn Féin legislators. It was not until 25 May 2016 that the Democratic Unionist Party (DUP)'s Peter Weir became the first non-Sinn Féin politician to head the Northern Ireland Department of Education.

In 2020, the Department established the Exceptional Circumstances Body to consider applications from parents where it is claimed that a child must attend a specified post-primary school, and no other post-primary school, for exceptional reasons.

== Ministers of education ==
Minister	Image	Party	Took office	Left office
Martin McGuinness		Sinn Féin	29 November 1999	11 February 2000
Office suspended
Martin McGuinness		Sinn Féin	30 May 2000	14 October 2002
Office suspended
Caitríona Ruane		Sinn Féin	14 May 2007	4 May 2011
John O'Dowd		Sinn Féin	16 May 2011	30 March 2016
Peter Weir		DUP	25 May 2016	2 March 2017
Office suspended
Peter Weir		DUP	11 January 2020	13 June 2021
Michelle McIlveen		DUP	14 June 2021	27 October 2022
Office suspended
Paul Givan		DUP	3 February 2024	Incumbent

=== Direct rule ministers ===
During the periods of suspension, the following ministers of the Northern Ireland Office/Education Secretaries of the British Department for Education were responsible for the department:

- George Howarth (2000)
- Jane Kennedy (2002–04)
- Barry Gardiner (2002–04)
- Angela Smith (2005–06)
- Maria Eagle (2006–07)

== See also ==
- Committee for Education
- List of government ministers in Northern Ireland
- For the inspection responsibilities: Estyn, Ofsted, Education Scotland
