= Department for Employment and Learning =

Defunct Northern Irish government department

- An Roinn Fostaíochta agus Foghlama; Ulster Scots: Depairtment for Employ an Learnin

Department overview
- Formed: December 1999 (as Department of Higher and Further Education, Training and Employment)
- Preceding Department: Department of Economic Development & Department of Education
- Dissolved: 6 May 2016
- Superseding Department: Department for the Economy Department for Communities
- Jurisdiction: Northern Ireland
- Headquarters: Adelaide House, 39–49 Adelaide Street, Belfast, BT2 8FD
- Employees: 2,111 (September 2011)
- Annual budget: £787.3 million (current), £41.2 million (capital) for 2011–12
- Website: www.delni.gov.uk

The Department for Employment and Learning (DEL) (Irish: An Roinn Fostaíochta agus Foghlama; Ulster Scots: Depairtment for Employ an Learnin) was a devolved Northern Ireland government department in the Northern Ireland Executive. The minister with overall responsibility for the department was the Minister for Employment and Learning.

The department was initially known as the Department of Higher and Further Education, Training and Employment, between 1999 and 20 July 2001.

Following the Fresh Start Agreement of November 2015, DEL was dissolved and its functions transferred to the Department for the Economy and Department for Communities, in order to reduce the size of the Northern Ireland Executive.

== Aim ==
DEL's overall aim was to "promote learning and skills, to prepare people for work and to support the economy".

== Responsibilities ==
The department's network of 'job centres' and 'jobs and benefits offices' advertised job opportunities for Northern Ireland residents. It was also responsible for policy in the following areas:

- further education
- higher education
- skills and training
- employment rights and responsibilities

The Department of Education was responsible for all other levels of education in Northern Ireland. DEL's main counterparts in the United Kingdom Government were:

- the Department for Business, Innovation and Skills (including employment relations); and
- the Department for Work and Pensions (on general employment policy).

In the Irish Government, its main counterparts were:

- the Department of Education and Youth;
- the Department of Enterprise, Tourism and Employment (on employment).

== History ==
Following a referendum on the Belfast Agreement on 23 May 1998 and the granting of royal assent to the Northern Ireland Act 1998 on 19 November 1998, a Northern Ireland Assembly and Northern Ireland Executive were established by the United Kingdom Government under Prime Minister Tony Blair. The process was known as devolution and was set up to return devolved legislative powers to Northern Ireland. DEL is one of five new devolved Northern Ireland departments created in December 1999 by the Northern Ireland Act 1998 and The Departments (Northern Ireland) Order 1999.

The department was initially known as the Department of Higher and Further Education, Training and Employment (DHFETE), between 1999 and 20 July 2001, but this was changed under the Department for Employment and Learning Act (Northern Ireland) 2001 to the present name. According to the then minister, Sean Farren, "Its undue length causes practical problems and its acronym, DHFETE, is unfortunate."

A devolved minister first took office on 2 December 1999. Devolution was suspended for four periods, during which the department came under the responsibility of direct rule ministers from the Northern Ireland Office:

- between 12 February 2000 and 30 May 2000;
- on 11 August 2001;
- on 22 September 2001;
- between 15 October 2002 and 8 May 2007.

Since 8 May 2007, devolution has operated without interruption. The Independent Review of Economic Policy, which reported in September 2009, recommended a single economic policy department within the Northern Ireland Executive, which would result in the abolition of DEL.

On 11 January 2012, the First Minister and deputy First Minister, Peter Robinson and Martin McGuinness respectively, announced their intention to abolish the department. The department's functions would be "divided principally" between the Department of Education and the Department of Enterprise, Trade and Investment "in an agreed manner". The proposal was resisted by the Alliance Party, which viewed it as "power grab" by the Democratic Unionist Party and Sinn Féin, but was approved on 18 January 2012. No timescale for the abolition was outlined and the department remained in operation, as of February 2015.

== Ministers for Employment and Learning ==
Minister	IMage	Party	Took office	Left office
Sean Farren		SDLP	29 November 1999	11 February 2000
Office suspended				
Sean Farren		SDLP	30 May 2000	13 December 2001
Carmel Hanna		SDLP	14 December 2001	14 October 2002
Office suspended				
Sir Reg Empey		UUP	14 May 2007	27 October 2010
Danny Kennedy		UUP	27 October 2010	4 May 2011
Stephen Farry		Alliance	16 May 2011	30 March 2016

=== Direct rule ministers ===
During the periods of suspension, the following ministers of the Northern Ireland Office were responsible for the department:

- Adam Ingram (2000)
- Jane Kennedy (2002–04)
- Barry Gardiner (2004–05)
- Angela Smith (2005–06)
- Maria Eagle (2006–07)

== See also ==
- Committee for Employment and Learning (Northern Ireland Assembly)
- List of government ministers in Northern Ireland
