= Department of Health (Northern Ireland) =

Northern Irish government department

- Irish: An Roinn Sláinte; Ulster-Scots: Männystrie o Poustie

Department overview
- Formed: June 1944 (as Ministry of Health and Local Government)
- Preceding Department: Ministry of Home Affairs
- Jurisdiction: Northern Ireland
- Headquarters: Castle Buildings, Stormont Estate, Belfast, BT4 3SJ
- Employees: 731 (September 2011)
- Annual budget: £4,383.1 million (current) & £200.5 million (capital) for 2011–12
- Minister responsible: Robbie Butler
- Department executives: Mike Farrar, Interim Permanent Secretary; Sharon Gallagher, Deputy Secretary, Head of the Strategic Planning and Performance Group
- Website: www.health-ni.gov.uk

The Department of Health (DoH, Irish: An Roinn Sláinte, pronounced [ənˠ ˈɾˠiːn̠ʲ ˈsˠl̪ˠaːn̠ʲtʲə], Ulster Scots: Männystrie o Poustie) is a devolved Northern Irish government department in the Northern Ireland Executive. The minister with overall responsibility for the department is the Minister of Health.

Until 9 May 2016, the department was previously called the Department of Health, Social Services and Public Safety (Irish: An Roinn Sláinte, Seirbhísí Sóisialta agus Sábháilteachta Poiblí).

== Aim ==
DoH's overall aim and mission is to "improve the health and social well-being of the people of Northern Ireland."

The department launched a new digital strategy in August 2022. It includes the Encompass programme which will create a unified health and care record for the province.

== Responsibilities ==
The Minister, assisted by the department, makes policy and legislation in three broad areas:

- health and social care – hospitals, family practitioner services and community health and personal social services;
- public health – promoting and protecting the health and well-being of the population; and
- public safety – the Northern Ireland Fire and Rescue Service (commonly known by its former name, the Northern Ireland Fire Brigade) but not the Police Service of Northern Ireland or HM Coastguard.

Some sensitive health policy issues are reserved to Westminster and are therefore not devolved:

- human fertilisation and embryology
- human genetics
- surrogacy
- xenotransplantation

In Northern Ireland, abortion law is a criminal justice matter and is devolved. Since October 2019, abortion has been legal in Northern Ireland, with legal framework coming into effect in March 2020.

DoH's main counterparts in the United Kingdom Government are:

- the Department of Health and Social Care;
- the Ministry of Housing, Communities and Local Government (on fire services)

In the Irish Government, its main counterparts are:

- the Department of Health;
- the Department of Housing, Local Government and Heritage (on fire services).

== Health and Social Care organisations ==
The Health and Social Care system in Northern Ireland consists of the following public bodies:

Northern Ireland-wide

- Health and Social Care Board
- Northern Ireland Ambulance Service Health and Social Care Trust
- Northern Ireland Blood Transfusion Service
- Business Services Organisation
- Northern Ireland Fire and Rescue Service
- Public Health Agency
- Regulation and Quality Improvement Authority

Sub-regional health and social care trusts

- Belfast Health and Social Care Trust
- Northern Health and Social Care Trust
- South Eastern Health and Social Care Trust
- Southern Health and Social Care Trust
- Western Health and Social Care Trust

== History ==
Health policy in Northern Ireland was originally a responsibility of local government and the Ministry of Home Affairs, which (similarly to the Home Office) retained responsibility for policy areas not delegated to other ministries.

A separate Ministry of Health and Local Government was established in June 1944, as part of the welfare state. In January 1965, that department was divided between the Ministry of Development and the Ministry of Health and Social Services.

The latter ministry was renamed as the Department of Health and Social Services under direct rule, introduced in March 1972. A health and social services ministry was also included in the Northern Ireland Executive briefly established in 1974. The department was responsible for social security policy and its initials DHSS are still used locally to describe benefits and benefit claimants.

Following a referendum on the Belfast Agreement on 23 May 1998 and the granting of royal assent to the Northern Ireland Act 1998 on 19 November 1998, a Northern Ireland Assembly and Northern Ireland Executive were established by the United Kingdom Government under Prime Minister Tony Blair.

In December 1999, the Department of Health and Social Services was renamed as the Department of Health, Social Services and Public Safety. It gained responsibility for the Northern Ireland Fire Brigade from the Department of the Environment but ceded social security to the Department for Social Development. DHSSPS was therefore one of the six direct rule Northern Ireland departments to continue in existence following devolution, following the Northern Ireland Act 1998 and The Departments (Northern Ireland) Order 1999.

A devolved minister took office on 2 December 1999. Devolution was suspended for four periods, during which the department came under the responsibility of direct rule ministers from the Northern Ireland Office:

- between 12 February 2000 and 30 May 2000;
- on 11 August 2001;
- on 22 September 2001;
- between 15 October 2002 and 8 May 2007.

Since 8 May 2007, devolution has operated without interruption.

== Ministers of Health ==
Minister	Image	Party	Took office	Left office
Bairbre de Brún		Sinn Féin	29 November 1999	11 February 2000
Office suspended
Bairbre de Brún		Sinn Féin	30 May 2000	14 October 2002
Office suspended
Michael McGimpsey		UUP	14 May 2007	5 May 2011
Edwin Poots		DUP	16 May 2011	23 September 2014
Jim Wells		DUP	24 September 2014	11 May 2015
Simon Hamilton		DUP	11 May 2015	30 March 2016 (Note: Resigned on 10 September 2015, re-entered office on 16 Sept. till 17 Sept., then on 23 Sept.-24 Sept, then 28 Sept.-29 Sept., then 30 Sept.-1 Oct. 2015. Following 20 October he permanently occupies the office)
Office renamed Minister of Health
Michelle O'Neill		Sinn Féin	25 May 2016	2 March 2017
Office suspended
Robin Swann		UUP	11 January 2020	27 October 2022
Office suspended
Robin Swann		UUP	3 February 2024	29 May 2024
Mike Nesbitt		UUP	29 May 2024	18 August 2026
Robbie Butler		UUP	20 August 2026	

=== Direct rule ministers ===
During the periods of suspension, the following ministers of the Northern Ireland Office were responsible for the department:

- George Howarth (2000)
- Des Browne (2002–03)
- Angela Smith (2003–05)
- Shaun Woodward (2005–06)
- Paul Goggins (2006–07)

== See also ==
- Committee for Health, Social Services and Public Safety
- Disability in Northern Ireland
