= Department for the Economy =

Northern Irish government department

- Irish: An Roinn Geilleagair; Ulster-Scots: Depairtment fur the Economy

Department overview
- Formed: June 1921 (as Ministry of Commerce)
- Preceding Department: Dublin Castle administration
- Jurisdiction: Northern Ireland
- Headquarters: Adelaide House, 39–49 Adelaide Street, Belfast, BT2 8FD
- Employees: 582 (September 2011)
- Annual budget: £207.1 million (current) & £68.7 million (capital) for 2011–12
- Minister responsible: Caoimhe Archibald
- Department executive: Ian Snowden, Permanent Secretary
- Website: www.economy-ni.gov.uk

The Department for the Economy (DfE, Irish: An Roinn Geilleagair;
Ulster-Scots: Depairtment fur the Economy) is a devolved Northern Ireland government department in the Northern Ireland Executive. The minister with overall responsibility for the department is the Minister for the Economy.

DfE was renamed in 2016; it was previously called the Department for Enterprise, Trade and Investment.

== Aim ==
DfE's overall aim is to "promote the development of a globally competitive economy." Its stated objective is to "encourage the development of a high value added, innovative, enterprising and competitive economy, leading to greater wealth creation and job opportunities for all."

== Responsibilities ==
The department is responsible for the following policy areas:

- company registration (prior to commencement of the Companies Act 2006 on 1 October 2009)
- consumer affairs
- economic policy development
- energy
- employment law matters
- health and safety at work
- insolvency
- mineral development
- tourism

Some economic matters are reserved to Westminster and are therefore not devolved:

- the foreshore, sea bed and subsoil and their natural resources
- postal services
- import and export controls, external trade
- national minimum wage
- financial services
- financial markets
- intellectual property
- units of measurement
- telecommunications and internet services
- consumer safety in relation to goods

In addition, some matters are excepted and were not intended for devolution:

- taxation
- national insurance
- currency
- nuclear energy

DfE's main counterparts in the United Kingdom Government are:

- the Department for Business and Trade (DBT)
- the Department for Energy Security and Net Zero (DESNZ)
- the Department for Culture, Media and Sport (DCMS)

In the Irish Government, its main counterparts are:

- the Department of Enterprise, Tourism and Employment;
- the Department of Climate, Energy and the Environment;
- the Department of Transport;

== Agencies ==
DfE has four agencies, established as non-departmental public bodies (NDPBs), to assist in strategy implementation:

- Invest Northern Ireland (Invest NI), which supports business growth and inward investment, promotes innovation, research and development and in-company training, encourages exports and supports local economic development and company start up;
- the Tourism Northern Ireland (Tourism NI), which is responsible for the development, promotion and marketing of Northern Ireland as a tourist destination;
- the Health and Safety Executive for Northern Ireland (HSENI), which is responsible for health, safety and welfare at work; and
- the General Consumer Council for Northern Ireland (GCCNI), which is responsible for promoting and safeguarding the interests of consumers and campaigning for the best possible standards of service and protection.

== History ==
A Ministry of Commerce was established at the foundation of Northern Ireland in June 1921, and was subsequently known as the Department of Commerce and Department of Economic Development under direct rule (introduced in March 1972). An economic ministry was also included in the Northern Ireland Executive briefly established in 1974.

The Department of Economic Development also incorporated elements of training and employment policy, now held by the Department for Employment and Learning.

Following a referendum on the Belfast Agreement on 23 May 1998 and the granting of royal assent to the Northern Ireland Act 1998 on 19 November 1998, a Northern Ireland Assembly and Northern Ireland Executive were established by the United Kingdom Government under Prime Minister Tony Blair. The Department of Economic Development was renamed as the Department of Enterprise, Trade and Investment and granted a reduced remit. DETI was therefore one of the six direct rule Northern Ireland departments that continued in existence after devolution in December 1999, following the Northern Ireland Act 1998 and The Departments (Northern Ireland) Order 1999.

A devolved minister took office on 2 December 1999. Devolution was suspended for four periods, during which the department came under the responsibility of direct rule ministers from the Northern Ireland Office:

- between 12 February 2000 and 30 May 2000;
- on 11 August 2001;
- on 22 September 2001;
- between 15 October 2002 and 8 May 2007.

Since 8 May 2007, devolution has operated without interruption. The Independent Review of Economic Policy, which reported in September 2009, recommended a single economic policy department within the Northern Ireland Executive, which would merge DETI and at least part of the Department for Employment and Learning.

On 11 January 2012, the First Minister and deputy First Minister, Peter Robinson and Martin McGuinness announced their intentions to abolish the Department for Employment and Learning. The department's functions would be "divided principally" between the Department of Education and the Department of Enterprise, Trade and Investment "in an agreed manner". The proposal was resisted by the Alliance Party, which viewed it as "power grab" by the Democratic Unionist Party and Sinn Féin, but was approved on 18 January 2012. No timescale for the abolition was outlined and the department remained in operation, as of late March 2012.

DETI was heavily criticised by the Northern Ireland Audit Office for its mismanagement of a broadband scheme starting in 2004 and carried out by Bytel Networks, which saw Bytel receive over a million euros in a European Union grant for equipment that was never used. DETI subsequently sued Bytel in an attempt to reclaim more than four million euros.

In 2016, the Renewable Heat Incentive scandal came to light which was a botched scheme that was run by DETI, now Department for the Economy. The minister in charge at the time, Arlene Foster, faced pressure to resign as the scheme cost the NI Executive £400m over 20 years.

== Ministers for the Economy ==
Minister	Image	Party	Took office	Left office
Sir Reg Empey		UUP	29 November 1999	11 February 2000
Office suspended
Sir Reg Empey		UUP	30 May 2000	14 October 2002
Office suspended
Nigel Dodds		DUP	14 May 2007	9 June 2008
Arlene Foster		DUP	9 June 2008	11 May 2015
Jonathan Bell		DUP	11 May 2015	30 March 2016 (Note: Resigned on 10 September 2015, re-entered office on 16 Sept. till 17 Sept., then on the 23 Sept.-24 Sept, then 28 Sept.-29 Sept., then 30 Sept.-1 Oct. 2015. Following the 20 October he permanently occupies the office)
Office renamed Minister for the Economy
Simon Hamilton		DUP	25 May 2016	2 March 2017
Office suspended
Diane Dodds		DUP	11 January 2020	13 June 2021
Paul Frew		DUP	14 June 2021	6 July 2021
Gordon Lyons		DUP	6 July 2021	27 October 2022
Office suspended
Conor Murphy		Sinn Féin	3 February 2024	8 May 2024
Deirdre Hargey		Sinn Féin	8 May 2024	28 May 2024
Conor Murphy		Sinn Féin	28 May 2024	3 February 2025
Caoimhe Archibald		Sinn Féin	3 February 2025	Incumbent

=== Direct rule ministers ===
During the periods of suspension, the following ministers of the Northern Ireland Office were responsible for the department:

- Adam Ingram (2000)
- Ian Pearson (2002–04)
- Barry Gardiner (2004–05)
- Angela Smith (2005–06)
- Maria Eagle (2006–07)

== See also ==
- Committee for the Economy
- List of government ministers in Northern Ireland
- For the tertiary education funding council functions, see
  - Office for Students
  - Scottish Funding Council
  - Medr (Wales)
