= Department of Finance (Northern Ireland) =

Northern Irish government department

- Irish: An Roinn Airgeadais; Ulster-Scots: Männystrie o Siller

Department overview
- Formed: June 1921 (as Ministry of Finance)
- Preceding Department: Dublin Castle administration
- Jurisdiction: Northern Ireland
- Headquarters: Clare House, 303 Airport Road, Belfast, BT3 9ED
- Employees: 3,586 (September 2011)
- Annual budget: £188.6 million (current) & £18.9 million (capital) for 2011–12
- Minister responsible: John O'Dowd
- Department executive: Neil Gibson, Permanent Secretary
- Website: www.finance-ni.gov.uk

The Department of Finance (DoF, Irish: An Roinn Airgeadais, Ulster-Scots: Männystrie o Siller) is a devolved Northern Ireland government department in the Northern Ireland Executive. The minister with overall responsibility for the department is the Minister for Finance. The incumbent Minister is John O'Dowd.

The department was previously called the Department of Finance and Personnel (DFP) before its name change on 9 May 2016.

== Aim ==
DoF's overall aim is to help the Northern Ireland Executive "secure the most appropriate and effective use of resources and services for the benefit of the community".

== Responsibilities ==
The department is responsible for the following policy areas:

- finance
- the Northern Ireland Civil Service
- land and property
- building regulation
- procurement
- civil law reform
- civil registration

Some financial matters are reserved to Westminster and are therefore not devolved:

- financial services
- financial markets

In addition, some matters are excepted and were not intended for devolution:

- taxation
- currency

DoF's main counterparts in the United Kingdom Government are:

- HM Treasury;
- the Cabinet Office (on civil service matters);
- the Ministry of Justice (on civil law reform);
- the Ministry of Housing, Communities and Local Government (on building regulation);
- HM Land Registry (on land registration).

In the Irish Government, the main counterparts are:

- the Department of Finance;
- the Department of Public Expenditure, Infrastructure, Public Service Reform and Digitalisation;
- the Department of Justice, Home Affairs and Migration (on civil law reform and land registration);
- the Department of Housing, Local Government and Heritage (on building regulation).

== Agencies and public bodies ==
=== Executive agencies ===
- Northern Ireland Statistics and Research Agency (NISRA)

=== Non-departmental public bodies ===
- Civil Service Appeals Board (CSAB)
- Legal Services Oversight Commissioner for Northern Ireland (LSOC)
- Northern Ireland Building Regulations Advisory Committee (NIBRAC)
- Northern Ireland Civil Service Pension Board (NICSPB)
- Northern Ireland Fiscal Council
- Statistics Advisory Committee (SAC)

=== Other bodies ===
- Land and Property Services (LPS)
  - Ordnance Survey of Northern Ireland (OSNI)
- Procurement Board

== History ==
A Ministry of Finance was established on the formation of Northern Ireland in June 1921. A finance ministry also existed in the 1974 Northern Ireland Executive and became known as the Department of Finance and Personnel under direct rule.

Following a referendum on the Belfast Agreement on 23 May 1998 and the granting of royal assent to the Northern Ireland Act 1998 on 19 November 1998, a Northern Ireland Assembly and Northern Ireland Executive were established by the United Kingdom Government under Prime Minister Tony Blair. The process was known as devolution and was set up to return devolved legislative powers to Northern Ireland. DFP is therefore one of six direct rule Northern Ireland departments which continued in existence after devolution in December 1999 by the Northern Ireland Act 1998 and The Departments (Northern Ireland) Order 1999.

A devolved minister first took office on 2 December 1999. Devolution was suspended for four periods, during which the department came under the responsibility of direct rule ministers from the Northern Ireland Office:

- between 12 February 2000 and 30 May 2000;
- on 11 August 2001;
- on 22 September 2001;
- between 15 October 2002 and 8 May 2007.

Since 8 May 2007, devolution has operated without interruption.

== Ministers of Finance ==
| Minister | Image | Party | Took office | Left office |
|---|---|---|---|---|
| Mark Durkan | | SDLP | 29 November 1999 | 11 February 2000 |
Office suspended
| Mark Durkan | | SDLP | 30 May 2000 | 13 December 2001 |
| Seán Farren | | SDLP | 14 December 2001 | 14 October 2002 |
Office suspended
| Peter Robinson | | DUP | 14 May 2007 | 9 June 2008 |
| Nigel Dodds | | DUP | 9 June 2008 | 1 July 2009 |
| Sammy Wilson | | DUP | 1 July 2009 | 28 July 2013 |
| Simon Hamilton | | DUP | 29 July 2013 | 11 May 2015 |
| Arlene Foster | | DUP | 11 May 2015 | 12 January 2016 |
| Mervyn Storey | | DUP | 13 January 2016 | 30 March 2016 |
Office renamed Minister of Finance
| Máirtín Ó Muilleoir | | Sinn Féin | 25 May 2016 | 2 March 2017 |
Office suspended
| Conor Murphy | | Sinn Féin | 11 January 2020 | 27 October 2022 |
Office suspended
| Caoimhe Archibald | | Sinn Féin | 3 February 2024 | 3 February 2025 |
| John O'Dowd | | Sinn Féin | 3 February 2025 | Incumbent |

=== Direct rule ministers ===
During the periods of suspension, the following ministers of the Northern Ireland Office were responsible for the department:

- Adam Ingram (2000)
- Ian Pearson (2002–05)
- Lord Rooker (2005–06)
- David Hanson (2006–07)

== See also ==
- Committee for Finance
- NIDirect
