= Northern Ireland Executive =

Devolved government of Northern Ireland

- Irish: Feidhmeannas Thuaisceart Éireann; Scots: Norlin Airlan Executive
- Devolved government

Overview
- Established: 2 December 1999; 25 years ago (current form)
- State: Northern Ireland
- Leader: First Minister and deputy First Minister (Michelle O'Neill and Emma Little-Pengelly)
- Appointed by: Northern Ireland Assembly (Note: The first and deputy first minister are nominated by the two largest parties in the Assembly. Other ministerial roles are allocated by the d’Hondt method among other parties, except for the Justice Minister brief which is determined by a cross-community vote.)
- Ministries: 9 (list)
- Responsible to: Northern Ireland Assembly
- Annual budget: £14.2 billion (2023)
- Headquarters: Stormont Castle, Stormont Estate, Belfast
- Website: www.northernireland.gov.uk

The Northern Ireland Executive (Irish: Feidhmeannas Thuaisceart Éireann, Ulster Scots: Norlin Airlan Executive) is the devolved government of Northern Ireland, an administrative branch of the legislature – the Northern Ireland Assembly, situated in Belfast. It is answerable to the assembly and was initially established according to the terms of the Northern Ireland Act 1998, which followed the Good Friday Agreement (or Belfast Agreement). The executive is referred to in the legislation as the Executive Committee of the assembly and is an example of consociationalist ("power-sharing") government.

The Northern Ireland Executive consists of the first minister and deputy first minister and various ministers with individual portfolios and remits. The main assembly parties appoint most ministers in the executive, except for the Minister of Justice who is elected by a cross-community vote. It is one of three devolved governments in the United Kingdom, the others being the Scottish and Welsh governments.

In January 2017, Sinn Féin deputy First Minister Martin McGuinness resigned in protest over the Renewable Heat Incentive scandal and the Northern Ireland Executive consequently collapsed. The governing of Northern Ireland fell to the civil service in a caretaker capacity until January 2020, when the parties signed the New Decade, New Approach agreement and an Executive was subsequently established. When Democratic Unionist Party First Minister Paul Givan resigned in line with his party's protest over the Northern Ireland Protocol, the Northern Ireland Executive collapsed again. No agreement on power-sharing was made after the 2022 Assembly election, and from October 2022 to February 2024, Northern Ireland was again governed by the civil service. On 3 February 2024, Sinn Féin's Michelle O'Neill was appointed First Minister, the first Irish nationalist to be appointed to the position, with DUP's Emma Little-Pengelly as deputy First Minister.

== Legal basis ==
The Executive (and the Assembly) were established in law by the Northern Ireland Act 1998 that followed the Good Friday Agreement and its basis was revised by the Northern Ireland (St Andrews Agreement) Act 2006 that followed the St Andrews Agreement of that year.

== Ministers ==
On 9 May 2016, the number of ministries and departments of the Northern Ireland Executive was reduced, leaving the following departments:

- Executive Office
- Department of Agriculture, Environment and Rural Affairs
- Department for Communities
- Department of Education
- Department for the Economy
- Department of Finance
- Department of Health
- Department for Infrastructure
- Department of Justice

At the same time, various departments were renamed as follows:

- Office of the First Minister and deputy First Minister was renamed Executive Office
- Department of Agriculture and Rural Development was renamed Department of Agriculture, Environment and Rural Affairs
- Department of Enterprise, Trade and Investment was renamed Department for the Economy
- Department of Finance and Personnel was renamed Department of Finance
- Department of Health, Social Services and Public Safety was renamed Department of Health
- Department for Regional Development was renamed Department for Infrastructure
- Department for Social Development was renamed Department for Communities

The following departments were dissolved:

- Department of Culture, Arts and Leisure
- Department of the Environment
- Department for Employment and Learning

== Structure ==
In contrast with Westminster system cabinets, which generally need only be backed by a majority of legislators, ministerial positions in the Northern Ireland Executive are allocated to parties with significant representation in the Assembly. With the exception of justice, the number of ministries to which each party is entitled is determined by the D'Hondt system, based upon the number of seats in the Assembly which are held by members of each party (with ties broken based on first-preference votes cast in the general election for the Assembly).

In effect, major parties cannot be excluded from participation in government and power-sharing is enforced by the system. The form of government is therefore known as mandatory coalition as opposed to voluntary coalition where parties negotiate an agreement to share power. The Democratic Unionist Party (DUP), the Ulster Unionist Party (UUP), the Alliance Party of Northern Ireland and some Social Democratic and Labour Party (SDLP) members favour a move towards voluntary coalition in the longer term but this is currently opposed by Sinn Féin.

The executive cannot function if either of the two largest parties refuse to take part, as these parties are allocated the first minister and deputy first minister positions. However, other parties are not required to enter the executive even if they are entitled to do so; instead, they can choose to go into opposition if they wish. There were some calls for the SDLP and the UUP to enter opposition after the 2007 Assembly elections, but ultimately the two parties chose to take the seats in the Executive to which they were entitled.

In 2010, an exception to the D'Hondt system for allocating the number of ministerial portfolios was made under the Hillsborough Castle Agreement to allow the cross-community Alliance Party of Northern Ireland to hold the politically contentious policing and justice brief when most of those powers were devolved to the Assembly. Devolution took place on 12 April 2010.

Under D'Hondt, the SDLP would have been entitled to the extra ministerial seat on the revised Executive created by the devolution of policing and justice. Accordingly, both the UUP and SDLP protested that Alliance was not entitled, under the rules of the Good Friday Agreement, to fill the portfolio and refused to support this move. However, Alliance leader David Ford was elected Minister with the support of the DUP and Sinn Féin.

On 26 August 2015, the UUP announced it would withdraw from the Executive and form an opposition after all, in response to the assassination of Kevin McGuigan.

On 25 May 2016 a new executive was announced (three weeks after assembly election). For the first time in the assembly's history, parties that were entitled to ministries (i.e. UUP, SDLP and Alliance) chose instead to go into opposition following a recent bill providing parties with this choice. This meant that the executive was formed only by the two major parties, the DUP and Sinn Féin, and thus giving them more seats in the Executive (with the exception of the Department of Justice which was given to an Independent Unionist MLA, Claire Sugden, due to this appointment needing cross-community support).

== Procedure ==
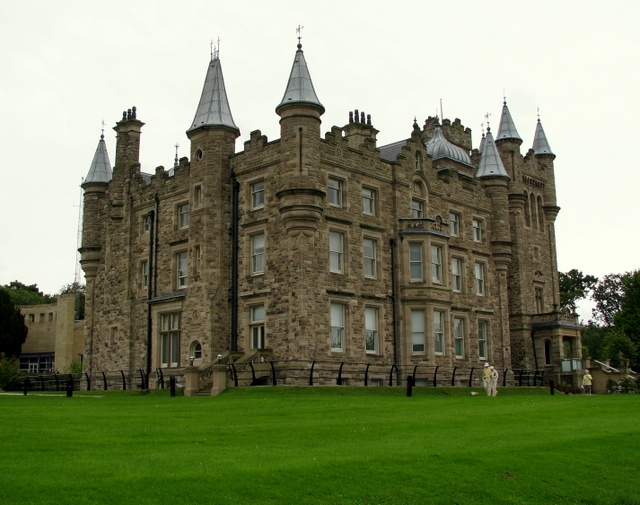
Stormont Castle, seat of the Executive

The Executive is co-chaired by the first minister and deputy first minister. Its official functions are:

- acting as a forum for the discussion of, and agreement on, issues which cut across the responsibilities of two or more ministers;
- prioritising executive and legislative proposals;
- discussing and agreeing upon significant or controversial matters; and
- recommending a common position where necessary (e.g. in dealing with external relationships).

Executive meetings are normally held fortnightly, compared to weekly meetings of the British Cabinet and Irish Government. Under the Executive's Ministerial Code, ministers are obliged to:

- operate within the framework of the Programme for Government;
- support all decisions of the Executive and Northern Ireland Assembly; and
- participate fully in the Executive, the North/South Ministerial Council and the British-Irish Council.

The Ministerial Code allows any three ministers to request a cross-community vote. The quorum for voting is seven ministers.

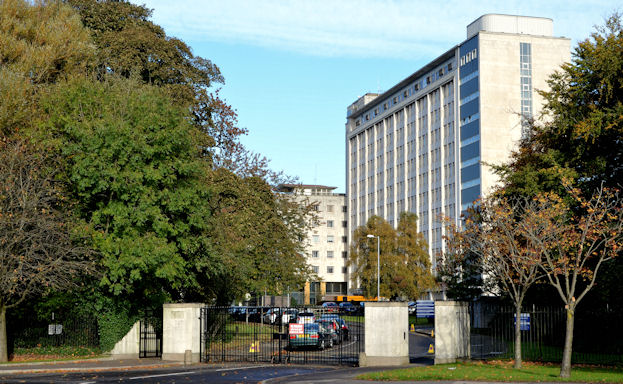
Dundonald House, previously home to various government agencies

The current system of devolution has succeeded long periods of direct rule (1974–1999 and 2002–2007), when the Northern Ireland Civil Service had a considerable influence on government policy. The legislation which established new departments in 1999 affirmed that "the functions of a department shall at all times be exercised subject to the direction and control of the Minister". Ministerial powers can be conferred by an Act of the Assembly and ministers can also exercise executive powers which are vested in the Crown.

Ministers are also subject to several limitations, including the European Convention on Human Rights, European Union law, other international obligations of the UK, a requirement not to discriminate on religious or political grounds, and having no power over reserved and excepted matters (which are held by the United Kingdom Government).

Ministerial decisions can be challenged by a petition of 30 Northern Ireland Assembly members. This action can be taken for alleged breaches of the Ministerial Code and on "matters of public importance". The Speaker of the Assembly must consult political party leaders in the Assembly (who are often also ministers) before deciding whether the subject is a matter of public importance. Successful petitions will then be considered by the Executive.

The number of ministers and their responsibilities can be changed when a department is being established or dissolved. The proposal must be made by the First Minister and the deputy First Minister and be carried by a cross-community vote in the Assembly. The number of departments was initially limited to 10 but this increased to 11 upon the devolution of justice.

Ministers are disqualified from holding office if appointed to the Government of Ireland or as the chairman or deputy chairman of an Oireachtas (Irish Parliament) committee.

== Strategies ==
The Good Friday Agreement states that the Executive will "seek to agree each year, and review as necessary" a Programme for Government incorporating an agreed budget.

The following programmes for government have been published to date:

- Draft Programme for Government (2001–2002) (25 October 2000)
- Draft Programme for Government (2002–2003) (24 September 2001)
- Programme for Government 2008–2011 (22 January 2008)
- Programme for Government 2011–2015 (12 March 2012)

The following budgets have been published to date:

- Budget 2008–11
- Budget 2011–15

Under the St Andrews Agreement, the Executive is obliged to adopt strategies on the following policy matters:

- enhancing and protecting the development of the Irish language;
- enhancing and developing Ulster Scots language, heritage and culture; and
- tackling poverty, social exclusion and patterns of deprivation based on objective need.

The Office of the First Minister and deputy First Minister published a child poverty strategy in March 2011. The wider anti-poverty strategy was carried over from direct rule in November 2006. As of November 2011, neither an Irish language strategy nor an Ulster Scots strategy had been adopted. The Department of Culture, Arts and Leisure states that a Strategy for Indigenous or Regional Minority Languages "will be presented to the Executive in due course".

== History ==
=== 1974 ===
The original Northern Ireland Executive was established on 1 January 1974, following the Sunningdale Agreement. It comprised a voluntary coalition between the Ulster Unionist Party, Social Democratic and Labour Party and Alliance Party of Northern Ireland, with the UUP's Brian Faulkner in the position of Chief Executive. It was short-lived, collapsing on 28 May 1974 due to the Ulster Workers' Council strike, and the Troubles continued in the absence of a political settlement.

=== Composition since devolution ===
Historical composition of the Northern Ireland Executive
Executive (Assembly)	Date	Event	Mandatory coalition: Executive Office		Cross-community appointment: Justice	D'Hondt method allocation					Vacant	Total Ministerial Offices
Executive (Assembly)	Date	Event	FM	dFM	Cross-community appointment: Justice						Vacant	Total Ministerial Offices
Executive (Assembly)	Date	Event	FM	dFM	Cross-community appointment: Justice	UUP (U)	SDLP (N)	DUP (U)	SF (N)	APNI (O)	Vacant	Total Ministerial Offices
1st E. (1st A.)	1 July 1998	formation	UUP	SDLP	-	3	3	2	2	0	0	10
1st E. (1st A.)	14 October 2002	dissolution	Vacant								10	10
2nd E. (3rd A.)	8 May 2007	formation	DUP	SF	-	2	1	4	3	0	0	10
2nd E. (3rd A.)	12 April 2010	devolution	DUP	SF	Alliance	2	1	4	3	0	0	11
2nd E. (3rd A.)	24 March 2011	dissolution	Vacant								11	11
3rd E. (4th A.)	16 May 2011	formation	DUP	SF	Alliance	1	1	4	3	1	0	11
3rd E. (4th A.)	1 September 2015	resignation	DUP	SF	Alliance	R	1	4	3	1	1	11
3rd E. (4th A.)	20 October 2015	reallocation	DUP	SF	Alliance	R	1	5	3	1	0	11
3rd E. (4th A.)	16 May 2016	dissolution	Vacant								11	11
4th E. (5th A.)	26 May 2016	formation	DUP	SF	Ind. (U)	R	R	4	3	0	0	8
4th E. (5th A.)	16 January 2017	dissolution	Vacant								8	8
5th E. (6th A.)	11 Jan 2020	formation	DUP	SF	Alliance	1	1	3	2	0	0	8
5th E. C (6th A.)	3 February 2022	collapse	Vacant		Alliance	1	1	3	2	0	0	8
5th E. C (6th A.)	28 March 2022	dissolution	Vacant		Alliance	1	1	3	2	0	0	8
5th E. C (7th A.)	16 May 2022	reallocation	Vacant		Alliance	1	R	3	3	0	0	8
5th E. C (7th A.)	27 October 2022	expiry	Vacant								8	8
6th E. (7th A.)	3 Feb 2024	formation	SF	DUP	Alliance	1	0	2	3	1	0	8
C = Caretaker ministers under the New Decade, New Approach agreement; FM, dFM = First and deputy First Minister, each assisted by a junior minister from their respective parties; R = resigned or refused posts entitled to under the D'Hondt method.

=== 1998–2002 ===
The current Executive was provided for in the Belfast Agreement, signed on 10 April 1998. Designates for First Minister and deputy First Minister were appointed on 1 July 1998 by the UUP and SDLP, respectively. A full Executive was nominated on 29 November 1999 and took office on 2 December 1999, comprising the UUP, SDLP, Democratic Unionist Party and Sinn Féin. Devolution was suspended for four periods, during which the departments came under the responsibility of direct rule ministers from the Northern Ireland Office:

- between 12 February 2000 and 30 May 2000;
- on 11 August 2001;
- on 22 September 2001;
- between 15 October 2002 and 8 May 2007.

The 2002–2007 suspension followed the refusal of the Ulster Unionist Party to share power with Sinn Féin after a high-profile Police Service of Northern Ireland investigation into an alleged Provisional Irish Republican Army spy ring.

=== 2007–2011 ===
The second Executive formed in 2007 was led by the DUP and Sinn Féin, with the UUP and SDLP also securing ministerial roles.

However, the Executive did not meet between 19 June 2008 and 20 November 2008 due to a boycott by Sinn Féin. This took place during a dispute between the DUP and Sinn Féin over the devolution of policing and justice powers. Policing and justice powers were devolved on 12 April 2010, with the new Minister of Justice won by Alliance in a cross-community vote.

=== 2011–2016 ===
Following the Northern Ireland Assembly election held on 5 May 2011, a third Executive was formed on 16 May 2011 with the same five parties represented. Alliance for the first time gained administration of a department under the D'Hondt system, in addition to the Department of Justice.

Peter Robinson of the DUP and Martin McGuinness of Sinn Féin were nominated by their parties and appointed as First Minister and deputy First Minister on 12 May 2011. Traditional Unionist Voice leader Jim Allister opposed the joint appointment. On 16 May 2011, 10 other Executive ministers (with the exception of the Minister of Justice) and two junior ministers were appointed by their political parties. The Minister of Justice was then elected by the Assembly via a cross-community vote.

On 26 August 2015, the UUP withdrew from the Executive in protest over the alleged involvement of members of the Provisional IRA in the murder of Kevin McGuigan Sr. Danny Kennedy MLA's position as Minister for Regional Development was later taken over by the DUP, thereby leaving four Northern Irish parties in the power sharing agreement. On 10 September 2015 Peter Robinson stepped down as First Minister, although he did not officially resign. Arlene Foster took over as acting First Minister. Robinson resumed his duties as First Minister again on 20 October 2015.

Following the signing of the Fresh Start Agreement, Peter Robinson announced his intention to stand down as leader of the DUP and First Minister of Northern Ireland. He subsequently resigned as DUP leader on 18 December 2015, being succeeded by Arlene Foster. Foster then took office as First Minister on 11 January 2016.

=== 2016–2017 ===
The fourth Executive was formed following the May 2016 election. The SDLP, UUP and Alliance Party left the Executive and formed the Official Opposition for the first time. Ministerial positions were proportionally allocated between the DUP and Sinn Féin, with independent unionist Claire Sugden serving as Minister of Justice. The government collapsed on 16 January 2017, after Martin McGuinness resigned in protest over the Renewable Heat Incentive scandal. His resignation sparked a snap election as Sinn Féin refused to re-nominate a deputy First Minister.

In 2018, Arlene Foster stated that the ongoing political deadlock was caused by Sinn Féin's insistence on an Irish Language Act that would grant legal status to the Irish language in Northern Ireland, which Foster's party refuses to allow.

==== Departments Act (Northern Ireland) 2016 ====
Departments Act (Northern Ireland) 2016
- Act of the Northern Ireland Assembly
- Northern Ireland Assembly
- Long title: An Act to rename the Office of the First Minister and deputy First Minister, the Department of Agriculture and Rural Development, the Department of Enterprise, Trade and Investment, the Department of Finance and Personnel, the Department of Health, Social Services and Public Safety, the Department for Regional Development and the Department for Social Development; to dissolve the Department of Culture, Arts and Leisure, the Department of the Environment and the Department for Employment and Learning; and for connected purposes.
- Citation: 2016 c. 5 (N.I.)
- Introduced by: Peter Robinson, First Minister; Martin McGuinness, deputy First Minister

Dates
- Royal assent: 29 February 2016
- Commencement: 8 May 2016
Other legislation
Amends	Department of Justice Act (Northern Ireland) 2010
Repeals/revokes	Department for Employment and Learning Act (Northern Ireland) 2001

Status: Current legislation

History of passage through the Assembly

Text of statute as originally enacted

Text of the Departments Act (Northern Ireland) 2016 as in force today (including any amendments) within the United Kingdom, from legislation.gov.uk.

The Departments Act (Northern Ireland) 2016 (c. 5 (N.I.)) is an act of the Northern Ireland Assembly which reorganised the functions of the departments of the Northern Ireland Executive.

The legislative basis for departments of the Northern Ireland Executive is set out in section 17 of the Northern Ireland Act 1998.

In 2007, the St Andrews Agreement contained a commitment to review if functions could be transferred from the Office of the First Minister and the deputy First Minister to other departments, but this was not substantively acted upon. The reduction of the number of departments was first suggested in 2009.

In 2012, Stephen Farry as Minister of Employment and Learning suggested that proposals to abolish his department were driven by the fact that he was an Alliance Party minister. Sammy Wilson, as Finance Minister, suggested that the number of departments could be reduced from 11 to 6, and this would save "tens of millions of pounds" per year.

In 2014, the Stormont House Agreement included a proposal for the number of departments to be reduced from 11 to 9.

In March 2015 Peter Robinson announced new arrangements for new departments.

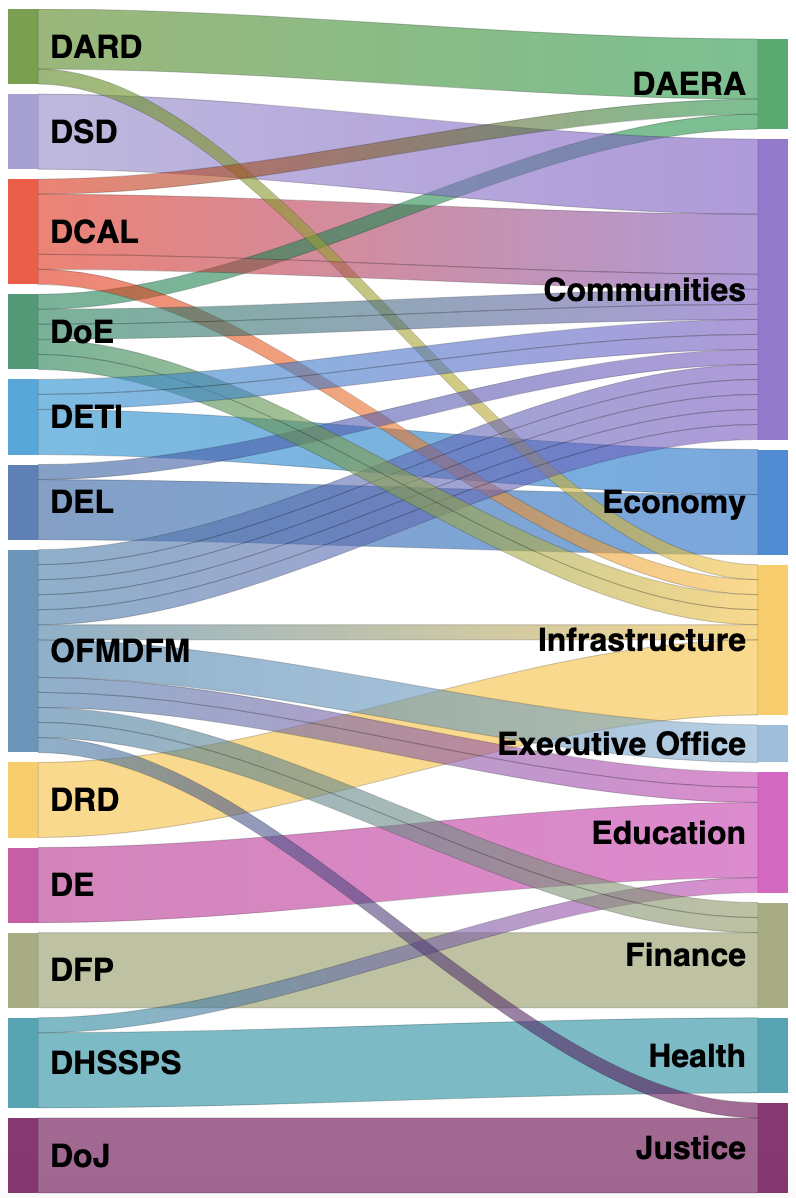

In November 2015, legislation was introduced to the assembly to reduce the number of departments from 12 to 9. In order to have the new structure in place before the 2016 Northern Ireland Assembly election, it was proceeded via an accelerated passage.

=== Northern Ireland (Executive Formation etc.) Act 2019 ===
The Northern Ireland (Executive Formation etc) Act 2019 was passed by the UK parliament on 10 July 2019 and became law on 24 July. The main purpose of the bill was to prevent another election and keep Northern Ireland services running in the absence of a functional devolved government. However, two Labour MPs, Conor McGinn and Stella Creasy, added amendments that would legalize same-sex marriage and liberalize abortion law (both devolved issues) if the DUP and Sinn Féin could not come to an agreement before 21 October.

=== Executive Committee (Functions) Act (Northern Ireland) 2020 ===
Executive Committee (Functions) Act (Northern Ireland) 2020
- Act of the Northern Ireland Assembly
- Northern Ireland Assembly
- Long title: An Act to make provision concerning the decisions which may be made by Ministers without recourse to the Executive Committee.
- Citation: 2020 c. 3 (N.I.)
- Introduced by: Arlene Foster, First Minister; Michelle O'Neill, deputy First Minister

Dates
- Royal assent: 25 August 2020
- Commencement: 26 August 2020
Other legislation
Amends	Northern Ireland Act 1998

Status: Current legislation

History of passage through the Assembly

Text of statute as originally enacted

Text of the Executive Committee (Functions) Act (Northern Ireland) 2020 as in force today (including any amendments) within the United Kingdom, from legislation.gov.uk.

The Executive Committee (Functions) Act (Northern Ireland) 2020 (c. 4 (N.I.)) gives executive ministers more autonomy in making decisions.

While the legislation was supported by the Democratic Unionist Party, several DUP backbenchers abstained on the bill at second stage. Two other DUP backbenchers did not attend the second stage debate on the bill. The bill was "fast-tracked" through the assembly. The leader of the Ulster Unionist Party, Doug Beattie, raised concerns that the legislation would lead to a more "combative" executive.

The legislation clarifies the powers of the Infrastructure Minister.

The legislation was described by Richard Bullick, a former DUP adviser, as "sleepwalking" into constitutional change. Executive ministers supported the legislation, because a 2018 court decision relating to a incinerator at Mallusk meant that every major planning decision would require going to the executive.

=== Functioning of Government (Miscellaneous Provisions) Act (Northern Ireland) 2021 ===
Functioning of Government (Miscellaneous Provisions) Act (Northern Ireland) 2021
- Act of the Northern Ireland Assembly
- Northern Ireland Assembly
- Long title: An Act to amend sections 7 and 8 of the Civil Service (Special Advisers) Act (Northern Ireland) 2013, repeal the Civil Service Commissioners (Amendment) (Northern Ireland) Order in Council 2007, repeal the Civil Service Commissioners (Amendment) Order (Northern Ireland) 2016, amend sections 17 and 27 of the Assembly Members (Independent Financial Review and Standards) Act (Northern Ireland) 2011 and to make additional provision for the functioning of government in Northern Ireland and connected purposes.
- Citation: 2021 c. 3 (N.I.)
- Introduced by: Jim Allister MLA

Dates
- Royal assent: 22 March 2021
Other legislation
Amends	Civil Service (Special Advisers) Act (Northern Ireland) 2013; Assembly Members (Independent Financial Review and Standards) Act (Northern Ireland) 2011

Status: Current legislation

History of passage through the Assembly

Text of statute as originally enacted

Text of the Functioning of Government (Miscellaneous Provisions) Act (Northern Ireland) 2021 as in force today (including any amendments) within the United Kingdom, from legislation.gov.uk.

The Functioning of Government (Miscellaneous Provisions) Act (Northern Ireland) 2021 (c. 3 (N.I.)) is an act of the Northern Ireland Assembly which:

- requires special advisers be subject to the same disciplinary procedure as the Northern Ireland Civil Service,
- restricts access to buildings, information and resources to official special advisers rather than unofficial special advisers,
- prohibits the two junior ministers in the Executive Office from being able to appoint special,
- makes ministers subject to the oversight of the Commissioner for Standards at the Northern Ireland Assembly
- introduces a criminal offence only applicable to special advisers and ministers of the communication of official information for the "improper benefit" of an individual
- civil servants must record all relevant meetings attended by ministers or special advisers
- ministers must record record any lobbying as defined the act and submit this in writing to their department

=== Reformation ===
On 11 January 2020, the Executive was re-formed with Arlene Foster as First Minister and Sinn Féin's Michelle O'Neill as deputy First Minister following the New Decade, New Approach agreement. All five parties joined the government; other ministers include Edwin Poots (DUP); Robin Swann (UUP), Nichola Mallon (SDLP), Gordon Lyons (DUP), and Declan Kearney (SF). Alliance Party leader Naomi Long was appointed justice minister. At the first session of the assembly, Foster stated that it was "time for Stormont to move forward". The new speaker of the Assembly was a member of Sinn Féin. The collapse of this Executive led to the 2022 Northern Ireland Assembly election.

On 3 February 2022, Paul Givan resigned as First Minister, which automatically resigned Michelle O'Neill as deputy first minister and collapsed the executive of Northern Ireland.

On 30 January 2024, leader of the DUP Jeffrey Donaldson announced that the DUP would restore an executive government on the condition that new legislation was passed by the UK House of Commons.

== Executive committee ==
Northern Ireland Executive
Portfolio	Minister	Party	Term
Executive Ministers
First Minister	Michelle O'Neill	Sinn Féin	2024–present
Deputy First Minister	Emma Little-Pengelly	DUP	2024–present
Agriculture, Environment and Rural Affairs	Andrew Muir	Alliance	2024–present
Communities	Gordon Lyons	DUP	2024–present
Economy	Caoimhe Archibald	Sinn Féin	2025–present
Education	Paul Givan	DUP	2024–present
Finance	John O'Dowd	Sinn Féin	2025–present
Health	Robbie Butler	UUP	2026–present
Infrastructure	Liz Kimmins	Sinn Féin	2025–present
Justice	Naomi Long	Alliance	2024–present
Also attending Executive meetings
Junior Minister (assisting the First Minister)	Aisling Reilly	Sinn Féin	2024–present
Junior Minister (assisting the deputy First Minister)	Pam Cameron	DUP	2024–present
=== Changes 8 May 2024 ===
Economy	Deirdre Hargey	Sinn Féin	2024 (interim)
=== Changes 28 May 2024 ===
Economy	Conor Murphy	Sinn Féin	2024–2025
Health	Mike Nesbitt	UUP	2024–2026
=== Changes 3 February 2025 ===
Economy	Caoimhe Archibald	Sinn Féin	2025–present
Finance	John O'Dowd	Sinn Féin	2025–present
Infrastructure	Liz Kimmins	Sinn Féin	2025–present
=== Changes 29 September 2025 ===
Junior Minister (assisting the deputy First Minister)	Joanne Bunting	DUP	2025–present
=== Changes 18 August 2026 ===
Health	Mike Nesbitt	UUP	2024–2026
=== Changes 20 August 2026 ===
Health	Robbie Butler	UUP	2026–present

On 8 May 2024, Conor Murphy stepped down as Minister for the Economy. First Minister Michelle O'Neill said that Deirdre Hargey will serve as an interim Minister for the Economy.

On 3 February 2025, Sinn Fein announced a reshuffle of their ministerial posts as a result of Conor Murphy's election to the Seanad Éireann, with John O'Dowd becoming Minister of Finance, Caoimhe Archibald serving as Minister for the Economy and Liz Kimmins becoming the Minister for Infrastructure.

Ministers are assisted by backbench "Assembly private secretaries" (equivalent to parliamentary private secretaries). The non-political Attorney General for Northern Ireland is the chief legal advisor to the Executive, appointed by the first minister and deputy first minister, and may also attend Executive meetings.

== See also ==
- Devolution in the United Kingdom
- Government spending in the United Kingdom
- Northern Ireland peace process
