= Northern Ireland Office =

Ministerial department of the UK Government

Department overview
- Formed: 24 March 1972
- Preceding Department: Dublin Castle administration (1171–1921) Home Office (1921–1972) Office of the Prime Minister (1921–1972) Office of the Governor (1922–1973)
- Jurisdiction: Government of the United Kingdom
- Headquarters: Northern Ireland; Erskine House, Belfast; Westminster; 1 Horse Guards Road, London
- Employees: 167 (September 2011)
- Annual budget: £23 million for 2011–12
- Secretary of State responsible: Chris Bryant MP, Secretary of State for Northern Ireland
- Department executives: Julie Harrison, Permanent Secretary; Holly Clark, Chief Operating Officer
- Website: gov.uk/nio

The Northern Ireland Office (NIO; Irish: Oifig Thuaisceart Éireann, Ulster-Scots: Norlin Airlann Oaffis) is a ministerial department of the Government of the United Kingdom. It is responsible for handling Northern Ireland affairs. The NIO is led by the Secretary of State for Northern Ireland and is based at Erskine House in Belfast City Centre and 1 Horse Guards Road in London.

== Responsibilities ==
The NIO's role is to "maintain and support" the devolution settlement resulting from the Good Friday Agreement and St Andrews Agreement and the devolution of criminal justice and policing to the Northern Ireland Assembly. The department has responsibility for:

- electoral law
- human rights and equality
- national security in Northern Ireland
- the UK Government's approach to the legacy of the Troubles

It also represents Northern Irish interests at UK Government level and the interests of the UK Government in Northern Ireland.

The Northern Ireland Office has a close working relationship with the Government of Ireland as a co-guarantor of the peace process; this includes the British-Irish Intergovernmental Conference and its joint secretariat.

In the Irish Government, the NIO's main counterparts are:

- the Department of Foreign Affairs (on the peace process);
- the Department of the Taoiseach (supporting the role of the Taoiseach in the peace process);
- the Department of Justice, Home Affairs and Migration (on national security matters and the legacy of the Troubles);
- the Department of Housing, Local Government and Heritage (on electoral law).

== History ==
After partition in 1924 the Dublin Castle administration was largely replaced by the Parliament of Northern Ireland with the Northern Ireland Department of the Home Office handling the oversight from London, with some extremely important decisions such as sending of British Army soldiers to Northern Ireland in 1969 being made by the Home Secretary. In March 1972 with the Troubles worsening and the UK Government losing confidence in the Northern Ireland Government, direct rule from Westminster was introduced.

The formation of the NIO put Northern Ireland on the same level as Scotland and Wales, where the Scottish Office and Welsh Office were established in 1885 and 1965 respectively. The NIO assumed policing and justice powers from the Ministry of Home Affairs. NIO junior ministers were placed in charge of other Northern Ireland Civil Service departments.

Direct rule was seen as a temporary measure, with a power-sharing devolution preferred as the solution. Under the Northern Ireland (Temporary Provisions) Act 1972, the Secretary of State for Northern Ireland replaced the Governor of Northern Ireland and direct rule was annually renewed by a vote in Parliament.

The Sunningdale Agreement in 1973 resulted in a brief, power-sharing Northern Ireland Executive, which was ended by the Ulster Workers' Council strike on 28 May 1974. The Northern Ireland Constitutional Convention (1975–1976) and Northern Ireland Assembly (1982–1986) were unsuccessful in restoring devolved government. After the Anglo-Irish Agreement on 15 November 1985, the UK Government and Irish Government co-operated more closely on security and political matters.

Following the Good Friday Agreement on 10 April 1998, devolution returned to Northern Ireland on 2 December 1999. The Northern Ireland Executive was suspended on 15 October 2002 and direct rule returned until devolution was restored on 8 May 2007.

The devolution of policing and justice powers on 12 April 2010 transferred many of the NIO's previous responsibilities to the Northern Ireland Assembly and its devolved government, the Northern Ireland Executive. The Department of Justice is now responsible for those matters. This transfer of power resulted in a smaller Northern Ireland Office, comparable to the Scotland Office and Wales Office.

== Ministers ==
The NIO ministers are as follows, with cabinet members in bold:

| Minister | Portrait | Office | Portfolio |
|---|---|---|---|
| **Chris Bryant** MP | | Secretary of State for Northern Ireland | Overall responsibility; Political stability and relations with the Northern Ireland Executive; National security and counter-terrorism; Implementation of the Stormont House and Fresh Start Agreements, including legacy of the past; Representing Northern Ireland in the Cabinet on EU exit, including new economic opportunities; International interest in Northern Ireland, including relations with the Irish government. |
| Vacant | | Minister of State for Northern Ireland | |
| Sarah Owen MP | | Parliamentary Under-Secretary of State for Northern Ireland | Public service transformation, investment and economic growth, working with the NI Executive; Supporting regular & sustained engagement with NI parties and Whitehall stakeholders; Supporting the progress of the department’s business in the House of Commons; and Social inclusion. |
| Baroness Anderson of Stoke-on-Trent | | Parliamentary Under-Secretary of State for Northern Ireland | Supporting regular & sustained engagement with Members of the House of Lords; The department’s business in the House of Lords; Part 4 of the Legacy Act 2023; Providing support on constitutional matters relating to NI; Community cohesion; and Preparations for the 30th anniversary of the Belfast (Good Friday) Agreement. |

As Attorney General for England and Wales, Ellie Reeves is Advocate General for Northern Ireland, advising the UK Government on Northern Ireland law.

=== Secretaries of State for Northern Ireland ===
The department is led by the Secretary of State for Northern Ireland.

=== Permanent Secretary ===
The senior civil servant in the NIO is Julie Harrison, who was appointed in September 2023.

== See also ==
- Northern Ireland Affairs Committee
- Northern Ireland Assembly
- Northern Ireland Executive
- Department of Justice
