= Direct rule (Northern Ireland) =

Periods of direct administration of Northern Ireland by the government of the UK

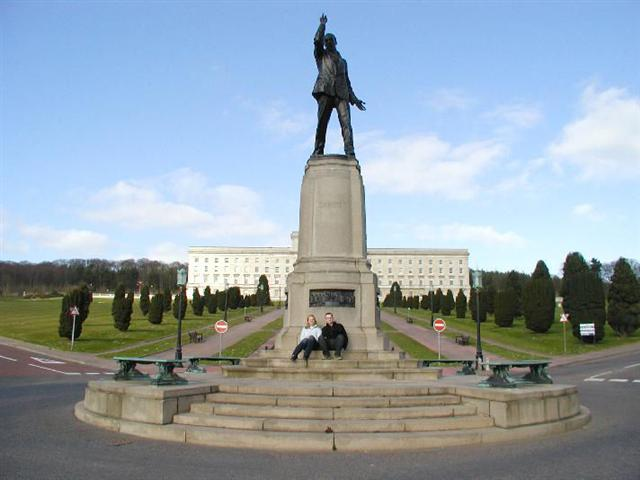
Stormont, Belfast

In Northern Irish politics, direct rule (Irish: riail dhíreach) is the administration of Northern Ireland directly by the Government of the United Kingdom. It was practised for 26 consecutive years between 1972 and 1998 during the Troubles, and has since then been temporarily applied during suspensions. The most recent period of direct rule came to an end on 8 May 2007 when power was restored to the Northern Ireland Assembly following elections in April and a power-sharing agreement among major parties.

Although everyday matters under direct rule were handled by government departments within Northern Ireland itself, major policy was determined by the British Government's Northern Ireland Office, under the direction of the Secretary of State for Northern Ireland; and legislation was introduced, amended, or repealed by means of Order in Council. Direct rule did not mean that the people of Northern Ireland had no democratic say in how they were governed; like other parts of the United Kingdom, they elected (and still elect) members of parliament to the Parliament of the United Kingdom, to which the Northern Ireland Office is responsible. But it did result in the existence of an administration specific to Northern Ireland which did not have a specifically Northern Irish mandate.

== History ==
The system of direct rule was originally introduced on 28 March 1972 under the terms of the UK's Northern Ireland (Temporary Provisions) Act 1972, which also suspended the Parliament of Northern Ireland ("Stormont").

The Northern Irish administration under Brian Faulkner had refused to allow control of security in the province to be transferred to London. As a consequence, the British government under Edward Heath announced on 24 March 1972 that devolved government in Northern Ireland would be suspended.

Responsibility for Northern Ireland within the Cabinet had until then rested with the home secretary, but was now transferred to the new post of Secretary of State for Northern Ireland, heading the Northern Ireland Office. Several new junior government ministers were created to politically head the NI government departments.

The British Government sought to establish a Northern Ireland Assembly in 1973 (under the Sunningdale Agreement; this was brought down by Unionist action), in 1982 (this time boycotted by Nationalists), and more recently under the terms of the Good Friday Agreement of 1998. Each time, the intention in principle was that the Assembly would take over the political governance of Northern Ireland, and that direct rule would thus come to an end. The results of the Good Friday Agreement were the most successful at achieving this; however, the Assembly was nevertheless suspended (and direct rule re-imposed) for over three months starting in February 2000, twice briefly in August and September of 2001, and again from October 2002 until the spring of 2007.

Since the St Andrews Agreement in 2006, Westminster no longer has the power to suspend the Assembly without the enactment of further primary legislation.

=== Instances of direct rule following the Good Friday Agreement ===
Northern Ireland Act 2000
- Act of Parliament
- Parliament of the United Kingdom
- Long title: An Act to make provision for the suspension of devolved government in Northern Ireland and the exercise of certain functions conferred by or under Part V of the Northern Ireland Act 1998; and for connected purposes.
- Citation: 2000 c. 1
- Introduced by: Peter Mandelson MP, Secretary of State for Northern Ireland (Commons); Lord Falconer of Thoroton (Lords)

Dates
- Royal assent: 10 February 2000
- Commencement: 12 February 2000
- Repealed: 10 May 2007

Other legislation
- Repealed by: Northern Ireland (St Andrews Agreement) Act 2006
- Relates to: Northern Ireland Act 1998

Status: Repealed

Text of statute as originally enacted

The assembly has been suspended five times since the signing of the Good Friday Agreement in accordance with the Northern Ireland Act 2000 (c. 1). The periods of suspension were:

- 11 February – 30 May 2000
- 10 August 2001 (24-hour suspension)
- 22 September 2001 (24-hour suspension)
- 14 October 2002 – 7 May 2007
