= Literature of Northern Ireland =

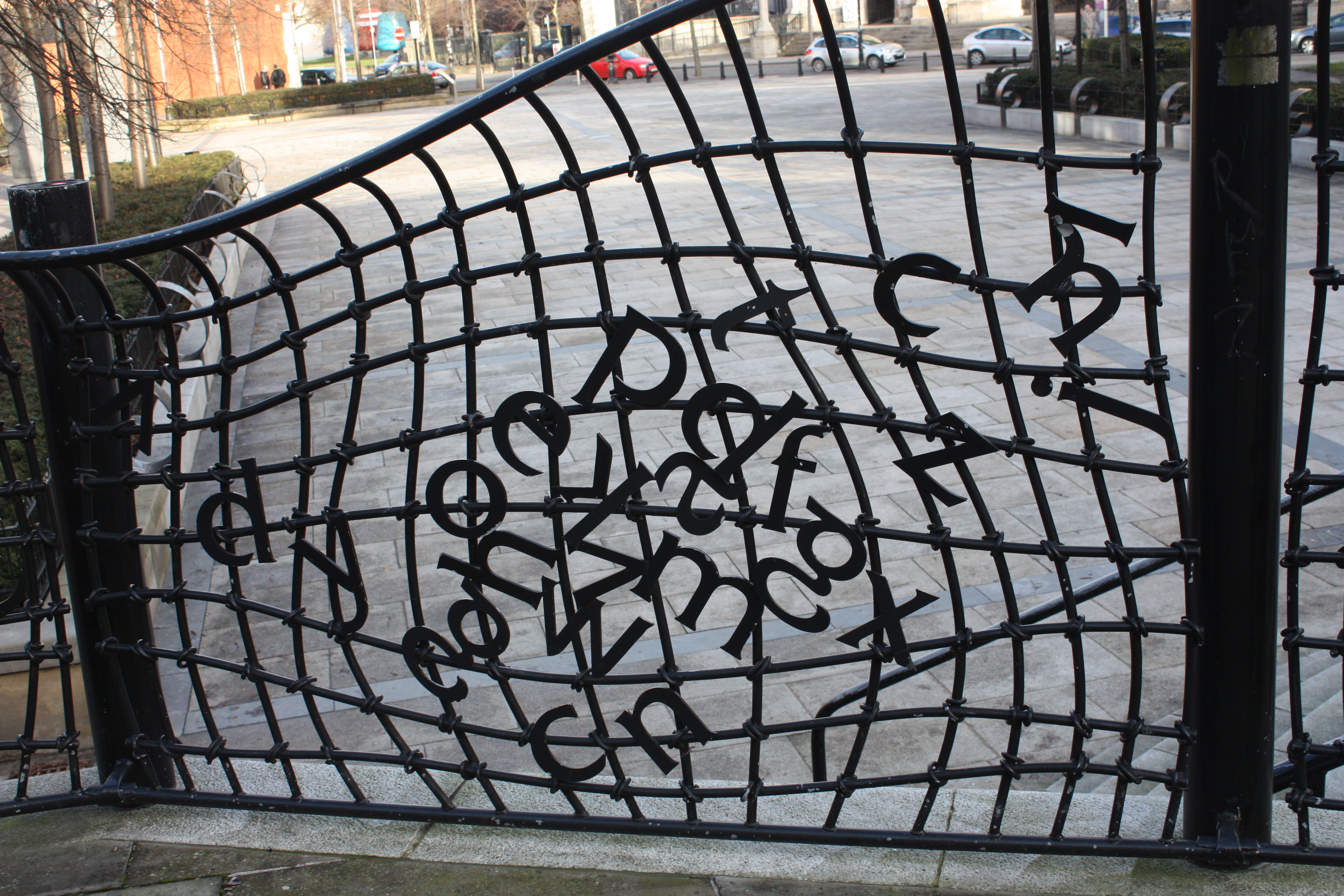
Artworks in Writers' Square, Belfast, celebrate the literary traditions of Northern Ireland

Literature of Northern Ireland includes literature written in Northern Ireland, and in that part of Ireland prior to 1922, as well as literature written by writers born in Northern Ireland who emigrated. It includes literature in English, Irish and Ulster Scots.

The impact of Irish nationalism that led to the partition of the island of Ireland in 1921 means that literature of the Republic of Ireland is not considered to be British – although the identity of literature from Northern Ireland, as part of the literature of the United Kingdom, may fall within the overlapping identities of Irish and British literature where "the naming of the territory has always been, in literary, geographical or historical contexts, a politically charged activity". Writing from Northern Ireland has been described as existing in a "double post-colonial condition" being viewed as not British enough, not Irish enough, and (for writings in Scots) not Scottish enough to be included in consideration within the various national canons.

This part of the United Kingdom, called Northern Ireland, was created in 1922, following the partition of the island of Ireland. The majority of the population of Northern Ireland wanted to remain within the United Kingdom (see unionism and loyalism). Most of these were the Protestant descendants of settlers from Great Britain.

The identity of literature of Northern Ireland is as contested as the identity of Northern Ireland itself, but Northern Ireland writers have contributed to Irish, British and other literatures as well as reflecting the changing character of Northern Ireland society. As Tom Paulin put it, it should be possible "to found a national literature on this scutching vernacular".

== Literature of this part of Ireland before 1922 ==
Irish language literature was the predominant literature in the pre-Plantation period. The Ulster Cycle is pertinent to the history of literature in the territory of present-day Northern Ireland. Ulster Scots literature first followed models from Scotland, with the rhyming weavers, such as James Orr, developing an indigenous tradition of vernacular literature. Writers in the counties which now form Northern Ireland participated in the Gaelic Revival.

=== Literature in English ===
Though the books of Forrest Reid (1875–1947) are not well known today, he has been labelled 'the first Ulster novelist of European stature', and comparisons have been drawn between his own coming of age novel of Protestant Belfast, Following Darkness (1912), and James Joyce's seminal novel of growing up in Catholic Dublin, A Portrait of the Artist as a Young Man (1916). Reid's fiction, which often uses submerged narratives to explore male beauty and love, can be placed within the historical context of the emergence of a more explicit expression of homosexuality in English literature in the 20th century.

=== Literature in Irish ===
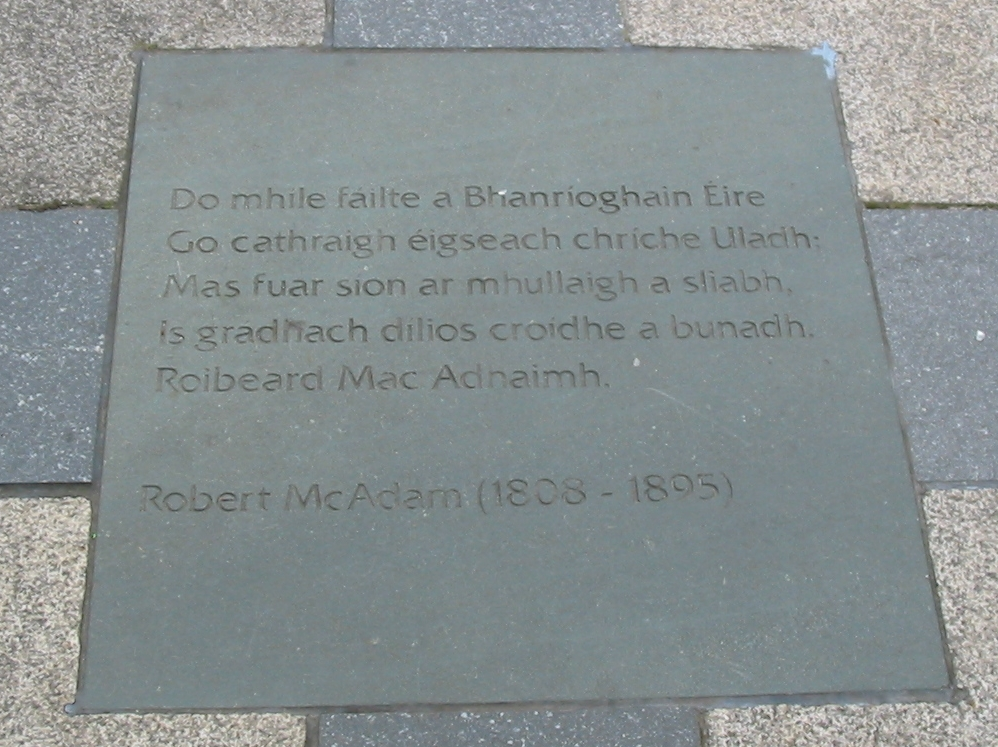
Poetry in Irish by Robert McAdam (1808–1895) in paving, Writers' Square, Belfast

"The Blackbird of Belfast Lough", a fragment of syllabic verse probably dating from the 9th century, has inspired reinterpretations and translations in modern times. The blackbird serves as symbol for the Seamus Heaney Centre for Poetry at Queen's University, Belfast.

The Annals of Ulster (Irish: Annála Uladh) cover years from AD 431 to AD 1540 and were compiled in the territory of what is now Northern Ireland: entries up to AD 1489 were compiled in the late 15th century by the scribe Ruaidhrí Ó Luinín, under his patron Cathal Óg Mac Maghnusa on the island of Belle Isle on Lough Erne.

The Ulster Cycle written in the 12th century, is a body of medieval Irish heroic legends and sagas of the traditional heroes of the Ulaid in what is now eastern Ulster and northern Leinster, particularly counties Armagh, Down and Louth. The stories are written in Old and Middle Irish, mostly in prose, interspersed with occasional verse passages. The language of the earliest stories is dateable to the 8th century, and events and characters are referred to in poems dating to the 7th.

=== Literature in Latin ===
The Book of Armagh is a 9th-century illuminated manuscript written mainly in Latin, containing early texts relating to Saint Patrick and some of the oldest surviving specimens of Old Irish. It is one of the earliest manuscripts produced by an insular church to contain a near complete copy of the New Testament. The manuscript was the work of a scribe named Ferdomnach of Armagh (died 845 or 846). Ferdomnach wrote the first part of the book in 807 or 808, for Patrick's heir (comarba) Torbach. It was one of the symbols of the office for the Archbishop of Armagh. The custodianship of the book was an important office that eventually became hereditary in the MacMoyre family. It remained in the hands of the MacMoyre family in the townland of Ballymoyer near Whitecross, County Armagh until the late 17th century. Its last hereditary keeper was Florence MacMoyer. By 1707 it was in the possession of the Brownlow family of Lurgan. It remained in the Brownlow family until 1853 when it was sold to the Irish antiquary, Dr William Reeves. In 1853, Reeves sold the Book to John George de la Poer Beresford, Archbishop of Armagh, who presented it to Trinity College Dublin,

=== Literature in Ulster Scots ===
Scots, mainly Gaelic-speaking, had been settling in Ulster since the 15th century, but large numbers of Scots-speaking Lowlanders, some 200,000, arrived during the 17th century following the 1610 Plantation, with the peak reached during the 1690s. In the core areas of Scots settlement, Scots outnumbered English settlers by five or six to one.

Literature from shortly before the end of the unselfconscious tradition at the turn of the 19th and 20th centuries is almost identical with contemporary writing from Scotland. W G Lyttle, writing in Paddy McQuillan's Trip Tae Glesco, uses the typically Scots forms kent and begood, now replaced in Ulster by the more mainstream Anglic forms knew, knowed or knawed and begun. Many of the modest contemporary differences between Scots as spoken in Scotland and Ulster may be due to dialect levelling and influence from Mid Ulster English brought about through relatively recent demographic change rather than direct contact with Irish, retention of older features or separate development.

The earliest identified writing in Scots in Ulster dates from 1571: a letter from Agnes Campbell of County Tyrone to Elizabeth I on behalf of Turlough O'Neil, her husband. Although documents dating from the Plantation period show conservative Scots features, English forms started to predominate from the 1620s as Scots declined as a written medium.

In Ulster Scots-speaking areas there was traditionally a considerable demand for the work of Scottish poets, often in locally printed editions. Alexander Montgomerie's The Cherrie and the Slae in 1700, shortly over a decade later an edition of poems by Sir David Lindsay, nine printings of Allan Ramsay's The Gentle shepherd between 1743 and 1793, and an edition of Robert Burns' poetry in 1787, the same year as the Edinburgh edition, followed by reprints in 1789, 1793 and 1800. Among other Scottish poets published in Ulster were James Hogg and Robert Tannahill.

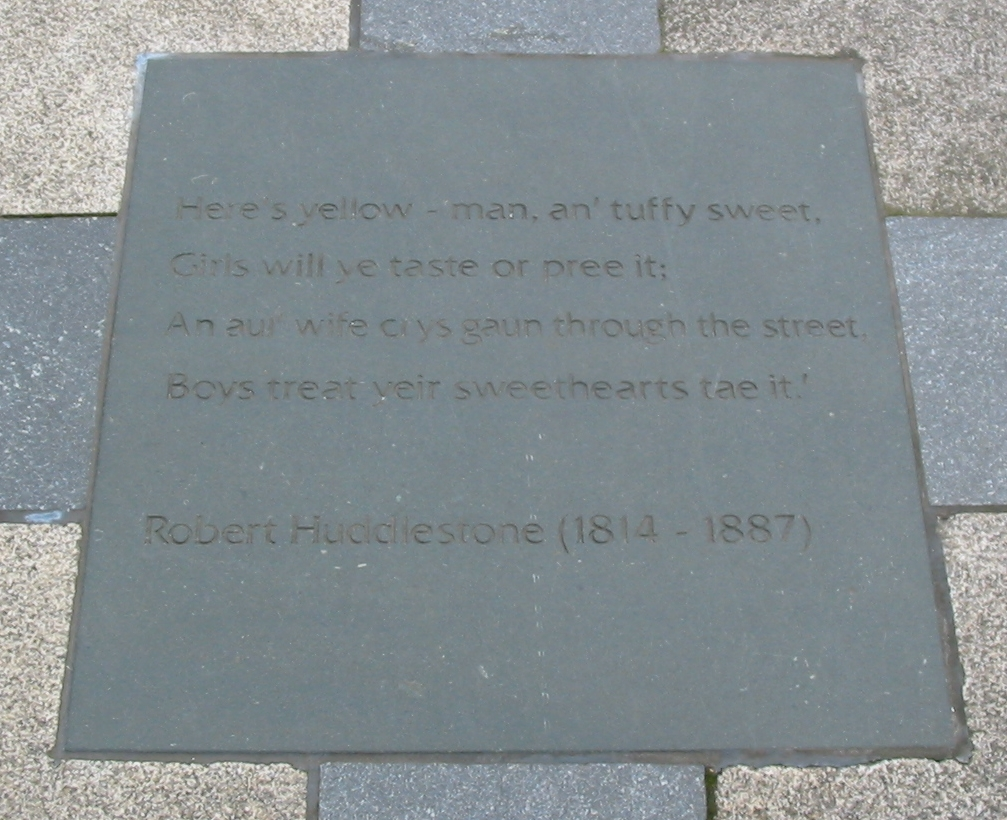
Poetry in Ulster Scots by Robert Huddlestone (1814–1887) inscribed in paving in Writers' Square, Belfast

That was complemented by a poetry revival and nascent prose genre in Ulster, which started around 1720. The most prominent being the 'rhyming weaver' poetry, of which, some 60 to 70 volumes were published between 1750 and 1850, the peak being in the decades 1810 to 1840, although the first printed poetry (in the Habbie stanza form) by an Ulster Scots writer was published in a broadsheet in Strabane in 1735. These weaver poets looked to Scotland for their cultural and literary models and were not simple imitators but clearly inheritors of the same literary tradition following the same poetic and orthographic practices; it is not always immediately possible to distinguish traditional Scots writing from Scotland and Ulster. Among the rhyming weavers were James Campbell (1758–1818), James Orr (1770–1816), Thomas Beggs (1749–1847), David Herbison (1800–1880), Hugh Porter (1780–1839) and Andrew McKenzie (1780–1839).

Scots was also used in the narrative by novelists such as W. G. Lyttle (1844–1896) and Archibald McIlroy (1860–1915). By the middle of the 19th century, the Kailyard school of prose had become the dominant literary genre, overtaking poetry. This was a tradition shared with Scotland which continued into the early 20th century. Scots also regularly appeared in newspaper columns, especially in Antrim and Down, in the form of pseudonymous social commentary employing a folksy first-person style. The pseudonymous Bab M'Keen (probably successive members of the Weir family: John Weir, William Weir, and Jack Weir) provided comic commentaries in the Ballymena Observer and County Antrim Advertiser for over a hundred years from the 1880s.

A somewhat diminished tradition of vernacular poetry survived into the 20th century in the work of poets such as Adam Lynn, author of the 1911 collection Random Rhymes frae Cullybackey, John Stevenson (died 1932), writing as "Pat M'Carty".

== From 1922: Literature of Northern Ireland ==
The year 1922 marked a significant change in the relationship between Britain and Ireland, with the setting up of the Irish Free State in the predominantly Catholic South, while the predominantly Protestant Northern Ireland remained part of the United Kingdom. The outbreak of The Troubles in the 1960s provided a theme for writers; some were engaged in the social and political background, others reacted against the tensions by looking at nature.

=== Literature in English ===
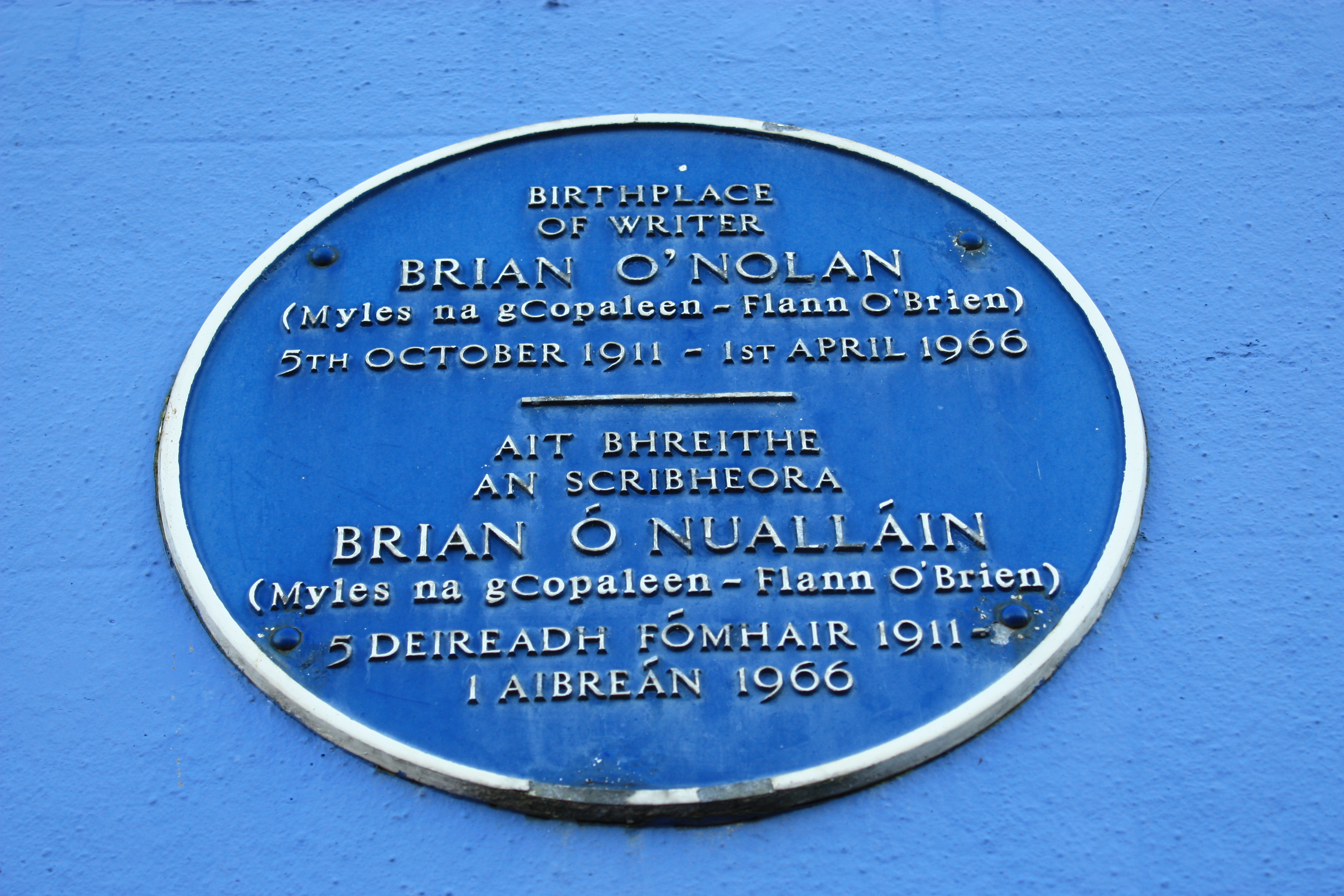
Blue plaque for Brian O'Nolan

Helen Waddell is best known for bringing to light the history of the medieval goliards in her 1927 book The Wandering Scholars, and translating their Latin poetry in the companion volume Medieval Latin Lyrics. A second anthology, More Latin Lyrics, was compiled in the 1940s but not published until after her death. She also wrote plays. Her first play was The Spoiled Buddha, which was performed at the Opera House, Belfast, by the Ulster Literary Society. Her The Abbé Prévost was staged in 1935. Her historical novel Peter Abelard was published in 1933. It was critically well received and became a bestseller.

Brian Moore ( 25 August 1921 – 11 January 1999) was a novelist and screenwriter from Northern Ireland who emigrated to Canada and later lived in the United States. He was acclaimed for the descriptions in his novels of life in Northern Ireland after the Second World War, in particular his explorations of the inter-communal divisions of The Troubles. He was awarded the James Tait Black Memorial Prize in 1975 and the inaugural Sunday Express Book of the Year award in 1987, and he was shortlisted for the Booker Prize three times (in 1976, 1987 and 1990). His Belfast-set novel Judith Hearne, remains among his most highly regarded.

Cal is a 1983 novel by Bernard MacLaverty, detailing the experiences of a young Irish Catholic involved with the IRA.

Ripley Bogle is the debut novel of Robert McLiam Wilson, published in 1989 in the UK. Written when he was 26 it is arguably his most acclaimed, winning the Rooney Prize and the Hughes Prize in 1989, and a Betty Trask Award and the Irish Book Awards the following year.

The Miracle Shed is a 1995 collection of short stories by Philip MacCann, published to great critical acclaim and winning the Rooney Prize in 1995. One story, Grey Area, describes total disassociation and bitter cynicism of teenaged Irish Catholics living in Belfast in the early 1980s at the time of the hunger strikes towards the Northern Ireland Troubles and the armed struggle of the IRA. In many ways it is a study of the semiology of propaganda and the politics of colour.

Colin Bateman's Dan Starkey novels are mostly set in Northern Ireland.

Anna Burns' third novel Milkman, won the Man Booker Prize in 2018.

Poetry in English 1922–45

John Hewitt (1907–1987), whom many consider to be the founding father of Northern Irish poetry, also came from a rural background but lived in Belfast and was amongst the first Irish poets to write of the sense of alienation that many at this time felt from both their original rural and new urban homes.

Louis MacNeice (1907–1963) was associated with the left-wing politics of Michael Roberts's anthology New Signatures. MacNeice's poetry was informed by his immediate interests and surroundings and is more social than political. As an urban Northerner, MacNeice could not idealize his native landscape as did John Hewitt, and with his Belfast Anglican background could not sympathize with a romantic view of Catholic Ireland. He felt estranged from Presbyterian Northern Ireland with its "voodoo of the Orange bands", but felt caught between British and Irish identities.

Richard Rowley's early poems, in The City of Refuge (1917), were rhetorical celebrations of industry. His next volume, City Songs and Others (1918), included his most quoted poem The Islandmen, and is regarded as containing his most original work: Browning-like monologues straight from the mouths of Belfast's working-class.

Poetry in English after World War II

Robert Greacen (1920–2008), along with Valentin Iremonger, edited an important anthology, Contemporary Irish Poetry in 1949. Greacen was born in Derry, lived in Belfast in his youth and then in London during the 1950s, 60s and 70s. He won the Irish Times Prize for Poetry in 1995 for his Collected Poems, after he returned to live in Dublin when he was elected a member of Aosdana. Other poets of note from this time include Roy McFadden (1921–1999), a friend for many years of Greacen. Another Northern poet of note is Padraic Fiacc (1924– ), who was born in Belfast, but lived in America during his youth.

In the 1960s, and coincident with the rise of the Troubles in the province, a number of poets began to receive critical and public notice. Prominent amongst these were John Montague (born 1929), Michael Longley (born 1939), Derek Mahon (born 1941), Seamus Heaney (born 1939), and Paul Muldoon (born 1951). Some critics find that these poets share some formal traits (including an interest in traditional poetic forms) as well as a willingness to engage with the difficult political situation in Northern Ireland. Others (such as the Dublin poet Thomas Kinsella) have found the whole idea of a Northern school to be more hype than reality, though this view is not widely held.

The Belfast Group was a poets' workshop which was organized by Philip Hobsbaum when he moved to Belfast in October 1963 to lecture in English at Queen's University. Seamus Heaney attended group meetings from the start. Heaney has said that the group "ratified the idea of writing". Michael Longley started attending after his return to Belfast in 1964. He has said that the group gave "an air of seriousness and electricity to the notion of writing", and that he was "surprised by the ferocity of Hobsbaum's attack". Other participants over the years included: James Simmons, Paul Muldoon, Ciarán Carson, Stewart Parker, Bernard MacLaverty, Frank Ormsby and the critics Edna Longley and Michael Allen. Louis Muinzer, the translator and theatre director was also a member of the group. In 1965 and 1966, the Belfast Festival at Queen's published pamphlets by some of the members of the group, including Heaney, Longley, and this attracted a certain amount of publicity. After Hobsbaum's departure for Glasgow in 1966, the Group lapsed for a while, but then was reconstituted in 1968 by Michael Allen, Arthur Terry, and Heaney. Meetings were held at Seamus and Marie Heaney's house on Ashley Avenue. May 1968 saw the first issue of The Honest Ulsterman, edited by James Simmons. The Belfast Group ceased to exist in 1972.

Heaney is probably the best-known of these poets. He won the Nobel Prize in Literature in 1995, and has served as Boylston Professor of Rhetoric and Oratory and Emerson Poet in Residence at Harvard, and as Professor of Poetry at Oxford. Seamus Heaney in his verse translation of Beowulf (2000) uses words from his Ulster speech A Catholic from Northern Ireland, Heaney, however, rejected his British identity and lived in the Republic of Ireland for much of his later life until his death in 2013.

Derek Mahon was born in Belfast and worked as a journalist, editor, and screenwriter while publishing his first books. His slim output should not obscure the high quality of his work, which is influenced by modernist writers such as Samuel Beckett.

Paul Muldoon was Howard G. B. Clark '21 Professor in the Humanities at Princeton University. In 1999 he was also elected Professor of Poetry at the University of Oxford.

Belfast Confetti is a poem about the aftermath of an IRA bomb by Ciarán Carson. The poem won the Irish Times' Irish Literature Prize for Poetry.

=== Literature in Irish ===
Gearóid Mac Lochlainn, a Belfast-based poet who learned Irish in school, has produced several poetry collections in Irish, including Sruth Teangacha/Stream of Tongues, which included translations by a number of prominent poets both in Irish and English, including Ciaran Carson, Medbh McGuckian, and Rita Kelly.

=== Literature in Ulster Scots ===
A somewhat diminished tradition of vernacular poetry survived into the 20th century in the work John Clifford (1900–1983) from East Antrim.

A prolific writer and poet, W. F. Marshall (8 May 1888 – January 1959) was known as "The Bard of Tyrone", Marshall composed poems such as Hi Uncle Sam, Me an' me Da (subtitled Livin' in Drumlister), Sarah Ann and Our Son. He was a leading authority on Mid Ulster English (the predominant dialect of Ulster).

In the late 20th century the Ulster Scots poetic tradition was revived, albeit often replacing the traditional Modern Scots orthographic practice with a series of contradictory idiolects. James Fenton's poetry, at times lively, contented, wistful, is written in contemporary Ulster Scots, mostly using a blank verse form, but also occasionally the Habbie stanza. He employs an orthography that presents the reader with the difficult combination of eye dialect, dense Scots, and a greater variety of verse forms than employed hitherto.

Philip Robinson's (born 1946) writing has been described as verging on "post-modern kailyard". He has produced a trilogy of novels Wake the Tribe o Dan (1998), The Back Streets o the Claw (2000) and The Man frae the Ministry (2005), as well as story books for children Esther, Quaen o tha Ulidian Pechts and Fergus an tha Stane o Destinie, and two volumes of poetry Alang the Shore (2005) and Oul Licht, New Licht (2009).

The polarising effects of the politics of the use of English and Irish language traditions limited academic and public interest until the studies of John Hewitt from the 1950s onwards. Further impetus was given by more generalised exploration of non-"Irish" and non-"English" cultural identities in the latter decades of the 20th century.

Michael Longley has experimented with Ulster Scots for the translation of Classical verse, as in his 1995 collection The Ghost Orchid. Longley has spoken of his identity as a Northern Irish poet: "some of the time I feel British and some of the time I feel Irish. But most of the time I feel neither and the marvellous thing about the Good Friday agreement was that it allowed me to feel more of each if I wanted to." He was awarded the Queen's Gold Medal for Poetry in 2001.

A team in Belfast has begun translating portions of the Bible into Ulster Scots. The Gospel of Luke was published in 2009 by The Ullans Press.

Regarding prose-writing, many stories and novels follow the kailyard style. This is when the story is told in English but the dialogue is written in Ulster Scots.

== Writers from Northern Ireland ==
- Anna Burns
- Ciarán Carson
- Mairtín Crawford
- Brian Friel
- Seamus Heaney
- John Hewitt
- C. S. Lewis
- Philip MacCann
- Bernard MacLaverty
- Louis MacNeice
- Ian McDonald
- Medbh McGuckian
- Derek Mahon
- Paul Muldoon
- Flann O'Brien
- Frank Ormsby
- Tom Paulin
- Richard Rowley
- Bob Shaw

=== Writers of Belfast ===
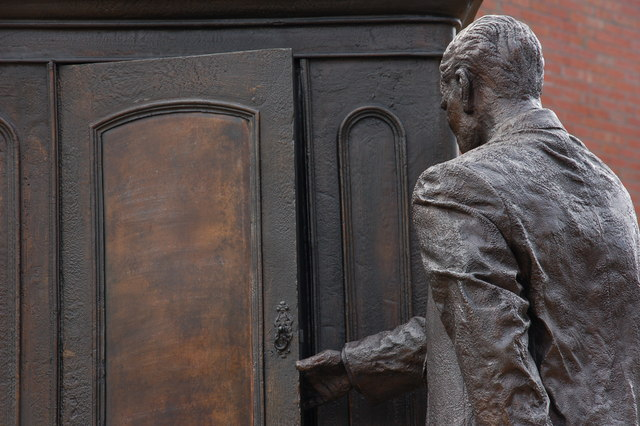
A sculpture in Belfast commemorating C. S. Lewis

Belfast has been home to a number of significant, novelists, poets and playwrights, besides the Belfast Group. C. S. Lewis, author of The Chronicles of Narnia, was born in Belfast as were Anna Burns, Brian Moore, Bernard MacLaverty, Glenn Patterson and Robert McLiam Wilson. Poet Louis MacNeice was born in the city. Contemporary poets writing in and about Belfast include Leontia Flynn, Medbh McGuckian and Sinéad Morrissey.

=== Writers of County Londonderry ===
The city of Derry and surrounding countryside of County Londonderry are well known for their literary legacy, including the Restoration dramatist George Farquhar, poet Seamus Heaney, poet Seamus Deane, playwright Brian Friel, and writer and music critic Nik Cohn, authors Joyce Cary, Jennifer Johnston and others.

== See also ==
- Irish poetry
- Irish Pages
- Literature in the other languages of Britain
- Scottish literature
- Welsh literature
