= List of writers from Northern Ireland =

Writers from Northern Ireland include literary figures such as poets, novelists, essayists, and scholars who were born in or spent a significant portion of their career in Northern Ireland.

== B ==
- Tony Bailie
- Jo Bannister (born 1951)
- Colin Bateman (born 1962)
- Ronan Bennett (born 1956)
- Maureen Boyle (born 1961)
- Kenneth Branagh (born 1960)
- Colette Bryce (born 1970)
- Eve Bunting (born 1928)
- James Burke (born 1936)
- Anna Burns (born 1962)

== C ==
- Lucy Caldwell (born 1982)
- Joseph Campbell (1879–1944)
- William Carleton (novelist) (1794–1869)
- Thomas Carnduff (1886–1956)
- Ciarán Carson (1948–2019)
- Joyce Cary (1888–1957)
- James Cousins (1873–1956)
- Kathleen Coyle (1886–1952)
- Mairtín Crawford (1967–2004)
- Sam Cree (1928–1980)
- Eric Cross (1905–1980)

== D ==
- Gerald Dawe (born 1952)
- Seamus Deane (1940–2021)
- Anne Devlin (born 1951)
- Susannah Dickey
- Richard Doherty (born 1948)
- Moyra Donaldson (born 1956)
- Charles Donnelly (1914–1937)
- John Dougherty (born 1964)
- Garbhan Downey (born 1966)

== E ==
- St. John Greer Ervine (1883–1971)

== F ==
- Padraic Fiacc (1924–2019)
- Leontia Flynn (born 1974)
- Brendan Foley (born 1964)
- Brian Friel (1929–2015)
- Seamus Finnegan (born 1949)

== G ==
- Stephen Gilbert (1912–2010)
- Robert Greacen (1920–2008)

== H ==
- Sam Hanna Bell (1909–1990)
- Francis Harvey (1925–2014)
- Seamus Heaney (1939–2013)
- John Hewitt (1907–1987)
- Sir John Heygate, 4th Baronet (1903–1976)
- Gareth Higgins (born 1975)
- Bulmer Hobson (1882–1969)
- Tim Hodkinson (born 1971)

== J ==
- Carolyn Jess-Cooke (born 1978)
- Fred Johnston (born 1951)

== K ==
- Brian Keenan (born 1950)
- Brian Kennedy (born 1966)
- Benedict Kiely (1919–2007)

== L ==
- Nick Laird (born 1975)
- Maurice Leitch (1933–2023)
- Clive Staples Lewis (1898–1963)
- Antonia Logue (born 1972)
- Michael Longley (1939–2025)
- Robert Wilson Lynd (1879–1949)

== M ==
- Bernard MacLaverty (born 1942)
- Louis MacNeice (1907–1963)
- Deirdre Madden (born 1960)
- Derek Mahon (1941–2020)
- Philip MacCann (born 1967)
- Owen McCafferty (born 1961)
- Eamonn McCann (born 1943)
- Hugh McFadden
- Roy McFadden (1921–1999)
- Medbh McGuckian (born 1950)
- Christina McKenna
- Adrian McKinty
- David McKittrick (born 1949)
- Robert McLiam Wilson (born 1966)
- Nigel McLoughlin (born 1968)
- George McWhirter (born 1939)
- Eoin McNamee (born 1961)
- Sam Millar (born 1955)
- Alice Milligan (1865–1953)
- Gary Mitchell (born 1965)
- Frances Molloy (1947–1991), novelist
- Brian Moore (1921–1999)
- Sinéad Morrissey (born 1972)
- Danny Morrison (born 1953)
- Paul Muldoon (born 1951)
- Paul Murray (born 1947)
- Tony Macaulay (writer) (born 1963)

== N ==
- Stuart Neville (born 1972)

== O ==
- Flann O'Brien (1911–1966)
- Conor O'Callaghan (born 1968)
- Malachi O'Doherty (born 1951)
- Moira O'Neill (1864–1955)
- Séamus Ó Néill (1910–1986)
- Frank Ormsby (born 1947)
- James Orr (1770–1816)

== P ==
- Stewart Parker (1941–1988)
- Glenn Patterson (born 1961)
- Tom Paulin (born 1945)
- William Peskett (born 1952)

== R ==
- Zane Radcliffe (born 1969)
- Christina Reid (1942–2015)
- Forrest Reid (1875–1947)
- Graham Reid (born 1945)
- Amanda McKittrick Ross (1860–1939)
- Richard Rowley (1877–1947)
- George William Russell (1867–1935)

== S ==
- Ian Sansom (born 1966)
- Bob Shaw (1931–1996)
- George Shiels (1886–1949)
- James Simmons (1933–2001)
- Geoffrey Squires (born 1942)

== T ==
- Gerald J. Tate (born 1954)
- Sam Thompson (1916–1965)
- Joseph Tomelty (1911–1995)

== W ==
- James White (1928–1999)
- Robert McLiam Wilson (born 1964)

== Y ==
- Ella Young (1865–1951)
- Keio Yoshida (Born 1985)

== See also ==
- Literature of Northern Ireland
