= John Morrow (writer) =

Northern Irish writer

John Morrow (1930–2014) was a Northern Ireland short story writer and novelist. He began writing short stories in the 1960s, and his first works were published in The Honest Ulsterman and the Irish Press.

== Background and career ==
Morrow was born in Belfast, Northern Ireland. He left school at the age of 14 to become an apprentice in the linen trade, and later worked as a shipyard navvy and an insurance agent. In 1978, he joined the Arts Council of Northern Ireland, becoming Director of Combined Arts with responsibility for literature and community arts in 1991, retiring in 1995.

== Publications ==
- The Confessions of Proinsias O’Toole (1977)
- The Essex Factor (1982)
- The Annals of Ballyturdeen (1996)
- Pruck: A Life in Bits and Pieces (a collection of short autobiographical works) (1999)

Morrow's short fiction is gathered in two collections:

- Northern Myths (1979)
- Sects and Other Stories (1987)
