= John Hewitt (poet) =

Northern Irish poet (1907–1987)

John Harold Hewitt (28 October 1907 – 22 June 1987) was perhaps the most significant Belfast poet to emerge before the 1960s generation of Northern Irish poets that included Seamus Heaney, Derek Mahon and Michael Longley. He was appointed the first writer-in-residence at Queen's University Belfast in 1976. His collections include The Day of the Corncrake (1969) and Out of My Time: Poems 1969 to 1974 (1974). He was also made a Freeman of the City of Belfast in 1983, and was awarded honorary doctorates by the University of Ulster and Queen's University Belfast.

From November 1930 to 1957, Hewitt held positions in the Belfast Museum & Art Gallery. His radical socialist ideals proved unacceptable to the Belfast Unionist establishment and he was passed over for promotion in 1953. Instead in 1957 he moved to Coventry, a city still rebuilding following its devastation during World War II . Hewitt was appointed Director of the Herbert Art Gallery & Museum where he worked until retirement in 1972.

Hewitt had an active political life, describing himself as "a man of the left", and was involved in the British Labour Party, the Fabian Society and the Belfast Peace League. He was attracted to the Ulster dissenting tradition and was drawn to a concept of regional identity within the island of Ireland, describing his identity as Ulster, Irish, British and European. John Hewitt officially opened the Belfast Unemployed Resource Centre (BURC) Offices on Mayday 1985.

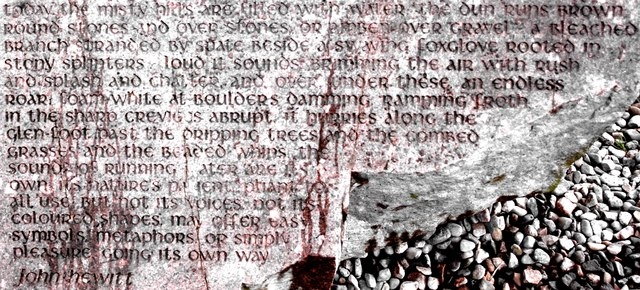
Words by John Hewitt on the Cushendun Stone.

His life and work are celebrated in two prominent ways – the annual John Hewitt International Summer School – and, less conventionally, a Belfast pub is named after him – the John Hewitt Bar and Restaurant, which is situated on the city's Donegall Street and which opened in 1999. The bar was named after him as many years earlier he had opened the Belfast Unemployed Resource Centre, which owns the establishment. It is a popular meeting place for local writers, musicians, journalists, students and artists. Both the Belfast International Arts Festival and the Belfast Film Festival use the venue to stage events.

== Hewitt's life and writing ==
=== Early life ===
After attending Agnes Street National School, Hewitt attended the Royal Belfast Academical Institution from 1919 to 1920 before moving to Methodist College Belfast, where he was a keen cricketer. In 1924, he started an English degree at the Queen's University of Belfast, obtaining a BA in 1930, which he followed by obtaining a teaching qualification from Stranmillis College, Belfast. During these years, his calling to radical and socialist causes deepened; he heard James Larkin address a Labour rally, began to write for a range of Trades Union and Socialist publications, and co-founded a journal entitled Iskra. Hewitt also attended the Northern Ireland Labour Party Annual Conference as a Belfast City delegate in 1929 and 1930. He resisted the advocacy of a workers' republic in the party's constitution.

In 1930, Hewitt was appointed Art Assistant at the Belfast Museum and Art Gallery, where amongst other duties, he gave public lectures on art, at one of which he met Roberta "Ruby" Black, whom he was to marry in 1934. Roberta was also a convinced Socialist, and the couple became members of the Independent Labour Party, the Belfast Peace League, the Left Book Club and the British Civil Liberties Union.

=== Early writing ===
Hewitt began experimenting with poetry while still a schoolboy at Methodist College in the 1920s. Typically thorough, his notebooks from these years are filled with hundreds of poems, in dozens of styles; Hewitt's main influences at this time included William Blake, William Morris and W. B. Yeats, and for the most part the verse is either highly romantic, or strongly socialist, a theme which increased in prominence as the 1930s began. Morris is the key figure, combining both these strains, and allowing Hewitt to articulate the radical, dissenting strain which he inherited from his Methodist forebears, including his father.

As the 1920s moved into the 1930s, Hewitt's writing began to develop and mature. Firstly, his role models (including Vachel Lindsay) became more modern; secondly, he discovered in Chinese poetry a voice which was "quiet and undemonstrative but clear and direct", and which answered a part of Hewitt's temperament which had been suppressed. Finally, and most importantly, he began his lifelong work of excavation and discovery of the poetry of Ulster, starting with Richard Rowley, Joseph Campbell and George William Russell (AE). This research culminated, in part, with the publications of Fibres, Fabric and Cordage in 1948, Rhyming Weavers and other Country Poets of Antrim and Down (based on his MA thesis, Ulster Poets 1800–1870 of 1951) in 1974, and a book called The Rhyming Weavers in 1979. All of these publications and more, were based on his interest in the Ulster rhyming weaver poets of the 19th century, such as Henry MacDonald Flecher, David Herbison, Alexander MacKenzie, James MacKowen, and James Orr.

Hewitt himself felt that his juvenilia ended with the poem Ireland (1932), which he placed at the start of his Collected Poems (1968), and indeed it is more complex than most of his earlier work, and begins his lifelong preoccupation with bleak landscapes of bog and rock; with exile, and with the nature of belonging.

=== The 1930s ===
The 1930s was a period of transition in Hewitt's poetry, one in which he began seriously to address the history of his native province, and the contradictions between his love for the people and the landscape, his inspiration in the radical dissenting tradition, and the conflicts which mark Northern Ireland. A key text is The Bloody Brae: A Dramatic Poem (finished in 1936, though not broadcast – on the Northern Ireland Home Service of the BBC – until 1954; the Belfast Lyric Players performed a stage version in 1957, which they revived in 1986), which tells of a legendary massacre of Roman Catholics by Cromwellian troops in Islandmagee, County Antrim, in 1642. John Hill, one of the soldiers who has been racked by guilt since he participated in the slaughter, returns many years later to beg forgiveness. This he receives from the ghost of one of his victims, a gesture which she wraps in a condemnation of his self-indulgence, luxuriating in his guilt rather than taking positive action to combat bigotry. Another theme which was to become a fixture in Hewitt's poetry also first appears in The Bloody Brae; that is, a bold assertion of the right of his people to live in Ulster, rooted in their hard work and commitment to it:

This is my country; my grandfather came here
and raised his walls and fenced the tangled waste
and gave his years and strength into the earth

Also in the 1930s, Hewitt was involved with a group of young artists and sculptors known as the 'Ulster Unit', and acted as their secretary.

=== 1940s and 1950s ===
From the late thirties Hewitt was one of a set of Linen Hall Library members who would regularly retire to Campbell's Cafe in Belfast's city centre. The regulars, at various points, included writers John Boyd, Denis Ireland, Sam Hanna Bell and Richard Rowley, actors Joseph Tomelty, Jack Loudon and J.G. Devlin, the poet Robert Greacen, artists Padraic Woods, Gerard Dillon, Harry Cooke Knox and William Conor and (an outspoken opponent of sectarianism) the Rev. Arthur Agnew. The ebullient atmosphere the circle created was a backdrop to the appearance of Campbell's Cafe in Brian Moore's wartime Bildungsroman, The Emperor of Ice-Cream.

During the 1940s and 1950s, Hewitt helped young Ulster poets by providing them with room, board and advice while he increasingly played the role of reviewer and art critic. He gained an MA from Queen's University Belfast, with a thesis on Ulster poets from 1800 to 1870, in 1951. In 1951 he had been appointed deputy director and keeper of art at the Belfast Museum and Art Gallery but in 1957, Hewitt left to take up the position of Art Director at the Herbert Art Gallery and Museum in Coventry, a position he held until 1972. While in Coventry, Hewitt started work on his unpublished autobiography, A North Light. He subsequently returned to Belfast on his retirement in 1972. The John Hewitt Estate and Four Courts Press published A North Light: twenty-five years in a Municipal Gallery in 2013.

== Legacy ==
The John Hewitt Society was established in 1987 to commemorate his life and work. Its mission is "to promote literature, arts, and culture inspired by the ideals and ideas of the poet John Hewitt". The Society runs an annual summer school.

== Bibliography ==
=== Poetry ===
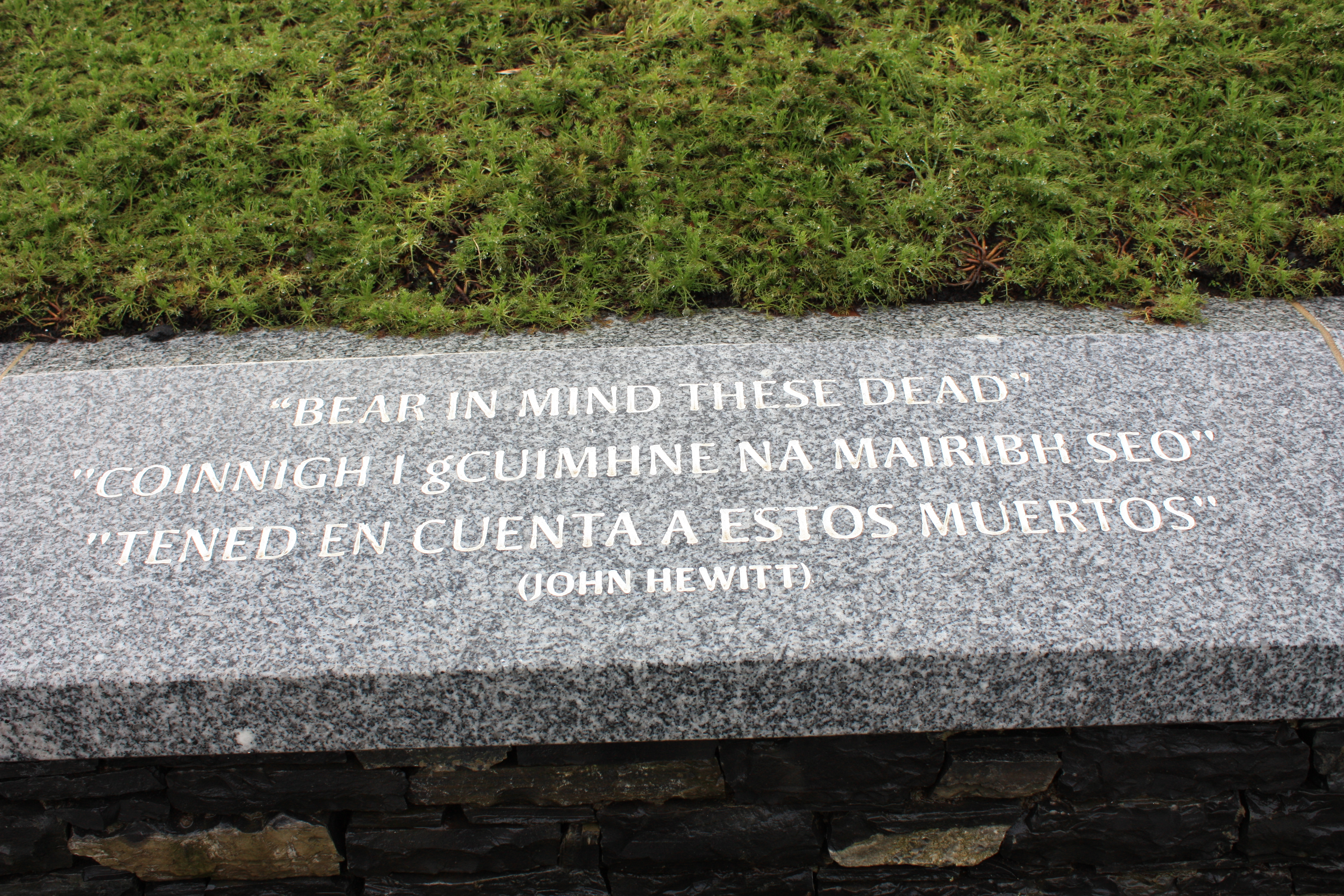
Omagh Bomb Memorial (Garden of Light), Drumragh Avenue, Omagh, County Tyrone, Northern Ireland

Hewitt's poem Neither an Elegy nor a Manifesto was recited at the August 2008 remembrance service 10 years after the Omagh bomb. Translations in Irish and Spanish of the final line "Bear in mind these dead" were read out from the site of the blast.

Other poems include:

- Conacre (privately printed, 1943)
- No Rebel Word (Frederick Muller, 1948)
- The Lint Pulling (1948)
- Those Swans Remember: a poem (privately printed, 1956)
- Tesserae (Queen's University Belfast Festival Publication, 1967)
- Collected Poems 1932–1967 (MacGibbon & Kee, 1968)
- The Day of the Corncrake: poems of the nine glens (Glens of Antrim Historical Society, 1969; 2nd edition 1984)
- The Planter and the Gael: an anthology of poems by John Hewitt & John Montague (Arts Council of Northern Ireland, 1970)
- An Ulster Reckoning (privately printed, 1971)
- The Chinese Fluteplayer (privately printed, 1974)
- Scissors for a One-Armed Tailor: Marginal Verses 1929–1954 (privately printed, 1974)
- Out of My Time: poems 1967–1974 (Blackstaff Press, 1974)
- Time Enough: Poems New and Revised (Blackstaff Press, 1976)
- The Rain Dance: Poems New and Revised (Blackstaff Press, 1978)
- Kites in Spring: a Belfast boyhood (Blackstaff Press, 1980)
- The Selected John Hewitt (Blackstaff Press, 1981)
- Mosaic (Blackstaff Press, 1981)
- Loose Ends (Blackstaff Press, 1983)
- Freehold and Other Poems (Blackstaff Press, 1986)
- The Collected Poems of John Hewitt (Ed. Frank Ormsby) (Blackstaff Press, 1991)

=== Prose ===
- Ancestral Voices: the selected prose of John Hewitt (Ed. Tom Clyde) (Blackstaff Press, 1987)

=== Drama ===
- Two Plays: The McCrackens, The Angry Dove (Ed. Damian Smyth) (Lagan Press, 1999)

=== Art criticism ===
- Colin Middleton (Arts Council/An Chomhairle Ealaíon and the Arts Council of Northern Ireland, 1976)
- Art in Ulster (with Mike Catto) (Blackstaff Press, 1977)
- John Luke (artist) 1906–1975 (Arts Council/An Chomhairle Ealaíon and the Arts Council of Northern Ireland, 1978)

=== Editor ===
- The Poems of William Allingham (Oxford University Press/ Dolmen Press, 1967)

== See also ==
- List of Irish writers
