= Department of Culture, Arts and Leisure (Northern Ireland) =

Defunct Northern Irish government department

Department overview
- Formed: 1 December 1999
- Preceding Department: Department of Education Department of Agriculture
- Dissolved: 5 May 2016
- Superseding Department: Department for Communities Department of Agriculture, Environment and Rural Affairs Department for Infrastructure
- Jurisdiction: Northern Ireland
- Headquarters: Causeway Exchange, Bedford Street, Belfast, BT2 7EG
- Employees: 269 (September 2011)
- Annual budget: £112.1 million (current) & £16.3 million (capital) for 2011–12
- Website: www.dcalni.gov.uk

The Department of Culture, Arts and Leisure (DCAL; Irish: An Roinn Cultúir, Ealaíon agus Fóillíochta; Ulster Scots: Männystrie o Fowkgates, Airts an Aisedom) was a devolved government department in the Northern Ireland Executive. The minister with overall responsibility for the department was the Minister of Culture, Arts and Leisure.

After the election to the Northern Ireland Assembly in 2016, the DCAL was closed and its roles and functions were amalgamated with other departments in order to reduce the size of the Northern Ireland Executive.

== Aim ==
DCAL's overall vision was a "confident, creative, informed and healthy society". It described its mission as delivering economic growth and enhancing the quality of life in Northern Ireland by "unlocking the full potential of the culture, arts and leisure sectors."

The last Minister was Carál Ní Chuilín (Sinn Féin). The Minister was, by virtue of office, the Keeper of the Records for Northern Ireland.

== Responsibilities ==
The department had the following main responsibilities:

- architecture;
- the arts;
- cultural diversity;
- inland waterways;
- languages;
- libraries;
- the distribution of National Lottery funding;
- museums;
- the Public Record Office of Northern Ireland (PRONI); and
- sport.

Broadcasting, intellectual property and the administration of the National Lottery are reserved to Westminster and are therefore not devolved.

DCAL's main counterparts in the United Kingdom Government were:

- the Department for Culture, Media and Sport (DCMS);
- the Department for Environment, Food and Rural Affairs (on inland fisheries); and
- the National Archives (on public records).

Its main counterparts in the Irish Government were:

- the Department of Arts, Heritage and the Gaeltacht (on the Irish language);
- the Department of the Environment, Community and Local Government (on public libraries);
- the Department of Transport, Tourism and Sport;
- the Department of Communications, Energy and Natural Resources (on inland fisheries).

== History ==
Following a referendum on the Belfast Agreement on 23 May 1998 and the granting of royal assent to the Northern Ireland Act 1998 on 19 November 1998, a Northern Ireland Assembly and Northern Ireland Executive were established by the United Kingdom Government under Prime Minister Tony Blair. The process was known as devolution and was set up to return devolved legislative powers to Northern Ireland. DCAL was one of five new devolved Northern Ireland departments created in December 1999 by the Northern Ireland Act 1998 and the Departments (Northern Ireland) Order 1999.

A devolved minister first took office on 2 December 1999. Devolution was suspended for four periods, during which the department came under the responsibility of direct rule ministers from the Northern Ireland Office:

- between 12 February 2000 and 30 May 2000;
- on 11 August 2001;
- on 22 September 2001;
- between 15 October 2002 and 8 May 2007.

Under the St Andrews Agreement (signed 13 October 2006), the Executive is obliged to adopt strategies on enhancing and protecting the development of the Irish language and enhancing and developing Ulster Scots language, heritage and culture. The agreement also committed the United Kingdom Government to introducing "an Irish Language Act reflecting on the experience of Wales and Ireland". Welsh and Irish are official languages in those respective countries.

Language policy was devolved, alongside the department's other responsibilities, on 8 May 2007. As of March 2012, neither an Irish language strategy or act, nor an Ulster Scots strategy, had been adopted. The department stated that a Strategy for Indigenous or Regional Minority Languages would "be presented to the Executive in due course".

== Ministers of Culture, Arts and Leisure ==
| Minister | Image | Party | Took office | Left office |
|---|---|---|---|---|
| Michael McGimpsey | | UUP | 29 November 1999 | 11 February 2000 |
Office suspended
| Michael McGimpsey | | UUP | 30 May 2000 | 14 October 2002 |
| Office suspended | | | | |
| Edwin Poots | | DUP | 14 May 2007 | 9 June 2008 |
| Gregory Campbell | | DUP | 9 June 2008 | 30 June 2009 |
| Nelson McCausland | | DUP | 1 July 2009 | 4 May 2011 |
| Carál Ní Chuilín | | Sinn Féin | 16 May 2011 | 30 March 2016 |

=== Direct rule ministers ===
During the periods of suspension, the following ministers of the Northern Ireland Office were responsible for the department:

- George Howarth MP (2000)
- Angela Smith MP (2002–2005)
- David Hanson MP (2005–2006)
- Maria Eagle MP (2006–2007)

== See also ==
- Committee for Culture, Arts and Leisure (Northern Ireland Assembly)
- List of government ministers in Northern Ireland
