= Committee for Culture, Arts and Leisure =

The Committee for Culture, Arts and Leisure was established to advise and assist the Minister for Culture, Arts and Leisure, on matters within his responsibility as a minister. The committee undertook a scrutiny, policy development and consultation role with respect to the Department of Culture, Arts and Leisure and played a key role in the consideration and development of legislation.

The committee was abolished in 2016 because the Department of Culture, Arts and Leisure was closed and its mandate was transferred to other departments.

== Membership ==
Membership before DCAL's closure:

Party	Member
Alliance	Kieran McCarthy
DUP	Wallace Browne
DUP	Nelson McCausland
DUP	Jim Shannon
Sinn Féin	Francie Brolly
Sinn Féin	Raymond McCartney
Sinn Féin	Barry McElduff (Chairperson)
SDLP	Dominic Bradley
SDLP	Pat Ramsey (Deputy Chairperson)
UUP	David McNarry
UUP	Ken Robinson

== See also ==
- Department of Culture, Arts and Leisure
