= Ruth Carr =

Northern Irish writer

Ruth Carr (born 1953), also known as Ruth Hooley, is a Northern Irish writer.

A poet, Carr has edited several anthologies of writing by women, including the first anthology of Northern Irish women's literature. She has worked to promote the publication of writing by women and members of other underrepresented groups. Carr served as co-editor of the poetry magazine The Honest Ulsterman for 15 years.

== Early life and education ==
Ruth Carr was born in Belfast in 1953. She studied at Queen's University Belfast, Stranmillis University College, and Ulster University.

== Career ==
Carr's work is primarily as a poet and editor. Her poetry has been described as having "sensuous immediacy and moral wit."

She has published three solo poetry collections. Her first, There is a House, was published in 1999, followed by The Airing Cupboard in 2008. Her most recent collection, 2017's Feather and Bone, draws on the lives of Mary Ann McCracken and Dorothy Wordsworth.

In 1985, Carr edited the seminal anthology The Female Line, the first literary anthology of work by Northern Irish women writers. Initial funding for the book, which was published by the Northern Ireland Women's Rights Movement, came from the Equal Opportunities Commission, as well as local trade unions. Alongside established authors, several of the women whose work was included in the collection had never been published before. The anthology sold out within a month of its first printing, and it was revived in 2016 in a digital format.

Carr also contributed to 2002's The Field Day Anthology of Irish Writing, editing the section on contemporary women's fiction. She became a founding member of the Word of Mouth women's poetry collective in 1991, and she co-edited its 1996 anthology Word of Mouth: Poems. In 2020, she co-edited the anthology Her Other Language: Northern Irish Women Writers Address Domestic Violence and Abuse with Natasha Cuddington.

She served for 15 years as co-editor of the literary magazine The Honest Ulsterman. In 2003, she oversaw production of its final print issue, which honoured the late poet and Honest Ulsterman founding editor James Simmons.

In 2017, her work was included in the collection Female Lines, a spiritual successor to her 1985 anthology, edited by Linda Anderson and Dawn Miranda Sherratt-Bado. In 2021, she was featured in the anthology Look! It’s A Woman Writer!: Irish Literary Feminisms 1970–2020.

Carr, who lives in Belfast, has also worked as an educator, specializing in adult literacy.

== Personal life ==
Carr was previously married to record store owner Terri Hooley, with whom she had her elder daughter.

== Selected works ==
- The Female Line (editor, 1985)
- There Is a House (1999)
- The Airing Cupboard (2008)
- Feather and Bone (2017)
- Her Other Language (co-editor, 2020)
