= Glenoe dialect =

Dialect of Scots

- Glenoe Scots
- Native to: Ulster
- Region: Glenoe district in East Antrim
- Ethnicity: Ulster Scots people
- Language family: Indo-European: Germanic; West Germanic; North Sea Germanic; Anglo-Frisian; Glenoe dialect
- Early forms: Proto-English: Northumbrian Old English; Early Middle English; Early Scots; Middle Scots

Language codes
- ISO 639-3: –
- Glottolog: None

The Glenoe dialect is an Ulster Scots dialect spoken in the Glenoe district in East Antrim, Northern Ireland.

== Phonology ==
=== Consonants ===
Consonant phonemes
			Labial	Dental	Alveolar	Palatal	Velar	Glottal
Nasal			m		n	ɲ	ŋ	
Plosive / affricate		voiceless	p		t	tʃ	k	
Plosive / affricate		voiced	b		d	dʒ	ɡ	
Fricative		voiceless	f	θ	s	ʃ	x	h
Fricative		voiced	v	ð	z	ʒ		
Approximant	median	voiced			r	j	w	
Approximant	median	voiceless					ʍ	
Approximant	lateral				l	ʎ		

- /n, t, d/ are realized as interdental [n̪, t̪, d̪] before /r/ and /ər/, as in try [t̪ɾɑe] 'try', cooter [ˈkʉt̪əɹ] 'coulter' and bederel [ˈbɛd̪əɾəl] 'bed-ridden invalid'. Before [t̪, d̪], /l/ also becomes interdental [l̪], as in helter [ˈhɛl̪t̪əɹ] 'halter'. As these allophones are fully predictable, the diacritic is omitted elsewhere in the article.
- /p, t, k/ in word-medial and word-final positions, may be pronounced with a simultaneous glottal stop [ʔ] among speakers.
- /tʃ, dʒ, ʃ, ʒ/ are phonetically alveolo-palatal sibilants articulated with spread lips [tɕ, dʑ, ɕ, ʑ].
- /x/ has two allophones:
  - Normally, it is a voiceless post-velar fricative with a simultaneous voiceless uvular trill [x̠͡ʀ̥] (hereafter written with a plain ⟨x⟩), much like Northern Dutch ⟨g⟩ in the word geel [x̠͡ʀ̥eɪl] 'yellow'.
  - After front vowels (such as /i/), it is realized as a voiceless post-palatal fricative [ç˗] (hereafter represented without the diacritic), similar to the German Ich-Laut, but slightly more back. This consonant also occurs as an allophone of the initial sequence /hj/, so that huge /hjʉdʒ/ 'huge' may be pronounced [çʉdʒ].
- /r/ is normally an approximant [ɹ]. After /t, d, θ/, it is realized as a tap [ɾ]. This is also the case in the sequence /CərV/ (where /C/ stands for any of /n, t, d, θ, ð, l/), as in footery [ˈfʉtəɾe] 'clumsy'. In initial clusters after consonants other than /t, d, θ/, Gregg describes a realization intermediate between an approximant [ɹ] and a tap [ɾ], i.e. a brief non-sibilant fricative [ɾ̞] (as in brush [bɾ̞ʌʃ] 'brush'). Elsewhere in the article, this allophone is written with a plain ⟨ɾ⟩.
- /l/ is clear [l]. The velarized [ɫ] found in many English dialects does not exist in Glenoe.

=== Vowels ===
Vowels of Glenoe Scots, from Gregg (1953, Section 3 Phonetics)

Monophthong phonemes
	Front	Central		Back	
	Front	unrounded	rounded	unrounded	rounded
Close	i	ɨ	ʉ		o
Close-mid	e	ə			
Open-mid	ɛ			ʌ	ɔ
Open		ɐ		ɑ	
Diphthongs	əi əʉ ɔe ɑe				

- Vowel length is governed by the Scottish vowel length rule and is therefore non-phonemic. /ɨ, ɐ, ʌ/ and the unstressed-only /ə/ are always short, whereas /e, ɛ, a, ɔ, o/ are normally long but can be shortened due to the SVLR. Conversely, both /i/ and /ʉ/ are normally short, but can be lengthened due to the SVLR.
- /i, e, ɛ/ are slightly lower than the corresponding cardinal vowels, but the difference is not very big.
- /ɨ/, a phonologically central vowel, is further front and more open than cardinal [ɨ]: [ɨ̟˕]. Before /r/, it is lengthened and slightly lowered to [ɘ̟ː] (transcribed with ⟨ɨː⟩ in this article).
- /ʉ/, a phonologically central vowel, is further front than cardinal [ʉ] but not quite as front as the German /ʏ/ and /yː/. The long allophone is almost fully close [ʉ̟ː], but the short allophone is somewhat lower: [ʉ̟˕]. Before /r/, a long open [ʉ̟˕ː] is found to the exclusion of [ʉ̟ː]. For simplicity, both long allophones are written with ⟨ʉː⟩ in this article, whereas the short allophone is written with ⟨ʉ⟩.
- /o/ is more strongly rounded and closer than the cardinal [o]: [o̹˔]. It is similar in quality to Swedish and Norwegian /uː/.
- In certain fused verb forms, /e/ is realized as [ɪ]. An example of that is hae tae [ˈhɪtə] 'have to' (cf. hae [heː] 'have'). It also occurs as an allophone of /ɐ/ in unstressed syllables (in e.g. Pawlish [ˈpɔːlɪʃ] 'Polish'). Its phonetic quality is similar to that of /ɨ/ but more front. It is close to the KIT vowel (/ɪ/) in RP.
- /ə/ is close-mid [ɘ].
- /ʌ, ɔ/ are near-back [ʌ̟, ɔ̟].
- /ɐ/ is near-open near-front [ɐ̟]. It corresponds to English /ɪ/, which in most English dialects is much closer [ɪ]. However, a similar sound of an [ɐ̟] quality is used by some speakers of Ulster English.
- /ɑ/ is near-back: [ɑ̟], much like RP /ɑː/.

== Bibliography ==
- Collins, Beverley; Mees, Inger M. (1982). "A phonetic description of the consonant system of Standard Dutch (ABN)". Journal of the International Phonetic Association. 12 (1): 2–12. doi:10.1017/S0025100300002358. JSTOR 44526677. S2CID 144910869.
- Gregg, Robert J. (1953). Smyth, Anne; Montgomery, Michael; Robinson, Philip (eds.). Phonology of an East Antrim Dialect. The Academic Study of Ulster Scots (Thesis). Archived from the original on 2018-03-27.
