= Near-close near-back rounded vowel =

Vowel sound represented by ⟨ʊ⟩ in IPA

ʊ
- IPA number: 321

Audio sample
- source · help

Encoding
- Entity (decimal): &#650;
- Unicode (hex): U+028A
- X-SAMPA: U
- Braille: ⠷ (braille pattern dots-12356)
Image

IPA: Vowels

	Front	Central	Back
Close	i y	ɨ ʉ	ɯ u
Near-close	ɪ ʏ		ʊ
Close-mid	e ø	ɘ ɵ	ɤ o
Mid	e̞ ø̞	ə	ɤ̞ o̞
Open-mid	ɛ œ	ɜ ɞ	ʌ ɔ
Near-open	æ	ɐ
Open	a ɶ	ä	ɑ ɒ

- IPA help
- audio
- full chart
- template

Legend: unrounded • rounded

The near-close near-back rounded vowel, or near-high near-back rounded vowel, is a type of vowel sound, used in some spoken languages. It is found in English in the word hook. The symbol in the International Phonetic Alphabet that represents this sound is ⟨ʊ⟩ (a Latin upsilon, sometimes informally referred to as "horseshoe U"). Prior to 1989, there was an alternate IPA symbol for this sound, ⟨ɷ⟩ (a closed small letter Latin omega); use of this symbol is no longer sanctioned by the IPA. In Americanist phonetic notation, the symbol ⟨ᴜ⟩ (a small capital U) is used, which was also the original symbol for the vowel used by the IPA in 1900.

The Handbook of the International Phonetic Association defines [ʊ] as a mid-centralized (lowered and centralized) close back rounded vowel (transcribed [u̽] or [ü̞]), and the current official IPA name of the vowel transcribed with the symbol ⟨ʊ⟩ is a near-close near-back rounded vowel.

However, some languages have a vowel that is somewhat lower than the canonical value of [ʊ], though it still fits the definition of a mid-centralized [u]. It occurs in some dialects of English (such as General American and Geordie), as well as some other languages (such as Maastrichtian Limburgish). It can be narrowly transcribed with [ʊ̞] (a lowered ⟨ʊ⟩), [o̟] (a fronted ⟨o⟩), or [ɵ̠] (a retracted ⟨ɵ⟩). For precision, this can be described as a close-mid near-back rounded vowel.

Additionally, in some languages (such as Bengali and Luxembourgish), as well as some dialects of English (such as Scottish), there is a fully back near-close rounded vowel (a sound between cardinal ⟨u⟩ and ⟨o⟩), which can be transcribed in IPA with [ʊ̠], [u̞] or [o̝]. For precision, this can be described as a near-close back rounded vowel, or near-high back rounded vowel.

Sometimes, especially in broad transcription, this vowel is transcribed with a simpler symbol ⟨u⟩, which technically represents the close back rounded vowel.

== Near-close back protruded vowel ==
The near-close back protruded vowel is typically transcribed in IPA simply as ⟨ʊ⟩, and that is the convention used in this article. As there is no dedicated diacritic for protrusion in the IPA, symbol for the near-close back rounded vowel with an old diacritic for labialization, ⟨ ̫⟩, can be used as an ad hoc symbol ⟨ʊ̫⟩ for the near-close back protruded vowel. Another possible transcription is ⟨ʊʷ⟩ or ⟨ɯ̽ʷ⟩ (a near-close back vowel modified by endolabialization), but this could be misread as a diphthong.

The close-mid near-back protruded vowel can be transcribed ⟨ʊ̞ʷ⟩ or ⟨ʊ̫˕⟩, whereas the fully back near-close protruded vowel can be transcribed ⟨u̞ʷ⟩, ⟨ɯ̞ʷ⟩ or ⟨u̫˕⟩.

=== Features ===
- Its vowel height is near-close, also known as near-high, which means the tongue is not quite so constricted as a close vowel (high vowel).
- Its vowel backness is back, which means the tongue is positioned back in the mouth without creating a constriction that would be classified as a consonant. The prototypical [ʊ] is somewhat further front (near-back) than the neighboring cardinal vowels.
- Its place of articulation is velar, which means it is articulated with the back of the tongue (the dorsum) at the soft palate.
- Its roundedness is protruded, which means that the corners of the lips are drawn together, and the inner surfaces exposed. The prototypical [ʊ] has a weak protruded rounding, more like [ɔ] than the neighboring cardinal vowels.
Sagittal section of a vocal tract pronouncing the IPA sound ʊ. Note that a wavy glottis in this diagram indicates a voiced sound.

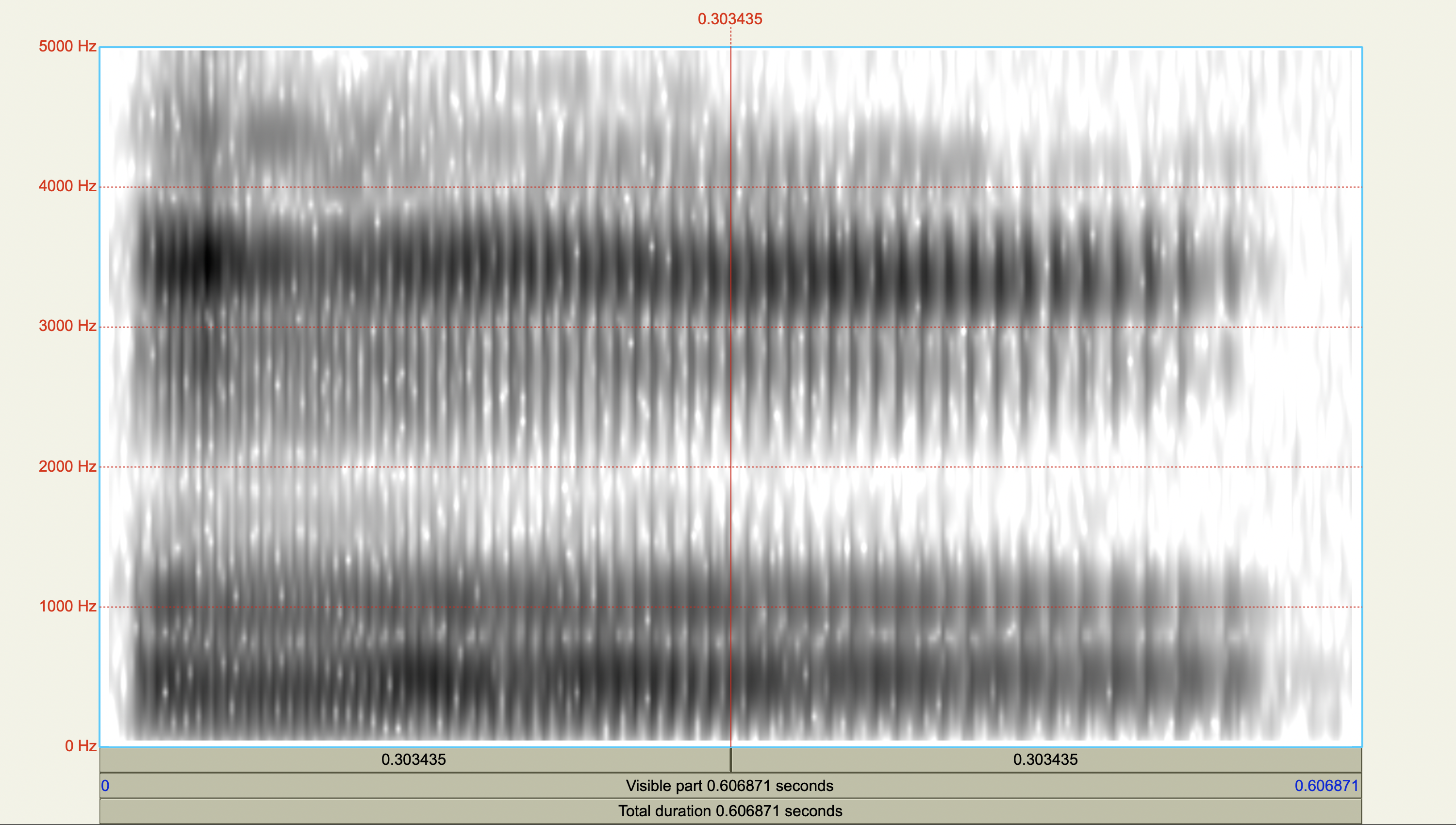
Spectrogram of [ʊ]

=== Occurrence ===
Because back rounded vowels are assumed to have protrusion, and few descriptions cover the distinction, some of the following may actually have compression. In the table below, vowels transcribed with ⟨o̝⟩ have a considerably stronger rounding than the prototypical value of ⟨ʊ⟩.

Language		Word	IPA	Meaning	Notes
Afrikaans	Standard	Botha	[ˈbʊ̞ˑta]	'Botha'	Close-mid. Allophone of /ʊə/ in less stressed words, in stressed syllables of polysyllabic words and word-finally when unstressed. In the second case, it is in free variation with the diphthongal realization [ʊə̯ ~ ʊ̯ə ~ ʊə]. See Afrikaans phonology
Arabic	Hejazi	قُلْت (gult)	[gʊlt]	'I said'	Allophone of /u/ in medial and initial positions. See Hejazi phonology
Assamese		কোৰ (kûr)	[kʊɹ]	'hoe'	Close-mid; also described as open [ɒ].
Bengali	Eastern dialects	তুমি (tumī)	[ˈt̪u̞ˌmiː]	'you'	Fully back; typically transcribed in IPA with ⟨u⟩. See Bengali phonology
Burmese		မွတ် (mā)	[mʊʔ]	'smooth'	Allophone of /u/ in syllables closed by a glottal stop and when nasalized.
Catalan	Balearic	sucar	[sʊˈkɑ(ɾ)]	'to soak'	Unstressed allophone of /u/. See Catalan phonology
Catalan	Valencian	sucar	[sʊˈkɑ(ɾ)]	'to soak'	Unstressed allophone of /u/. See Catalan phonology
Chinese	Mandarin	红 (hóng)	[xʊŋ˧˥]	'red'	Fully back; height varies between mid and close depending on the speaker. See Standard Chinese phonology
Chinese	Shanghainese	瓜 (kù)	[kʊ˩]	'melon'	The height varies between close and close-mid; contrasts with a close to close-mid back compressed vowel.
Danish	Standard	mave	[ˈmɛːʊ]	'stomach'	Phonetic realization of the sequence /və/. See Danish phonology
Dutch	Standard Northern	oren	[ˈʊːrə(n)]	'ears'	Allophone of /oː/ before /r/. Can be a centering diphthong [ʊə] instead, especially before coda /r/. See Dutch phonology
Dutch	Randstad	oren	[ˈʊːrə(n)]	'ears'	Allophone of /oː/ before /r/. Can be a centering diphthong [ʊə] instead, especially before coda /r/. See Dutch phonology
Dutch	Some speakers	hok	[ɦʊk]	'den'	Contrasts with /ɔ/ in certain words, but many speakers have only one vowel /ɔ/. See Dutch phonology
English	Irish	hook	[hʊk]	'hook'	
English	Welsh	hook	[hʊk]	'hook'	In Cardiff, it is advanced and lowered to [ɵ], often also with unrounding to [ɘ].
English	Cockney	hook	[ʊʔk]	'hook'	Sometimes fronted to [ʊ̈].
English	Conservative New Zealand	hook	[hʊʔk]	'hook'	The height varies from near-close to close-mid. The innovative General New Zealand variant is fronted and unrounded to [ɪ̈ ~ ɘ]. See New Zealand English phonology
English	Conservative Received Pronunciation	hook	[hʊʔk]	'hook'	Often lowered and advanced to [ɵ], or unrounded to [ɘ]. See English phonology
English	Multicultural London	hook	[hʊʔk]	'hook'	May be front [ʏ] instead.
English	Norfolk	hook	[hʊʔk]	'hook'	
English	Some Estuary speakers	hook	[hʊʔk]	'hook'	Often advanced to [ʊ̈ ~ ʏ], or advanced and lowered to [ɵ ~ ʏ̞].
English	General American	hook	[hʊ̞k]	'hook'	Close-mid.
English	Geordie	hook	[hʊ̞k]	'hook'	Close-mid.
English	Southern Michigan	hook	[hʊ̞k]	'hook'	Close-mid.
English	Northern England	cut	[kʊt]	'cut'	Phonetic realization of /ʌ/ in most dialects without the foot–strut split.
English	Local Dublin	cut	[kʊt]	'cut'	Phonetic realization of /ʌ/ in most dialects without the foot–strut split.
English	Australian	thought	[θo̝ːt]	'thought'	Fully back. In New Zealand English, the height varies from near-close [o̝ː] (a typical value in General NZE) to mid [o̞ː] (a typical value in Maori English). It corresponds to [ɔː] in other dialects. See Australian English phonology and New Zealand English phonology
English	General New Zealand	thought	[θo̝ːt]	'thought'	Fully back. In New Zealand English, the height varies from near-close [o̝ː] (a typical value in General NZE) to mid [o̞ː] (a typical value in Maori English). It corresponds to [ɔː] in other dialects. See Australian English phonology and New Zealand English phonology
English	Scottish	go	[ɡo̝ː]	'go'	Fully back. Corresponds to [oʊ]~[əʊ] in other dialects.
Faroese		gult	[kʊɬt]	'yellow'	See Faroese phonology
French	Quebec	foule	[fʊl]	'crowd'	Allophone of /u/ in closed syllables. See Quebec French phonology
German	Standard	Stunde	[ˈʃtʊndə]	'hour'	The quality has been variously described as near-close back [ʊ̠] and close-mid near-back [ʊ̞]. For some speakers, it may be as high as [u]. See Standard German phonology
Hindustani	Hindi	गुलाब (gulāb)	[gʊˈläːb]	'rose'	See Hindustani phonology
Hindustani	Urdu	گلاب (gulāb)	[gʊˈläːb]	'rose'	See Hindustani phonology
Hungarian		ujj	[ʊjː]	'finger'	Typically transcribed in IPA with ⟨u⟩. See Hungarian phonology
Irish	Munster	dubh	[d̪ˠʊvˠ]	'black'	Allophone of /ʊ/ between broad consonants. See Irish phonology
Italian	Central-Southern accents	ombra	[ˈo̝mbrä]	'shade'	Fully back; local realization of /o/. See Italian phonology
Kurdish	Kurmanji (Northern)	gul	[gʊl]	'flower'	See Kurdish phonology
Kurdish	Sorani (Central)	گـوڵ (gul)	[gʊl]	'flower'	See Kurdish phonology
Kurdish	Palewani (Southern)	گـوڵ (gul)	[gʊl]	'flower'	See Kurdish phonology
Leonese		butiellu	[buˈtjeʎʊ]	'Botillo'	Allophone position of /u/ and /o/ in neutral position.
Limburgish	Some dialects	póp	[pʊ̞p]	'doll'	Close-mid in the Maastrichtian dialect. The example word is from that dialect.
Lombard		nox	[nʊs̠]	'walnut'	Most common realization of /u/.
Luxembourgish		Sprooch	[ʃpʀo̝ːχ]	'language'	Fully back. Typically transcribed in IPA with ⟨oː⟩. See Luxembourgish phonology
Malay		mampus	[mam.pʊs]	'die'	Allophone of /u/ in closed-final syllables. May be [o] or [o̞] depending on the speaker. See Malay phonology
Pashayi	Lower Darai Nur dialect	صُر (sar)	[sʊ̞r]	'sun'	Close-mid.
Portuguese	Brazilian	pulo	[ˈpulʊ]	'leap'	Reduction and neutralization of unstressed /u, o, ɔ/; can be voiceless. See Portuguese phonology
Russian		сухой (suhoj)	[s̪ʊˈxʷo̞j]	'dry'	Unstressed allophone of /u/. See Russian phonology
Saterland Frisian		Roop	[ʀo̝ːp]	'rope'	Phonetic realization of /oː/ and /ʊ/. Near-close back [o̝ː] in the former case, close-mid near-back [ʊ̞] in the latter. Phonetically, the latter is nearly identical to /ɔː/ ([o̟ː]).
Scots	Glenoe dialect	go	[ɡo̝ː]	'go'	Fully back.
Scots	Rathlin dialect	go	[ɡo̝ː]	'go'	Fully back.
Scottish Gaelic	Some dialects	talamh	[ˈt̪ʰal̪ˠʊ]	'land'	Reduction of word-final /əv/; a similar phenomenon is seen in Ulster Irish.
Sinhalese		හුඟක් (huňgak)	[ɦʊ̜ᵑɡak]	'much'	Only weakly rounded; typically transcribed in IPA with ⟨u⟩.
Slovak		ruka	[ˈru̞kä]	'arm'	Typically fully back. See Slovak phonology
Sotho		potso	[pʼʊ̠t͡sʼɔ]	'query'	Fully back; contrasts close, near-close and close-mid back rounded vowels. See Sotho phonology
Spanish	Eastern Andalusian	tus	[t̪ʊ̠ː]	'your' (pl.)	Fully back. Corresponds to [u] in other dialects, but in these dialects they are distinct. See Spanish phonology
Spanish	Murcian	tus	[t̪ʊ̠ː]	'your' (pl.)	Fully back. Corresponds to [u] in other dialects, but in these dialects they are distinct. See Spanish phonology
Turkish		buzlu	[buz̪ˈl̠ʊ]	'icy'	Allophone of /u/ described variously as "word-final" and "occurring in final open syllable of a phrase". See Turkish phonology
Ukrainian		Мусій	[mʊˈsij]	'Musiy' (name)	See Ukrainian phonology
Welsh		gẃraidd	[ɡʊ.raið]	'manly'	See Welsh phonology
Yoruba		lati sun	[lati sũ̟]	'to sleep'	Near-back or back; typically transcribed in IPA with ⟨ũ⟩. It is nasalized, and may be close [ũ̟ ~ ũ] instead.

== Near-close near-back compressed vowel ==
Near-close near-back compressed vowel

ʊ᫦

ɯ̽ᵝ

Some languages, such as Norwegian, are found with a near-close back vowel that has a distinct type of rounding, called compressed or exolabial.

As there are no diacritics in the IPA to distinguish protruded and compressed rounding, an old diacritic for labialization, ⟨◌᫦⟩ (the opposite of ⟨◌̫⟩), will be used here as an ad hoc symbol for compressed back vowels. It was only added to Unicode in 2025, however, and it may take some time for font support to catch up. Compression of the lips can be shown with the letter ⟨β̞⟩ as ⟨ɯ̽͡β̞⟩ (simultaneous [ɯ̽] and labial compression) or ⟨ɯ̽ᵝ⟩ ([ɯ̽] modified with labial compression), though that can suggest that the vowel is a diphthong.

Only the Shanghainese dialect is known to contrast this with the more typical protruded (endolabial) near-close back vowel, although the height of both of these vowels varies from close to close-mid.

The fully back variant of the near-close compressed vowel can be transcribed ⟨ɯ̞͡β̞⟩, ⟨ɯ̞ᵝ⟩ or ⟨u̞᫧⟩.

=== Features ===
- Its vowel height is near-close, also known as near-high, which means the tongue is not quite so constricted as a close vowel (high vowel).
- Its vowel backness is back, which means the tongue is positioned back in the mouth without creating a constriction that would be classified as a consonant.
- Its place of articulation is velar, which means it is articulated with the back of the tongue (the dorsum) at the soft palate.
- Its roundedness is compressed, which means that the margins of the lips are tense and drawn together in such a way that the inner surfaces are not exposed. The prototypical [ʊ] has a weak rounding (though it is protruded, rather than compressed), more like [ɔ] than the neighboring cardinal vowels.

=== Occurrence ===
Language		Word	IPA	Meaning	Notes
Chinese	Shanghainese	都	[tɯ̽ᵝ˩]	'capital'	The height varies between close and close-mid; contrasts with a close to close-mid back protruded vowel.
Japanese		空気 / kūki	[kʊ᫦ːki]	'air'	Allophone of /u/; central [ʉ̞᫧] for some younger speakers.
Norwegian		ond	[ɯ̞ᵝnː]	'evil'	Backness varies among dialects; it is a back vowel [ɯ̞ᵝ] in Urban East Norwegian, whereas in Stavangersk it is near-back [ɯ̽ᵝ]. The UEN vowel has also been described as close back [ɯᵝ]. See Norwegian phonology
Swedish	Central Standard	ort	[ɯ̽ᵝʈː]	'locality'	The quality has been variously described as near-close near-back [ɯ̽ᵝ], near-close back [ɯ̞ᵝ] and close back [ɯᵝ]. See Swedish phonology

== Notes ==
Place →	Labial					Coronal										Dorsal					Laryngeal			
Manner ↓	Bilabial		Labiodental		Linguolabial		Dental		Alveolar		Postalveolar		Retroflex		(Alveolo-)palatal		Velar		Uvular		Pharyngeal/epiglottal		Glottal	
Nasal	m̥	m	ɱ̊	ɱ		n̼	n̪̊	n̪	n̥	n	n̠̊	n̠	ɳ̊	ɳ	ɲ̊	ɲ	ŋ̊	ŋ	ɴ̥	ɴ				
Plosive	p	b	p̪	b̪	t̼	d̼	t̪	d̪	t	d			ʈ	ɖ	c	ɟ	k	ɡ	q	ɢ	ʡ		ʔ	
Sibilant affricate							t̪s̪	d̪z̪	ts	dz	t̠ʃ	d̠ʒ	tʂ	dʐ	tɕ	dʑ								
Non-sibilant affricate	pɸ	bβ	p̪f	b̪v			t̪θ	d̪ð	tɹ̝̊	dɹ̝	t̠ɹ̠̊˔	d̠ɹ̠˔			cç	ɟʝ	kx	ɡɣ	qχ	ɢʁ	ʡʜ	ʡʢ	ʔh	
Sibilant fricative							s̪	z̪	s	z	ʃ	ʒ	ʂ	ʐ	ɕ	ʑ								
Non-sibilant fricative	ɸ	β	f	v	θ̼	ð̼	θ	ð	θ̠	ð̠	ɹ̠̊˔	ɹ̠˔	ɻ̊˔	ɻ˔	ç	ʝ	x	ɣ	χ	ʁ	ħ	ʕ	h	ɦ
Approximant		β̞		ʋ				ð̞		ɹ		ɹ̠		ɻ		j		ɰ						˷
Tap/flap		ⱱ̟		ⱱ					ɾ̥	ɾ			ɽ̊	ɽ						ɢ̆		ʡ̆		
Trill	ʙ̥	ʙ							r̥	r		r̠	ɽ̊r̥	ɽr					ʀ̥	ʀ	ʜ	ʢ		
Lateral affricate									tɬ	dɮ			tꞎ	d𝼅	c𝼆	ɟʎ̝	k𝼄	ɡʟ̝						
Lateral fricative							ɬ̪		ɬ	ɮ			ꞎ	𝼅	𝼆	ʎ̝	𝼄	ʟ̝						
Lateral approximant								l̪	l̥	l		l̠	ɭ̊	ɭ	ʎ̥	ʎ	ʟ̥	ʟ		ʟ̠				
Lateral tap/flap									ɺ̥	ɺ			𝼈̊	𝼈		ʎ̆		ʟ̆						

		BL	LD	D	A	PA	RF	P	V	U
Implosive	Voiced	ɓ			ɗ		ᶑ	ʄ	ɠ	ʛ
Implosive	Voiceless	ɓ̥			ɗ̥		ᶑ̊	ʄ̊	ɠ̊	ʛ̥
Ejective	Stop	pʼ			tʼ		ʈʼ	cʼ	kʼ	qʼ
Ejective	Affricate		p̪fʼ	t̪θʼ	tsʼ	t̠ʃʼ	tʂʼ	tɕʼ	kxʼ	qχʼ
Ejective	Fricative	ɸʼ	fʼ	θʼ	sʼ	ʃʼ	ʂʼ	ɕʼ	xʼ	χʼ
Ejective	Lateral affricate				tɬʼ			c𝼆ʼ	k𝼄ʼ	q𝼄ʼ
Ejective	Lateral fricative				ɬʼ					
Click (top: velar; bottom: uvular)	Tenuis	kʘ qʘ		kǀ qǀ	kǃ qǃ		k𝼊 q𝼊	kǂ qǂ		
Click (top: velar; bottom: uvular)	Voiced	ɡʘ ɢʘ		ɡǀ ɢǀ	ɡǃ ɢǃ		ɡ𝼊 ɢ𝼊	ɡǂ ɢǂ		
Click (top: velar; bottom: uvular)	Nasal	ŋʘ ɴʘ		ŋǀ ɴǀ	ŋǃ ɴǃ		ŋ𝼊 ɴ𝼊	ŋǂ ɴǂ	ʞ	
Click (top: velar; bottom: uvular)	Tenuis lateral				kǁ qǁ					
Click (top: velar; bottom: uvular)	Voiced lateral				ɡǁ ɢǁ					
Click (top: velar; bottom: uvular)	Nasal lateral				ŋǁ ɴǁ					
