= Zane Radcliffe =

Writer from Northern Ireland

- Born: 1969 (age 56–57); Bangor, County Down, Northern Ireland
- Education: Queen's University Belfast
- Occupation: Novelist

Zane Radcliffe (born 1969 in Bangor, Northern Ireland) is an author from Northern Ireland.

== Early life ==
Radcliffe graduated from Queen's University Belfast in 1991. After graduation, he briefly worked as a journalist for M8. In 1994 he moved to London to study advertising for a year, after which he took a job as an advertising copyrighter. He spent the following six years writing commercials.

== Writing career ==
In 1974, he wrote his first short story, My Dog. In 2001, he wrote his first book, London Irish, which in 2003 won the W H Smith People’s Choice Award for New Talent. Six months later, he wrote his second novel, Big Jessie, and in 2005 wrote The Killer’s Guide to Iceland which is also published in Black Swan. Currently, he is a Creative Director at Newhaven, at an advertising agency.

== List of Works ==
- London Irish (2002)
- Big Jessie (2003)
- The Killer's Guide to Iceland (2005)
