= Richard Rowley (writer) =

Irish writer (1877–1947)

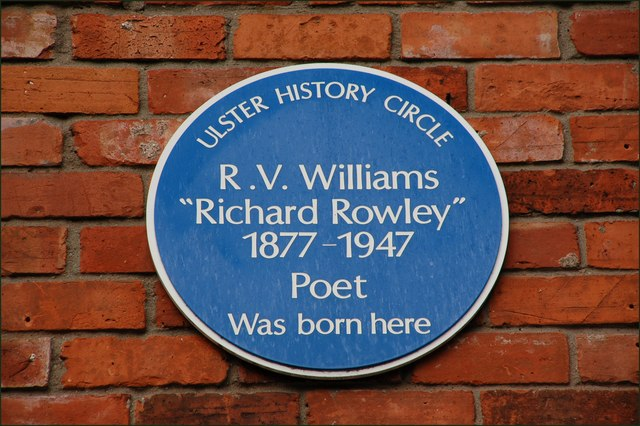
Blue plaque at Richard Rowley's birthplace in Belfast

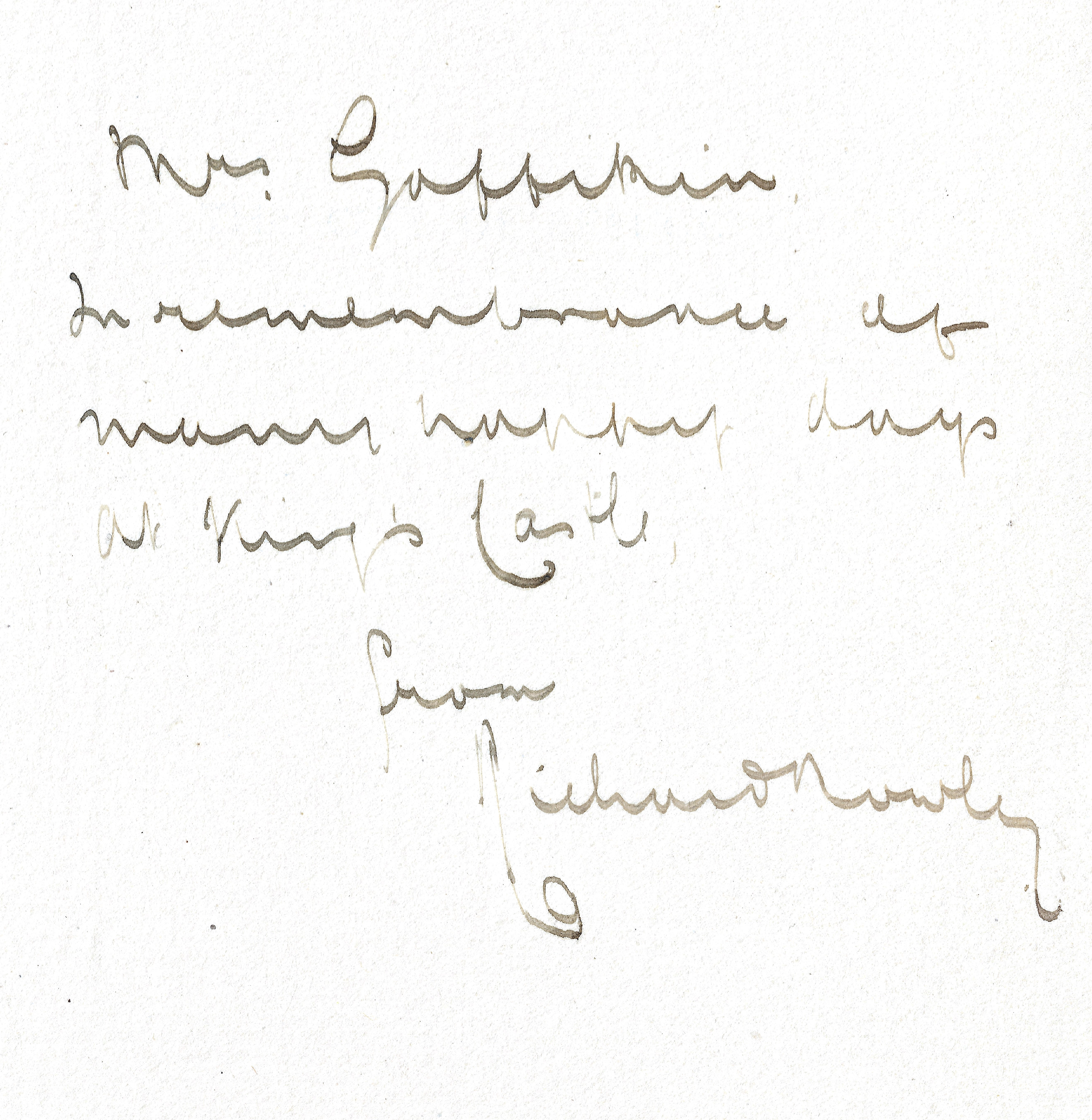
Handwritten note by Rowley: "In remembrance of many happy days at King's Castle". Inscribed within a first edition of 'The City of Refuge' (1917).

Richard Rowley was the pseudonym of Richard Valentine Williams (2 April 1877 – 25 April 1947), born in Belfast, Ireland, who wrote poetry, plays and stories.

== Early life ==
At the age of 16 he entered the family firm, McBride and Williams, which manufactured cotton handkerchiefs and eventually became its managing director. After the collapse of the company in 1931 he was Chairman of the Northern Ireland Unemployment Assistance Board. His early poems, in The City of Refuge (1917), were rhetorical celebrations of industry. His next volume, City Songs and Others (1918), included his most quoted poem The Islandmen, and is regarded as containing his most original work: "Browning-like monologues straight from the mouths of Belfast's working-class."

== Later life ==
He moved to Newcastle, County Down. He also wrote short stories: Tales of Mourne (1937), as well as at least one highly successful play, Apollo In Mourne (1926). During World War II, Rowley founded, and ran from his Newcastle home, the short-lived Mourne Press. He published first collections of Sam Hanna Bell and Michael McLaverty, but the press failed in 1942.

With Bell, Rowley was one of a set of Linen Hall Library members who would retire regularly to Campbell's Cafe. The regulars, at various points, included writers John Boyd and Denis Ireland, actors Joseph Tomelty, Jack Loudon and J.G. Devlin, poets John Hewitt and Robert Greacen, artists Padraic Woods, Gerald Dillon, and William Conor and (an outspoken opponent of sectarianism) the Rev. Arthur Agnew. The ebullient atmosphere the circle created was a backdrop the appearance of Campbell's Cafe in Brian Moore's wartime Bildungsroman, The Emperor of Ice-Cream.

Rowley died at Drumilly, County Armagh, in 1947. The poet's Newcastle home, Brook Cottage, has since been demolished. George MacCann and Jack Loudan presented a commemoration of Rowley's life on the radio in 1952. The programme used recordings of his friends Lady Mabel Annesley, who illustrated several of his publications, along with the poet John Irvine, the playwright Thomas Carnduff and William Conor. In Newcastle Rowley's name is remembered through the Rowley Meadows housing development and the Rowley Path, which runs along the southern boundary of the Islands Park.

== Works ==
- The City of Refuge and Other Poems (1917)
- City Songs and Others (1918)
- Workers (1923)
- County Down Songs (1924)
- The Old Gods and Other Poems (1925)
- Apollo In Mourne (1926) (play)
- Selected Poems (1931)
- Tales of Mourne (1937) (short stories)
- Ballads of Mourne (1940)
- One Cure for Sorrow and Other One-Act Plays (1942)
- Sonnets for Felicity (1942)
- The Piper of Mourne (1944)
- Final Harvest (1951)

== See also ==
- List of Northern Irish writers
- Price, Victor., (1978) Apollo in Mourne: poems, plays & stories by Richard Rowley, Blackstaff Press, Belfast
