= The Honest Ulsterman =

Northern Irish magazine

The Honest Ulsterman is a long-running Northern Ireland literary magazine that was established by James Simmons in 1968. It was edited for twenty years by Frank Ormsby. The original printed edition stopped in 2003. It has returned as an online publication from 2014 onwards.

== Original Printed Edition ==
The magazine was published, with decreasing frequency, from May 1968 until Summer 2003 and so was one of the longest-lived and most widely read little magazines of its type in Ireland, and probably in the English-speaking world.

From the start it presented Northern Irish writers alongside poets, prose-writers and critics from around the world. Early issues included work by Stevie Smith and Tony Harrison, as well as by Gavin Ewart, who continued to contribute until his death. It went on to include work from all parts of Ireland and Britain, the USA and Canada, Australia and many other places. Its beginning coincided with the emergence of a remarkable generation of poets, including Seamus Heaney, Michael Longley and Derek Mahon, but it also provided an early, often the first, platform for subsequent waves of writers such as Paul Muldoon, Ciaran Carson, Medbh McGuckian, and numerous others.

A distinctive part of every issue from number 29 (July/August 1971) until the end was the "Business Section" by "Jude the Obscure" (Gerrard Keenan, previously a contributor to Patrick Kavanagh's Kavanagh's Weekly), a free-ranging look at culture high and low, Irish, French and American. The "Business Section" was also used to serialise Jude the Obscure's novella "Farset and Gomorrah" and other prose pieces. Another notable contributor was John Morrow, whose comic prose pieces developed into satirical novels and short-story collections. Another aspect was literature in translation, particularly from Russian, Spanish, French and Chinese. Issues 82-86 included a section edited by John Wilson Foster, "Critical Forum". Frankie Sewell (associate editor, issues 99-110) oversaw a section in the Irish language.

== Poetry pamphlets ==
A series of over 30 poetry pamphlets were published along with the magazine itself, including work by Heaney, Mahon, Muldoon, McGuckian, Foley, Ormsby, Carson, Johnstone, Ewart, Tom Paulin, Carol Rumens, Iain Crichton Smith, Sean O'Brien, Geoffrey Squires, Harry Clifton, Tom Matthews and others.

== Editors ==
- Issues 1-11 and 14-19: James Simmons
- Issue 12: Michael Stephens, guest editor
- Issue 13: Michael Foley guest-editor
- Issue 20-34: Michael Foley and Frank Ormsby
- Issues 35-74: Frank Ormsby
- Issues 75-86: Frank Ormsby and Robert Johnstone
- Issues 87-95: Robert Johnstone, Ruth Hooley (later Ruth Carr) and Tom Clyde for issues 94 and 95:
- Issues 96-110: Tom Clyde, Ruth Carr and, from 99-110, Frank Sewell.
- Issue 111 (final print issue): Ruth Carr and Tom Clyde.

== Revived Online Edition ==
It was revived in 2014 by the Verbal Arts Centre in Derry which appointed Darran Anderson as Editor, who edited three online issues. It is currently edited by Gregory McCartney.

== See also ==
- List of literary magazines
