= James Fenton (Ulster Scots poet) =

Northern Irish poet (1931–2021)

James Fenton (5 June 1931 – 3 February 2021) was a linguist and poet who wrote in Ulster Scots.

== Biography ==
He grew up in Drumdarragh and in Ballinaloob, County Antrim. His home language of childhood was Ulster Scots. Educated at Stranmillis College in Belfast, and later Queen's University, he became a teacher at schools in Belfast.

His poetry in Ulster Scots, at times lively, contented, wistful, was written in contemporary Ulster Scots, and particularly the dialect of Ballinaloob ("Belnaloob" in his poem Thonner an Thon).

== Books ==
James Fenton's record and study of Scots and Scots words used in Ulster, The Hamely Tongue has been published by the Ullans Press. A collection of his own poetry has been published by the Ullans Press too; Thonner an Thon.

James Fenton lived in Glengormley, Newtownabbey.

== Death ==
Fenton died on 3 February 2021, aged 89.
