= Hugh Porter (poet) =

Ulster Scots dialects poet

Hugh Porter (1780–1812) was an Ulster Scots dialects poet and weaver. He was known as the Bard of Moneyslane, a village in County Down.

Porter started writing poetry as a teenager, although he likely had little formal education. In 1799, he dedicated a poem to his patron Reverend Thomas Tighe, who supported several local writers including Patrick Brontë. Tighe was a friend of the translator Reverend Henry Boyd, and was part of the Dromore literary circle with Thomas Percy.

In the 1800s, Porter's work was published in several newspapers under the pseudonym "A County Down Weaver" and "Tisander". In 1813, Poetical Attempts (1813), a volume of his work, was published "to exhilarate the evening of the author's life" with funds raised by Tighe.
