= Frank Ormsby =

Northern Irish author and poet (born 1947)

Francis Arthur Ormsby (born 1947) is an author and poet from Northern Ireland.

== Life ==
Frank Ormsby was born in Irvinestown, County Fermanagh. He was educated at St Michael's College, Enniskillen and then Queen's University Belfast.

From 1976 until his retirement in 2010, he was Head of English at the Royal Belfast Academical Institution.

== Work ==
Over a period of fifty years he has published ten books of poetry and has also edited another ten collections.

From 1969 to 1989 he was editor of The Honest Ulsterman. He has also edited the Poetry Ireland Review.

Ormsby was appointed as the Ireland Professor of Poetry in 2019, to serve a three-year term between Trinity College Dublin, Queen's University Belfast and University College Dublin.

== Bibliography ==
=== Poetry collections ===
- Ormsby, Frank (2026). The Tumbling Paddy. Hexham: Bloodaxe Books. ISBN 978-1-943667-22-2.
- Ormsby, Frank (2019). The Rain Barrel. Hexham: Bloodaxe Books. ISBN 978-1780374925.
- Ormsby, Frank (2017). The Darkness of Snow. Hexham: Bloodaxe Books. ISBN 978-1780373669.
- Ormsby, Frank (2015). Goat's Milk: New and Selected Poems. Hexham: Bloodaxe Books. ISBN 978-1780371252.
- Ormsby, Frank (2009). Fireflies. Oxford: OxfordPoets.
- Ormsby, Frank (2000). The Hip Flask: Short poems from Ireland. Belfast: Blackstaff. ISBN 978-0856406812.
- Ormsby, Frank (1995). The Ghost Train. Oldcastle, Co. Meath: Gallery Press. ISBN 978-1852351731.
- Ormsby, Frank (1986). A Northern Spring. Oldcastle, Co. Meath: Gallery. ISBN 978-0904011937.
- Ormsby, Frank (1977). A Store of Candles. Oldcastle, Co. Meath: Gallery Press. ISBN 978-0904011999.
- Ormsby, Frank (1978). Being Walked by a Dog. Belfast: Ulsterman.
- Ormsby, Frank (1971). Ripe for company. Belfast: Ulsterman Publications.

=== Edited volumes ===
- Ormsby, Frank, ed. (1979). Poets from the north of Ireland. Belfast: Blackstaff Press.
- Northern Windows: An Anthology of Ulster Autobiography, Belfast: Blackstaff Press, 1987.
- The Long Embrace: Twentieth Century Irish Love Poems, London: Faber & Faber, 1987.
- Thine in Storm and Calm: An Amanda McKittrick Ros Reader, Belfast: Blackstaff Press, 1988.
- —, ed. (1990). Poets from the north of Ireland. Revised ed. Belfast: Blackstaff Press..
- The Collected Poems of John Hewitt, Belfast: Blackstaff Press, 1991.
- A Rage for Order: Poetry of the Northern Ireland Troubles, Belfast: Blackstaff Press, 1992.
- The Hip Flask: Short Poems from Ireland, Belfast: Blackstaff Press, 2001.
- The Blackbird's Nest: An Anthology of Poetry from Queen's University Belfast, Belfast: Blackstaff Press, 2006.
- The Selected Poems of John Hewitt (co-edited with Michael Longley), Belfast: Blackstaff Press, 2007.

=== Recordings ===
- the kiss of light, Frank Ormsby, Anthony Toner, Neil Martin, Linley Hamilton. Frank Ormsby reads his poems followed in each case by a musical composition inspired by the poems. Dozens of Cousins CD.

== Prizes and awards ==
- 2002 - Lawrence O’Shaughnessy Award for Poetry, University of Saint Thomas, St. Paul, Minnesota
- 1992 - Cultural Traditions Award, given in memory of John Hewitt,
- 1977 - Store of Candles, Choice of the British Poetry Book Society

== See also ==
- List of Northern Irish writers
