= Gerald J. Tate =

Northern Irish horror writer (born 1954)

- Born: 6 February 1954 (age 72); Belfast, Northern Ireland
- Occupations: Horror writer, Aircraft engineer
- Notable work: Cappawhite, Beyond the Forest's Edge, Hot Sand, Cool Sea, From Sparta

Gerald J Tate (born 6 February 1954, Belfast) is a Northern Irish horror writer, who is also an aircraft engineer.

== Writings ==
His first book, Cappawhite, was released in 2006, and re-edited in 2009. Director Ron Howard was in talks with the author from 2007. It was hoped Cappawhite would be made into a movie.

His second book, Beyond the Forest's Edge, was the follow-up, with both books winning Editors Choice, Book of the year Awards for 2007 & 2008 with Allbooks review of Canada. He then brought out Hot Sand, Cool Sea, an anthology of short stories. His book From Sparta, was released on Oct 2009. From Sparta has been short-listed for Book of the year 2010 with Spinetinglers publishing.

The final part of the Cappawhite trilogy, Dead Village was published in 2011. He also has a short story in the published Spinetinglers anthology 2009, titled "When the Dead Call".

He has also written a variety of children's stories which will be coming to publication soon. The Farmyard Buddy volumes will have a collection of a dozen safety stories for children aged 7–11. He also writes poetry, and has a collection of over 100 poems which he has released on the Authorsden site.

== Bibliography ==
- Cappawhite (ISBN 1906755027, 2006)
- Beyond the Forest's Edge Cappawhite II (ISBN 1846670276, 2007)
- Hot Sand, Cool Sea: a Collection of Short Stories (ISBN 1846670284, 2007)
- From Sparta (ISBN 144014852X, 2009)
- Dead Village, Cappawhite III
