= Ulster Scots dialect =

Scots as spoken in Ulster, Ireland

Ulster Scots
- Ulstèr-Scotch; Ullans (Braid) Scots; Scotch
- Region: Ulster, Ireland
- Ethnicity: Ulster Scots
- Language family: Indo-European: Germanic; West Germanic; North Sea Germanic; Anglo-Frisian; Anglic; Anglian; North Anglic; Ulster Scots
- Early forms: Proto-English: Northumbrian Old English; Early Middle English; Early Scots; Middle Scots
- Dialects: Glenoe

Official status
- Recognised minority language in: Northern Ireland
- Regulated by: The cross-border Boord o Ulstèr-Scotch, established as a result of the Good Friday Agreement

Language codes
- ISO 639-3: –
- Glottolog: ulst1239
- Linguasphere: 52-ABA-aa (varieties: 52-ABA-aar to -aat)
- IETF: sco-ulster
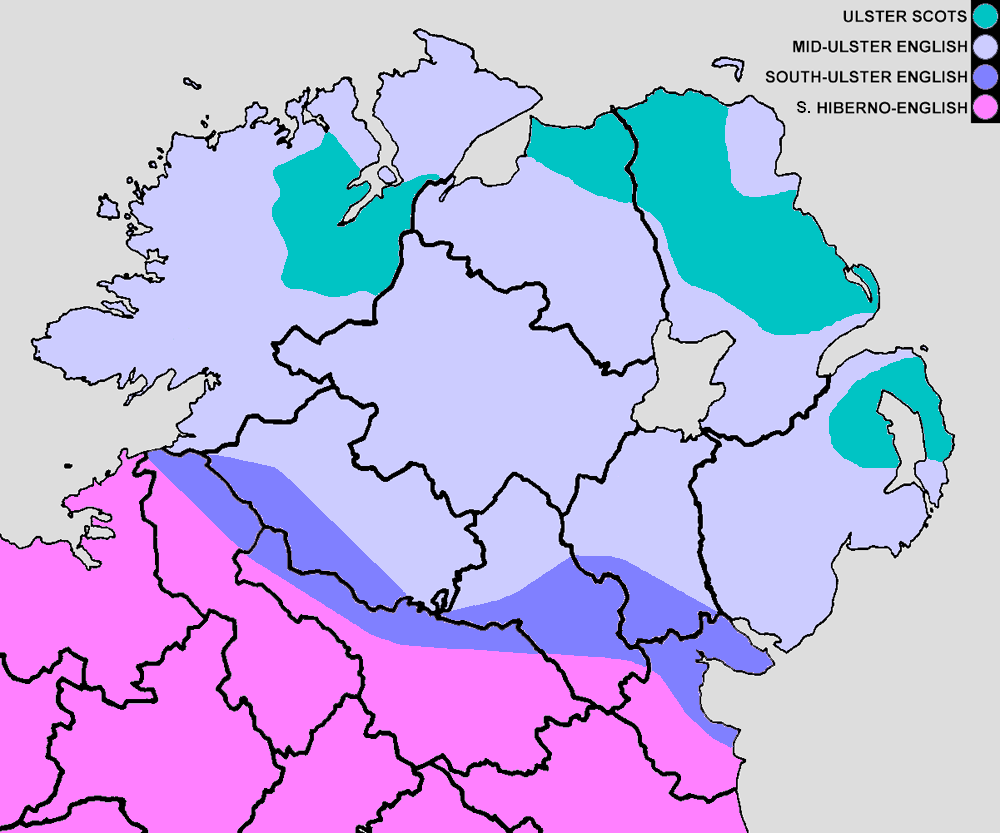
- Approximate boundaries of the traditional Scots language areas in Ulster, shaded in turquoise ■. Based on The Scotch-Irish Dialect Boundaries in Ulster (1972) by R. J. Gregg.

Ulster Scots or Ulster-Scots (Ulstèr-Scotch; Irish: Ultais) also known as Ulster Scotch and Ullans, is the dialect of Scots spoken in parts of Ulster, being almost exclusively spoken in parts of Northern Ireland and County Donegal. It is normally considered a dialect or group of dialects of Scots, although groups such as the Ulster-Scots Language Society and Ulster-Scots Academy consider it a language in its own right, and the Ulster-Scots Agency and former Department of Culture, Arts and Leisure have used the term Ulster-Scots language.

Some definitions of Ulster Scots may also include Standard English spoken with an Ulster Scots accent. This is a situation like that of Lowland Scots and Scottish Standard English with words pronounced using the Ulster Scots phonemes closest to those of Standard English. Ulster Scots has been influenced by Hiberno-English, particularly Ulster English, and by Ulster Irish. As a result of the competing influences of English and Scots, varieties of Ulster Scots can be described as "more English" or "more Scots".

== Names ==
While once referred to as Scotch-Irish by several researchers, that has now been superseded by the term Ulster Scots. Speakers usually refer to their vernacular as 'Big Scots', 'Scotch' or 'the hamely tongue'. Since the 1980s Ullans, a neologism popularized by the physician, amateur historian and politician Ian Adamson, merging Ulster and Lallans, the Scots for Lowlands, but also an acronym for "Ulster-Scots language in literature and native speech" and Ulstèr-Scotch, the preferred revivalist parlance, have also been used. Occasionally, the term Habitual-Scots appears, whether for the vernacular or the ethnic group.

== Speaker population and spread ==
During the middle of the 20th century, the linguist Robert John Gregg established the geographical boundaries of Ulster's Scots-speaking areas based on information gathered from native speakers. By his definition, Ulster Scots is spoken in mid and east Antrim, north Down, north-east County Londonderry, and in the fishing villages of the Mourne coast. It is also spoken in the Laggan district and parts of the Finn Valley in east Donegal and in the south of Inishowen in north Donegal. Writing in 2020, the Fintona-born linguist Warren Maguire argued that some of the criteria that Gregg used as distinctive of Ulster Scots are common in south-west Tyrone and were found in other sites across Northern Ireland investigated by the Linguistic Survey of Scotland.

The proportion of respondents in the 2011 census in Northern Ireland aged 3 and above who stated that they could speak Ulster Scots

The 1999 Northern Ireland Life and Times Survey found that 2% of Northern Ireland residents claimed to speak Ulster Scots, which would mean a total speech community of approximately 30,000 in the territory. Other estimates range from 35,000 in Northern Ireland, to an "optimistic" total of 100,000 including the Republic of Ireland (mainly the east of County Donegal). Speaking at a seminar on 9 September 2004, Ian Sloan of the Northern Ireland Department of Culture, Arts and Leisure (DCAL) accepted that the 1999 Northern Ireland Life and Times Survey "did not significantly indicate that unionists or nationalists were relatively any more or less likely to speak Ulster Scots, although in absolute terms there were more unionists who spoke Ulster Scots than nationalists".

In the 2021 census of Northern Ireland, 20,930 people (1.14% of the population) stated that they can speak, read, write and understand Ulster Scots, 26,570 people (1.45% of the population) stated they can speak but cannot read or write Ulster Scots, and 190,613 people (10.38% of the population) reported having some knowledge of it.

== Status ==
=== Linguistic status ===
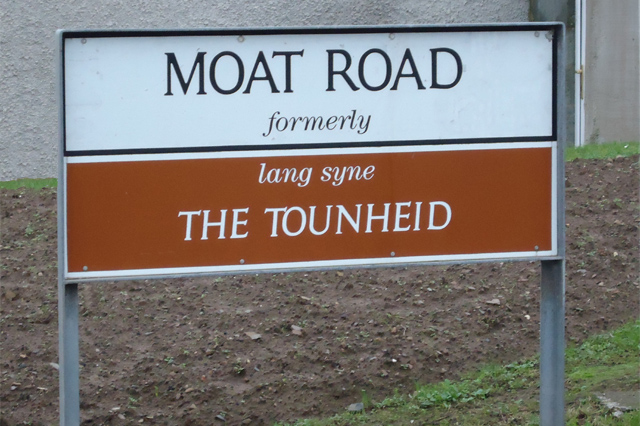
A bilingual street sign in Ballyhalbert, County Down

The majority of linguists treat Ulster Scots as a variety of the Scots language; Caroline Macafee, for example, writes that "Ulster Scots is [...] clearly a dialect of Central Scots." The Northern Ireland Department of Culture, Arts and Leisure considers Ulster Scots to be "the local variety of the Scots language." Some linguists, such as Raymond Hickey, treat Ulster Scots (and other forms of Scots) as a dialect of English. It has been said that its "status varies between dialect and language".

Enthusiasts such as Philip Robinson (author of Ulster-Scots: a Grammar of the Traditional Written and Spoken Language), the Ulster-Scots Language Society and supporters of an Ulster-Scots Academy are of the opinion that Ulster Scots is a language in its own right. That position has been criticised by the Ulster-Scots Agency, with a BBC report stating: "[The Agency] accused the academy of wrongly promoting Ulster-Scots as a language distinct from Scots." This position is reflected in many of the academic responses to the "Public Consultation on Proposals for an Ulster-Scots Academy".

=== Legal status ===
Ulster Scots is defined in an Agreement between the Government of the United Kingdom of Great Britain and Northern Ireland and the Government of Ireland establishing implementation bodies done at Dublin on the 8th day of March 1999 in the following terms:

"Ullans" is to be understood as the variety of the Scots language traditionally found in parts of Northern Ireland and Donegal.

The North/South Co-operation (Implementation Bodies) Northern Ireland Order 1999, which gave effect to the implementation bodies, incorporated the text of the agreement in its Schedule 1.

The declaration made by the British Government regarding the European Charter for Regional or Minority Languages reads as follows:

The United Kingdom declares, in accordance with Article 2, paragraph 1 of the Charter that it recognises that Scots and Ulster Scots meet the Charter's definition of a regional or minority language for the purposes of Part II of the Charter.

This recognition differed significantly from the commitments entered into under the Charter in relation to Irish, for which specific provisions under Part III were invoked for the protection and promotion of that language. The definition of Ullans from the North/South Co-operation (Implementation Bodies) Northern Ireland Order 1999 above was used on 1 July 2005 Second Periodical Report by the United Kingdom to the Secretary General of the Council of Europe outlining how the UK met its obligations under the Charter.

The Good Friday Agreement (which does not refer to Ulster Scots as a "language") recognises Ulster Scots as "part of the cultural wealth of the island of Ireland", and the Implementation Agreement established the cross-border Ulster-Scots Agency (Tha Boord o Ulstèr-Scotch).

The legislative remit laid down for the agency by the North/South Co-operation (Implementation Bodies) Northern Ireland Order 1999 is: "the promotion of greater awareness and the use of Ullans and of Ulster-Scots cultural issues, both within Northern Ireland and throughout the island".

The agency has adopted a mission statement: to promote the study, conservation, development and use of Ulster Scots as a living language; to encourage and develop the full range of its attendant culture; and to promote an understanding of the history of the Ulster-Scots people. Despite the Agency's reference to Ulster Scots as "a language", this eliding of the distinction between Ulster Scots as a linguistic form, and "Ulster Scots culture" broadly referring to cultural forms associated with the Scottish-descended population, continued thereafter.

The Northern Ireland (St Andrews Agreement) Act 2006 amended the Northern Ireland Act 1998 to insert a section (28D) entitled Strategies relating to Irish language and Ulster Scots language etc. which among other things laid on the Executive Committee a duty to "adopt a strategy setting out how it proposes to enhance and develop the Ulster Scots language, heritage and culture." This reflects the wording used in the St Andrews Agreement to refer to the enhancement and development of "the Ulster Scots language, heritage and culture". There is still controversy on the status of Ulster Scots.

== History and literature ==
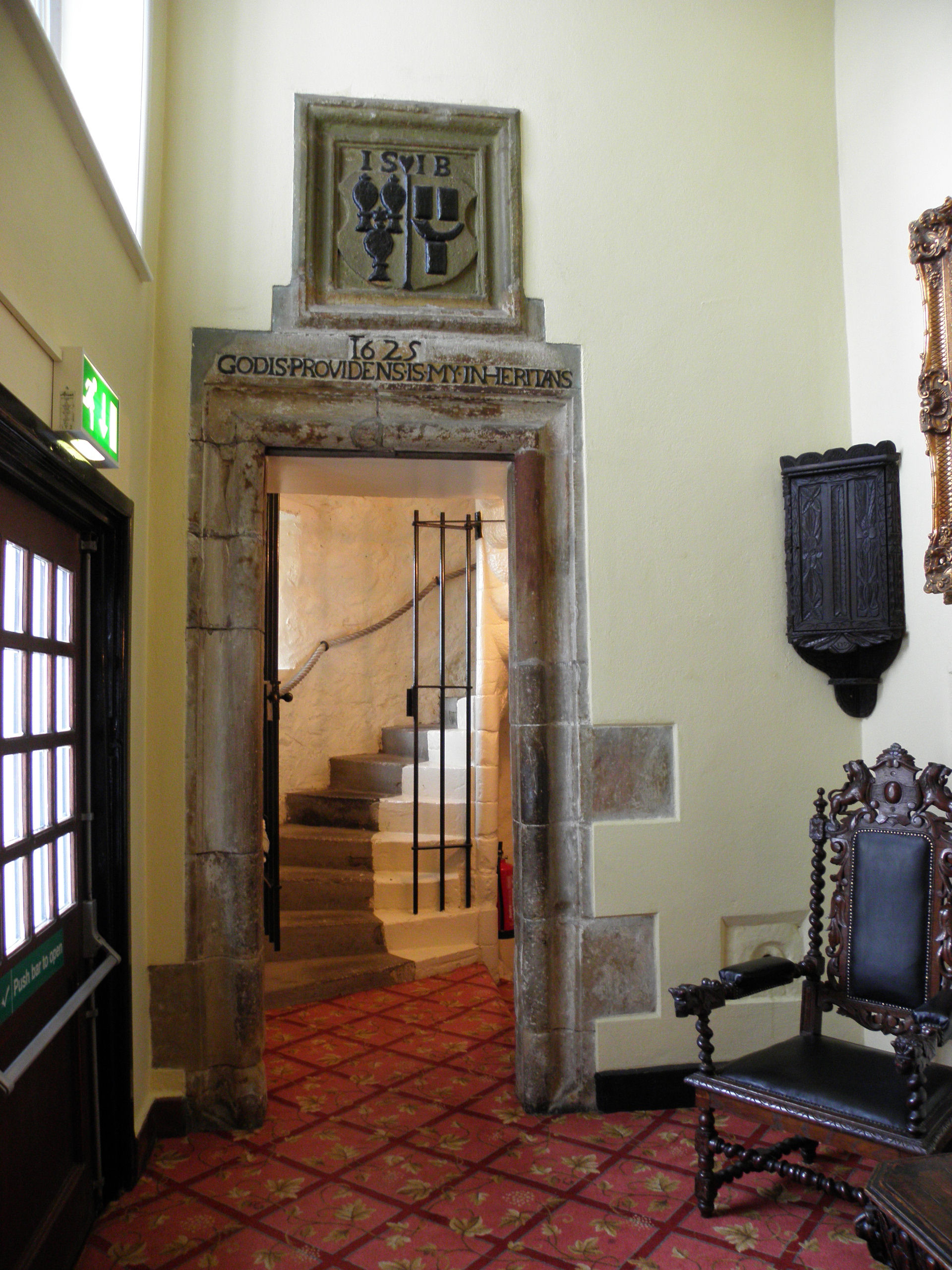
Middle Scots inscription "Godis Providens Is My Inheritans" over the main entrance door leading to the tower in Ballygally Castle

A large numbers of Scots-speaking Lowlanders, some 200,000, arrived during the 17th century following the 1610 Plantation, with the peak reached during the 1690s. In the core areas of Scots settlement, Scots outnumbered English settlers by five or six to one.

Literature from shortly before the end of the unselfconscious tradition at the turn of the 19th and 20th centuries is almost identical with contemporary writing from Scotland. W. G. Lyttle, writing in Paddy McQuillan's Trip Tae Glesco, uses the typically Scots forms kent and begood, now replaced in Ulster by the more mainstream Anglic forms knew, knowed or knawed and begun. Many of the modest contemporary differences between Scots as spoken in Scotland and Ulster may be due to dialect levelling and influence from Mid Ulster English brought about through relatively recent demographic change rather than direct contact with Irish, retention of older features or separate development.

The earliest identified writing in Scots in Ulster dates from 1571: a letter from Agnes Campbell of County Tyrone to Queen Elizabeth on behalf of Turlough O'Neil, her husband. Although documents dating from the Plantation period show conservative Scots features, English forms started to predominate from the 1620s as Scots declined as a written medium.

In Ulster Scots-speaking areas there was traditionally a considerable demand for the work of Scottish poets, often in locally printed editions. These include Alexander Montgomerie's The Cherrie and the Slae in 1700; shortly over a decade later an edition of poems by Sir David Lindsay; nine printings of Allan Ramsay's The Gentle shepherd between 1743 and 1793; and an edition of Robert Burns' poetry in 1787, the same year as the Edinburgh edition, followed by reprints in 1789, 1793 and 1800. Among other Scottish poets published in Ulster were James Hogg and Robert Tannahill.

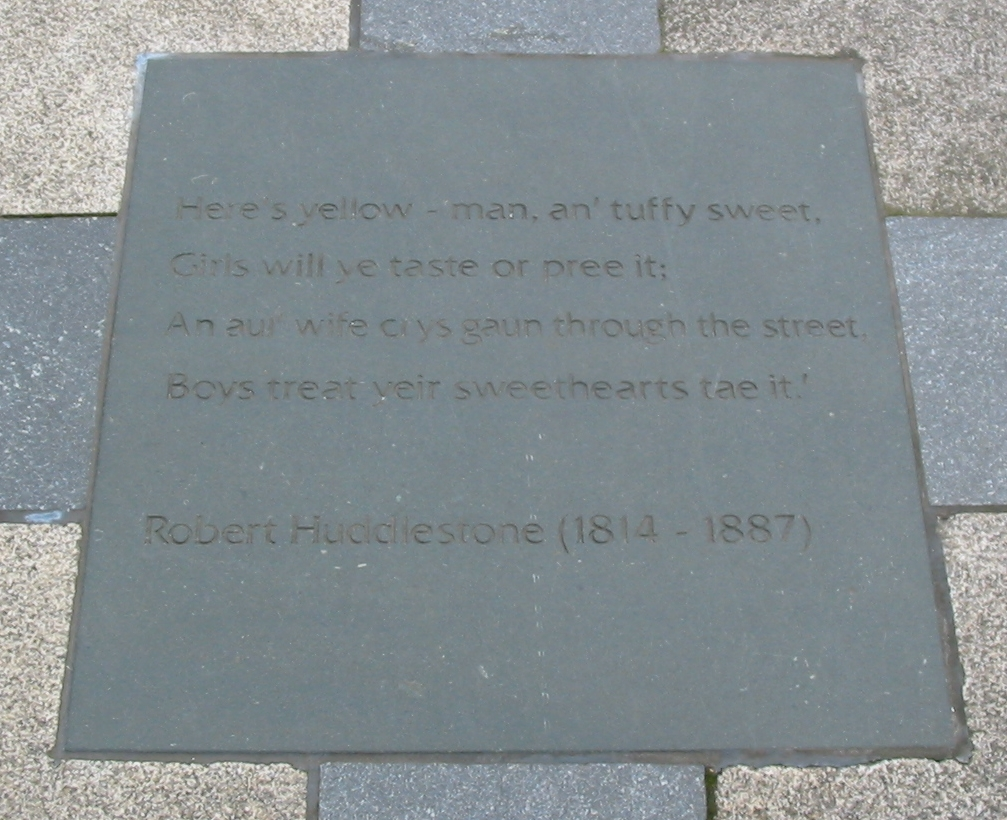
Poetry by Robert Huddlestone (1814–1887) inscribed in paving in Writers' Square, Belfast

That was complemented by a poetry revival and nascent prose genre in Ulster, which started around 1720. The most prominent of these was the rhyming weaver poetry, of which, some 60 to 70 volumes were published between 1750 and 1850, the peak being in the decades 1810 to 1840, although the first printed poetry (in the Habbie stanza form) by an Ulster Scots writer was published in a broadsheet in Strabane in 1735. These weaver poets looked to Scotland for their cultural and literary models and were not simple imitators but clearly inheritors of the same literary tradition following the same poetic and orthographic practices; it is not always immediately possible to distinguish traditional Scots writing from Scotland and Ulster. Among the rhyming weavers were James Campbell (1758–1818), James Orr (1770–1816), Thomas Beggs (1749–1847), David Herbison (1800–1880), Hugh Porter (1780–1839) and Andrew McKenzie (1780–1839).

Scots was also used in the narrative by Ulster novelists such as W. G. Lyttle (1844–1896) and Archibald McIlroy (1860–1915). By the middle of the 19th century, the Kailyard school of prose had become the dominant literary genre, overtaking poetry. This was a tradition shared with Scotland which continued into the early 20th century. Scots also frequently appeared in Ulster newspaper columns, especially in Antrim and Down, in the form of pseudonymous social commentary employing a folksy first-person style. The pseudonymous Bab M'Keen (probably successive members of the Weir family: John Weir, William Weir, and Jack Weir) provided comic commentaries in the Ballymena Observer and County Antrim Advertiser for over a hundred years from the 1880s.

A somewhat diminished tradition of vernacular poetry survived into the 20th century in the work of poets such as Adam Lynn, author of the 1911 collection Random Rhymes frae Cullybackey, John Stevenson (died 1932), writing as "Pat M'Carty", and John Clifford (1900–1983) from East Antrim. In the late 20th century the poetic tradition was revived, albeit often replacing the traditional Modern Scots orthographic practice with a series of contradictory idiolects. Among the significant writers is James Fenton, mostly using a blank verse form, but also occasionally the Habbie stanza. He employs an orthography that presents the reader with the difficult combination of eye dialect, dense Scots, and a greater variety of verse forms than employed hitherto. The poet Michael Longley (born 1939) has experimented with Ulster Scots for the translation of Classical verse, as in his 1995 collection The Ghost Orchid. The writing of Philip Robinson (born 1946) has been described as verging on "post-modern kailyard". He has produced a trilogy of novels Wake the Tribe o Dan (1998), The Back Streets o the Claw (2000) and The Man frae the Ministry (2005), as well as story books for children Esther, Quaen o tha Ulidian Pechts and Fergus an tha Stane o Destinie, and two volumes of poetry Alang the Shore (2005) and Oul Licht, New Licht (2009).

A team in Belfast has begun translating portions of the Bible into Ulster Scots. The Gospel of Luke was published in 2009 by the Ullans Press. It is available in the YouVersion Bible Project.

=== Since the 1990s ===
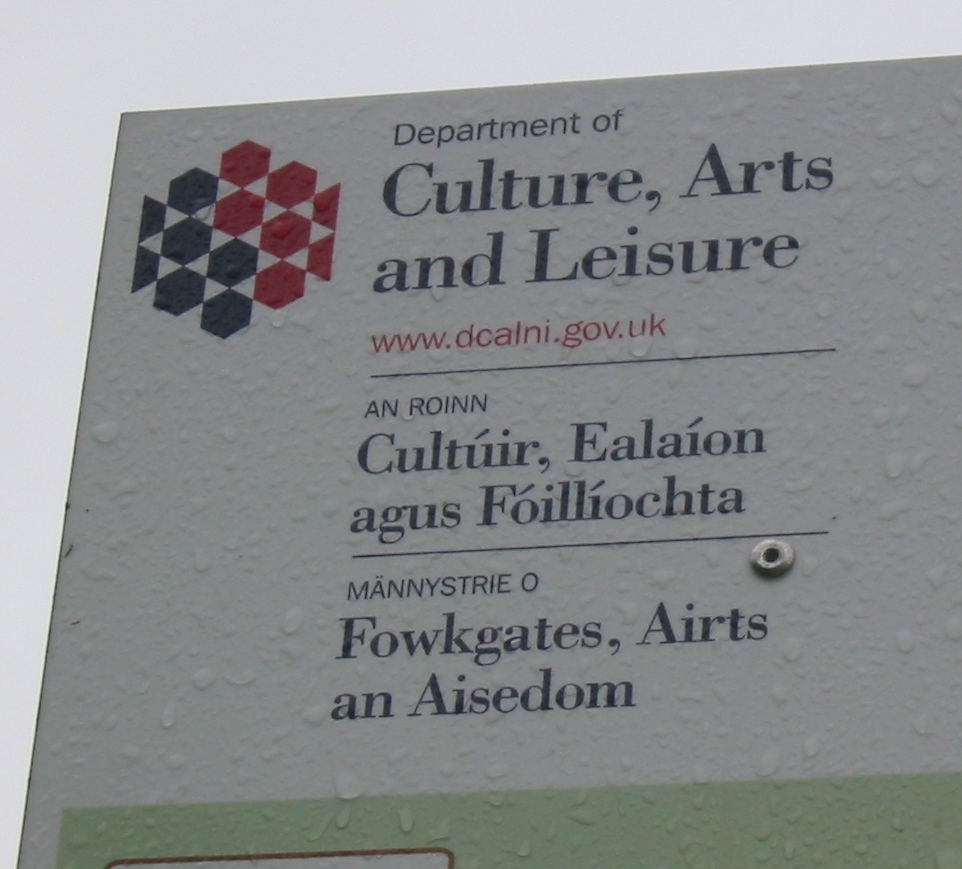
A sign for the Northern Ireland Department of Culture, Arts and Leisure. It shows the Irish translation (middle) and a translation in a form of Ulster Scots (bottom).

In 1992 the Ulster-Scots Language Society was formed for the protection and promotion of Ulster Scots, which some of its members viewed as a language in its own right, encouraging use in speech, writing and in all areas of life.

Within the terms of the European Charter for Regional or Minority Languages the British Government is obliged, among other things, to:

- Facilitate and/or encourage of the use of Scots in speech and writing, in public and private life.
- Provide appropriate forms and means for the teaching and study of the language at all appropriate stages.
- Provide facilities enabling non-speakers living where the language is spoken to learn it if they so desire.
- Promote study and research of the language at universities of equivalent institutions.

The Ulster-Scots Agency, funded by DCAL in conjunction with the Department of Culture, Heritage and the Gaeltacht, is responsible for promotion of greater awareness and use of Ullans and of Ulster-Scots cultural issues, both within Northern Ireland and throughout the island. The agency was established as a result of the Belfast Agreement of 1998. Its headquarters are on Great Victoria Street in central Belfast, while the agency has a major office in Raphoe, County Donegal.

In 2001 the Institute of Ulster Scots Studies was established at the University of Ulster.

An Ulster Scots Academy has been planned with the aim of conserving, developing, and teaching the language of Ulster-Scots in association with native speakers to the highest academic standards.

The 2010 documentary The Hamely Tongue by filmmaker Deaglán O Mocháin traces back the origins of this culture and language, and relates its manifestations in today's Ireland.

==== New orthographies ====
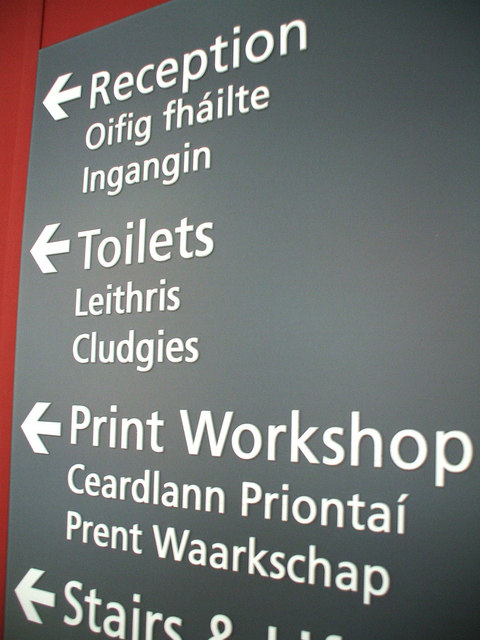
A trilingual sign at Strule Arts Centre in Omagh showing English, Irish (middle) and a form of Ulster Scots (bottom)

By the early 20th century the literary tradition was almost extinct, though some 'dialect' poetry continued to be written. Much revivalist Ulster Scots has appeared, for example as "official translations", since the 1990s. However, it has little in common with traditional Scots orthography as described in Grant and Dixon's Manual of Modern Scots (1921). Aodán Mac Póilin, an Irish language activist, has described these revivalist orthographies as an attempt to make Ulster Scots an independent written language and to achieve official status. They seek "to be as different to English (and occasionally Scots) as possible". He described it as a hotchpotch of obsolete words, neologisms (example: stour-sucker for vacuum cleaner), redundant spellings (example: qoho for who) and "erratic spelling". This spelling "sometimes reflects everyday Ulster Scots speech rather than the conventions of either modern or historic Scots, and sometimes does not". The result, Mac Póilin writes, is "often incomprehensible to the native speaker". In 2000, John Kirk described the "net effect" of that "amalgam of traditional, surviving, revived, changed, and invented features" as an "artificial dialect". He added,

It is certainly not a written version of the vestigial spoken dialect of rural County Antrim, as its activists frequently urge, perpetrating the fallacy that it's wor ain leid. (Besides, the dialect revivalists claim not to be native speakers of the dialect themselves!) The colloquialness of this new dialect is deceptive, for it is neither spoken nor innate. Traditional dialect speakers find it counter-intuitive and false...

In 2005, Gavin Falconer questioned officialdom's complicity, writing: "The readiness of Northern Ireland officialdom to consign taxpayers' money to a black hole of translations incomprehensible to ordinary users is worrying". Recently produced teaching materials, have, on the other hand, been evaluated more positively.

=== Sample texts ===
The three text excerpts below illustrate how the traditional written form of Ulster Scots from the 18th to early 20th century was virtually indistinguishable from contemporary written Scots from Scotland.

The Muse Dismissed (Hugh Porter 1780–1839)

Be hush'd my Muse, ye ken the morn
Begins the shearing o' the corn,
Whar knuckles monie a risk maun run,
An' monie a trophy's lost an' won,
Whar sturdy boys wi' might and main
Shall camp, till wrists an' thumbs they strain,
While pithless, pantin' wi' the heat,
They bathe their weazen'd pelts in sweat
To gain a sprig o' fading fame,
Before they taste the dear-bought cream—
But bide ye there, my pens an' papers,
For I maun up, an' to my scrapers—
Yet, min', my lass— ye maun return
This very night we cut the churn.

To M.H. (Barney Maglone 1820?–1875)

This wee thing's o' little value,

But for a' that it may be

Guid eneuch to gar you, lassie,

When you read it, think o' me.

Think o' whan we met and parted,

And o' a' we felt atween—

Whiles sae gleesome, whiles doon-hearted—

In yon cosy neuk at e'en.

Think o' when we dander't

Doon by Bangor and the sea;

How yon simmer day, we wander't

'Mang the fields o' Isle Magee.

Think o' yon day's gleefu' daffin'

(Weel I wot ye mind it still)

Whan we had sic slips and lauchin',

Spielin' daftly up Cave Hill.

Dinna let your e'en be greetin'

Lassie, whan ye think o' me,

Think upo' anither meetin',

Aiblins by a lanward sea.

From The Lammas Fair (Robert Huddleston 1814–1889)

Tae sing the day, tae sing the fair,

That birkies ca' the lammas;

In aul' Belfast, that toun sae rare,

Fu' fain wad try't a gomas.

Tae think tae please a', it were vain,

And for a country plain boy;

Therefore, tae please mysel' alane,

Thus I began my ain way,

Tae sing that day.

Ae Monday morn on Autumn's verge

To view a scene so gay,

I took my seat beside a hedge,

To loiter by the way.

Lost Phoebus frae the clouds o' night,

Ance mair did show his face—

Ance mair the Emerald Isle got light,

Wi' beauty, joy, an' grace;

Fu' nice that day.

The examples below illustrate how 21st century Ulster Scots texts seldom adhere to the previous literary tradition, Yer guide tae the cheenge-ower, perhaps being a rare exception. Instead there has been an increase in the use of somewhat creative phonetic spellings based on the perceived sound-to-letter correspondences of Standard English, i.e. dialect writing, as exemplified in Alice's Carrànts in Wunnerlan or the adoption of a more esoteric "amalgam of traditional, surviving, revived, changed, and invented features" as exemplified in Hannlin Rede.

From Yer guide tae the cheenge-ower (digitaluk 2012)

Dae A need a new aerial?
Gin ye hae guid analogue reception the nou, ye'r like no tae need tae replace yer ruiftap or set-tap aerial for the cheenge-ower – thare nae sic thing as a 'deegital aerial'. But gin ye hae ill analogue reception the nou, ye'll mebbe need tae replace it.
Find oot by gaun til the aerial-pruifer on Teletext page 284. Anither wey is tae wait until efter the cheenge-ower for tae see if yer pictur's affect.

From Alice's Carrànts in Wunnerlan (Anne Morrison-Smyth, 2013)

The Caterpillar an Alice lukt at ither fur a quare while wi'oot taakin: finally the Caterpillar tuk the hookah oot o its mooth, an spoke tae hir in a languid, dozy voice.
"Wha ir yae?" said the Caterpillar.
This wusnae a pooerfu guid openin fur a yarn. Alice answert brev an baakwardly, "A—A harly know, Sir, jest at this minute—at least A know wha A wus this moarnin, but heth, A hae bin changed a wheen o times since thin."
"What dae yae mean bae that?" said the Caterpillar sternly. "Explain yersel!"
"A cannae explain maesel, A'm feart, Sir," said Alice, "baecaas A'm naw maesel, yae see."
"A dinnae see," said the Caterpillar.
"A cannae mak it onie mair clear," Alice answer, while polite, "fur A cannae unnerstan it maesel tae stairt wi; an baein sae monie different sizes in yin dae haes turnt mae heid."

From Hannlin Rede [annual report] 2012–2013 (Männystèr o Fairms an Kintra Fordèrin, 2012)

We hae cum guid speed wi fettlin tae brucellosis, an A'm mintin at bein haleheidit tae wun tae tha stannin o bein redd o brucellosis aathegither. Forbye, A'm leukkin tae see an ettlin in core at fettlin tae tha TB o Kye, takkin in complutherin anent a screengin ontak, tha wye we'll can pit owre an inlaik in ootlay sillert wi resydentèrs. Mair betoken, but, we'll be leukkin forbye tae uphaud an ingang airtit wi tha hannlins furtae redd ootcum disayses. An we'r fur stairtin in tae leukk bodes agane fur oor baste kenmairk gate, 'at owre tha nixt wheen o yeirs wull be tha ootcum o sillerin tae aboot £60m frae resydentèrs furtae uphaud tha hale hannlin adae wi beef an tha mïlk-hoose.

== See also ==
- Ulster Scots people
- Unionism in Ireland
- Dictionary of the Scots Language
- History of the Scots language
- Languages of Ireland
- Languages in the United Kingdom
- British literature in languages other than English
- W.F. Marshall
- Mid-Ulster English
