= Philip MacCann =

British author

Philip MacCann is a British author.

Born in Manchester, he was educated at Trinity College, Dublin and later studied creative writing at the University of East Anglia under Malcolm Bradbury. His first book, The Miracle Shed (1995), a collection of short stories, won the Rooney Prize for Irish Literature, and in 2000 he was awarded the Shiva Naipaul Memorial Prize.

In the 1990s he worked as a literary journalist for the Guardian newspaper and the Spectator magazine, contributing frequently to Prospect Magazine and others. During this time, he became known for his distinct classical aesthetic, statements about the ethical shortcomings of Art and he became known for his acerbic criticism of consumer capitalism. Even before the publication of The Miracle Shed was published he wrote in The Guardian his reluctance to continue publishing literary art in what was much more than a populist climate: a culture oppressed and vandalized by the abuse of corporate power. His first short stories appeared in Faber's First Fictions, the New Yorker and New Writing 1 and 3 (Minerva/British Council). Criticising the writing of the day as "becalmed writing from a stagnant pool", The Guardian singled out MacCann for special praise stating: "Really blazes—this is what Literature is about."

In 1999, The Observer newspaper selected him as one of twenty world authors expected to be significant in the new millennium. But in fact, only a handful of stories subsequently appeared: in Granta magazine, the Faber Book of Best New Irish Short Stories, The Dublin Review and The Irish Times. Since 1995, he has shown little interest in publishing and has had no public profile. Despite this, his one small book continues to be praised, and his silence still sparks a degree of curiosity on the Internet.

== The Miracle Shed ==
The stories were described by one reviewer as having "the nervous, risky feel of someone doodling with razor blades", with technical innovations and the strangeness of the imagery aiming for "aesthetic ecstasy". "MacCann's risky use of language, his weirdly beautiful style, inspires optimism, lifting the spirit as great art does. He's an immensely talented and original writer," wrote Time Out magazine. The story combines black humour and, at times, over-rich language to seduce readers into embracing tales of intense suffering—an effect that may mirror how characters are tempted by guilty joys.

== Themes ==
One explanatory phrase on the cover of the first edition "spiritual despair", perhaps helps to explain the ruthlessness and strangeness of Nature, its inappropriateness for human sensitivity and the ease with which evil is perpetrated, even in intimate relationships (whether between dysfunctional lovers or oppressive parents). One hallmark of the style is how scenes are dramatized with cold detachment and without authorial comment, assisting the realism. A recurring motif in these and later stories highlights the struggle of a very young couple coping with pregnancy. The vision shares with some American Catholic literature and some strands of Feminism a brutal vision of male sexuality. Other themes include: sexual rage, violence, frustration and taboos; poverty, prostitution and abuse; psychedelia; transcendentalism, magic and the occult.

== Awards and honours ==
- 1995 Rooney Prize for Irish Literature
- 2000 Shiva Naipaul Memorial Prize
