= David Herbison =

Irish poet

David Herbison (14 October 1800 – 26 May 1880) was an Irish poet, known as "the Bard of Dunclug". Some of his poems are in the Ulster Scots dialect, and he was one of the group of poets known as the Rhyming Weavers.

== Life ==
Herbison was born on 14 October 1800 in Ballymena, County Antrim, the fourth child of William Herbison, an innkeeper, and his wife Elizabeth. At three years of age he lost his sight through an attack of smallpox, and for four years was totally blind. Through medical treatment he regained the use of one eye, but his health continued to be delicate, and because of this he received little formal education. At fourteen he began to learn linen-weaving on a hand loom.

His father died in 1825, and on 5 April 1827 he and an elder brother sailed from Belfast for Canada. Their vessel was wrecked in the St. Lawrence River, and twenty-four of the passengers drowned, including his brother's wife and her child. The two brothers escaped with difficulty, losing their belongings, and made their way to Quebec City. Because of the shock of this experience, and the unfamiliar climate, he returned a few weeks later to Ireland, and settled down again beside Ballymena, resuming his old occupation of weaving. He married in 1830 Margaret Archbold, the daughter of a neighbouring farmer, and they lived in a cottage in Dunclug, near Ballymena.

Before emigrating he had begun to write poetry. With his first wages he had bought a copy of the works of the Scottish poet Allan Ramsay, walking to Belfast to obtain it; a year later, he made the same the journey to buy the works of Robert Burns. Shortly after his return from Canada he began to send contributions to local newspapers and periodicals, and to the Dublin Penny Journal, his first published poem appearing in the Northern Whig in 1830. Encouraged by the success of these ventures, he published in 1841 The Fate of McQuillan and O'Neill's Daughter, a Legend of Dunluce, with other Poems, which was well received. In 1848 he collected a number of other writings into Midnight Musings. His later publications were Woodland Wanderings (1858), The Snow-Wreath (1869), and The Children of the Year (1876). He continued to publish pieces in newspapers of Belfast and elsewhere.

Herbison wrote in standard English, and in the Ulster Scots dialect, which he used less in his later works, since the dialect became less popular and he wished to write for a wider readership. He was one of the group of poets known as the Rhyming Weavers, and was known by fellow poets as the Bard of Dunclug. He became reasonably prosperous from his literary success, and in later years he became an agent for a Belfast linen firm. He retained a radical outlook, supporting the Tenant Right League.

He and his wife had four sons and a daughter, of whom only a son remained in Ireland, the others emigrating. Several of Herbison's poems deal with the subject of emigration from Ireland.

On 26 May 1880 he died in his cottage in Dunclug, and was buried in the New Cemetery in Ballymena, where in 1882 a monument to his memory was erected by public subscription. A posthumous collection of his five books of verse was published in 1883.
