= James Orr (poet) =

James Orr (1770 – 24 April 1816), known as the Bard of Ballycarry, was a poet or rhyming weaver from Ballycarry, Co. Antrim in the province of Ulster in Ireland, who wrote in English and Ulster Scots. His most famous poem was The Irishman. He was the foremost of the Ulster Weaver Poets, and was writing contemporaneously with Robert Burns.

Orr joined the Irish nationalist Society of United Irishmen in 1791 and took part in the Irish Rebellion of 1798. The United Army of Ulster, of which he was a part, was defeated at the Battle of Antrim and after a time hiding from the authorities, he fled to America. He remained there for a short time, earning a living by working for a newspaper, but returned to Ballycarry in 1802 under an amnesty. He died in Ballycarry in 1816 at the age of 46. Orr had supported the Haitian Revolution and wrote a poem 'Toussaint's Farewell to St Domingo" about it.

An imposing monument to Orr, erected by local Freemasons in 1831, is sited in the Templecorran cemetery near Ballycarry, in memory of the great Mason and Ulster Weaver Poet. Orr had been a charter member of the Lodge.

The version of the Irish passport issued in 2013 has lines of poetry in Irish, English and Ulster Scots. The Ulster Scots lines are from Orr's poem Written in Winter and appear on page 28 of the document.

== Poems ==
James Orr (1770–1816) writes from his experience of the story of the exiles from Ballycarry after the ill-fated 1798 Rebellion.

The Passengers

How calm an' cozie is the wight,
Frae cares an' conflicts clear ay,
Whase settled headpiece never made,
His heels or han's be weary!
Perplex'd is he whase anxious schemes
Pursue applause, or siller,
Success nor sates, nor failure tames;
Bandied frae post to pillar
Is he, ilk day

As we were, Comrades, at the time
We mov'd frae Ballycarry,
To wan'er thro' the woody clime
Burgoyne gied oure to harrie:
Wi' frien's consent we prie't a gill,
An' monie a house did call at,
Shook han's, an' smil't; tho' ilk fareweel
Strak, like a mighty mallet,
Our hearts, that day

This is my locker, yon'ers Jock's,
In that aul creel, sea-store is
Thir births beside us are the Lockes
My uncle's there before us;
Here hang my tins an' vitriol jug,
Nae thief's at han' to meddle 'em
L—d, man, I'm glad ye're a' sae snug;
But och! 'tis owre like Bedlam
Wi' a' this day

Aince mair luck lea's us (plain 'tis now
A murd'rer in some mess is)
An English frigate heaves in view,
I'll bail her board, an' press us
Taupies beneath their wives wha stole,
Or 'mang auld sails lay flat ay,
Like whitrats peepin' frae their hole,
Cried 'is she British, wat ye,
Or French this day?'

'Twas but a brig frae Baltimore,
To Larne wi' lintseed steerin';
Twa days ago she left the shore,
Let's watch for lan' appearin';
Spies frae the shrouds, like laigh dark clouds
Descried domes, mountains, bushes;
Tha exiles griev't – the sharpers thiev't –
While cronies bous't like fishes
Conven't, that day

Whan glidin' up the Delaware,
We cam' fornent Newcastle,
Gypes co'ert the whaft to gove, an' stare
While out, in boats, we bustle:
Creatures wha ne'er had seen a black,
Fu' scar't took to their shankies;
Sae, wi' our best rags on our back,
We mixt amang the Yankies,
An' skail't, that day

== See also ==
- List of Irish writers
