= Languages of Ireland =

- Main: English (95%); Irish (RoI: 39.8% claim some ability to speak Irish); Ulster Scots (0.3%); Shelta
- Immigrant: Polish, French, German, Portuguese, Spanish, Russian, Lithuanian
- Signed: Irish Sign Language; Northern Ireland Sign Language
- Keyboard layout: Irish or British QWERTY
- Source: ebs_243_en.pdf (europa.eu)

There are a number of languages used in Ireland, where Irish and English serve as the two official languages, though the diversity of spoken languages is expanding due to increasing immigration. Since the late 18th century, English has been the predominant first language, displacing Irish. A large minority claims some ability to use Irish, and it is the first language for a small percentage of the population. In the 19th century, the Gaelic Revival, a cultural movement dedicated to reclaiming the Irish language, contributed to the constitutional recognition of the Irish language. A key aspect of the movement was the Gaelic League, established in 1893, which promoted Irish literature and Irish language in education.

In the Republic of Ireland, under Article 8 of the Constitution of Ireland (1937), both languages have official status, with Irish being the national and first official language, and English as the second official language. While, English is the dominant language in most of the country, Irish is the primary language in Gaeltacht areas, where it is used in everyday life. Most students learn Irish at school as a core subject, outside Gaeltacht areas.

The Official Languages Act was enacted in 2003 to support the use of Irish in public life. It requires public services to be provided in both Irish and English. Also, it established the Office of An Coimisinéir Teanga (Irish Language Commissioner) to monitor compliance. Additionally, in 2021, the National Plan for Irish Language Public Services was passed aiming to have 20% of public servants be competent in Irish by 2030.

In Northern Ireland, English is the primary language for 95% of the population, and de facto official language, while Irish is recognised as an official language and Ulster Scots is recognised as a minority language under the Identity and Language (Northern Ireland) Act 2022. Irish language measures in Northern Ireland apply only within that jurisdiction, and are separated from the Republic of Ireland's Official Languages Act framework.

== Prehistoric languages ==
The first linguistic records in Ireland are Primitive Irish inscriptions written in the Ogham alphabet. Scholars generally estimate that the earliest of these inscriptions were made at least in the 5th century AD on Ogham stones. Originally, Ogham script has twenty characters separated into four groups of five. The scripts were made by combining short lines and notches to a stem line. Although, it was superseded by modern penmanship in the eighth century, there is a chance that it was continued until the nineteenth century. Languages spoken in Iron Age Ireland before then are now irretrievable, although there are some claims of traces in Irish toponymy.

== Modern languages ==
A catch and release sign in Ireland. As well as Ireland's official languages (English and Irish), it also displays other European languages (French, German, Swedish, Italian, Latvian, Czech, Polish, as well as transliterated Russian). However, perhaps reflecting Ireland's recent transition to multilingualism, many translations are imperfect and diacritics are mostly absent.

=== English ===
Middle English was first introduced by the Cambro-Norman settlers in the 12th century. It did not initially take hold as a widely spoken language, as the Norman elite spoke Anglo-Norman. In time, many Norman settlers intermarried and assimilated to the Irish cultures and some even became "more Irish than the Irish themselves". Following the Tudor conquest of Ireland and the 1610–15 Ulster Plantation, particularly in the old Pale, Elizabethan English became the language of court, justice, administration, business, trade and of the landed gentry. Monolingual Irish speakers were generally of the poorer and less educated classes with no land. Irish was accepted as a vernacular language, but then as now, fluency in English was an essential element for those who wanted social mobility and personal advancement. After the legislative Union of Great Britain and Ireland's succession of Irish Education Acts that sponsored the Irish national schools and provided free public primary education, Hiberno-English replaced the Irish language. Since the 1850s, English medium education was promoted by both the UK administration and the Roman Catholic Church. This greatly assisted the waves of immigrants forced to seek new lives in the US and throughout the Empire after the Famine. Since then the various local Hiberno-English dialects comprise the vernacular language throughout the island.

The 2002 census found that 103,000 British citizens were living in the Republic of Ireland, along with 11,300 from the US and 8,900 from Nigeria, all of whom would speak other dialects of English. The 2006 census listed 165,000 people from the UK, and 22,000 from the US. The 2016 census reported a decline in UK nationals to the 2002 level: 103,113.

=== Irish ===
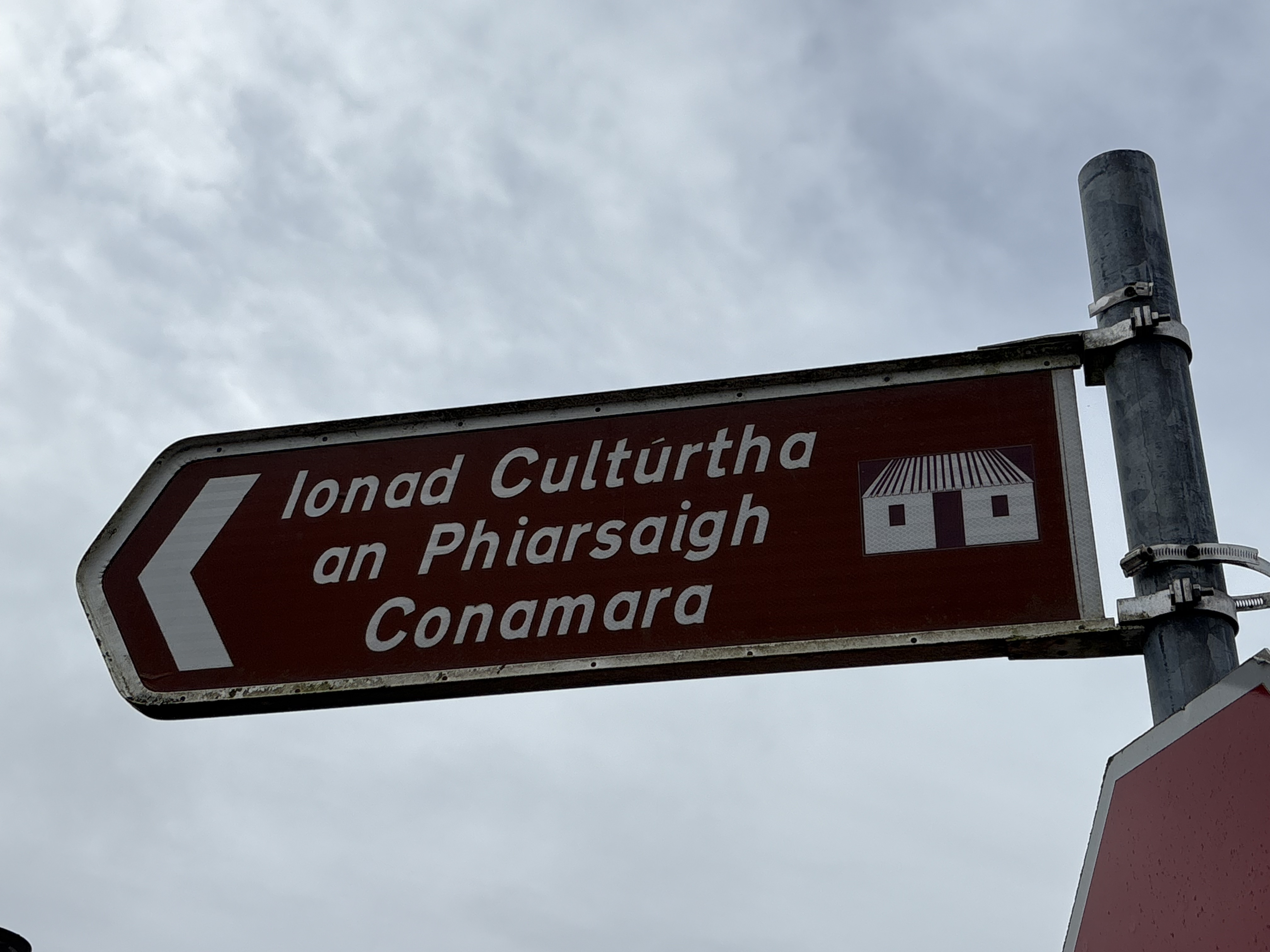
A sign in Irish, Rosmuc, County Galway

The original Primitive Irish was introduced by Celtic speakers. Primitive Irish gradually evolved into Old Irish, spoken between the 5th and the 10th centuries, and then into Middle Irish. Middle Irish was spoken in Ireland, Scotland, and the Isle of Man through the 12th century, when it began to evolve into modern Irish in Ireland, Scottish Gaelic in Scotland, and the Manx language in the Isle of Man. Today, Irish is recognized as the first official language of the Republic of Ireland and is officially recognized in the European Union. Communities that speak Irish as their first language, generally in sporadic regions on the island's west coast, are collectively called the Gaeltacht.

In the 2016 Irish census, 8,068 census forms were completed in Irish, and just under 74,000 of the total (1.7%) said they spoke it daily. The total number of people who answered 'yes' to being able to speak Irish to some extent in April 2016 was 1,761,420, 39.8% of respondents.

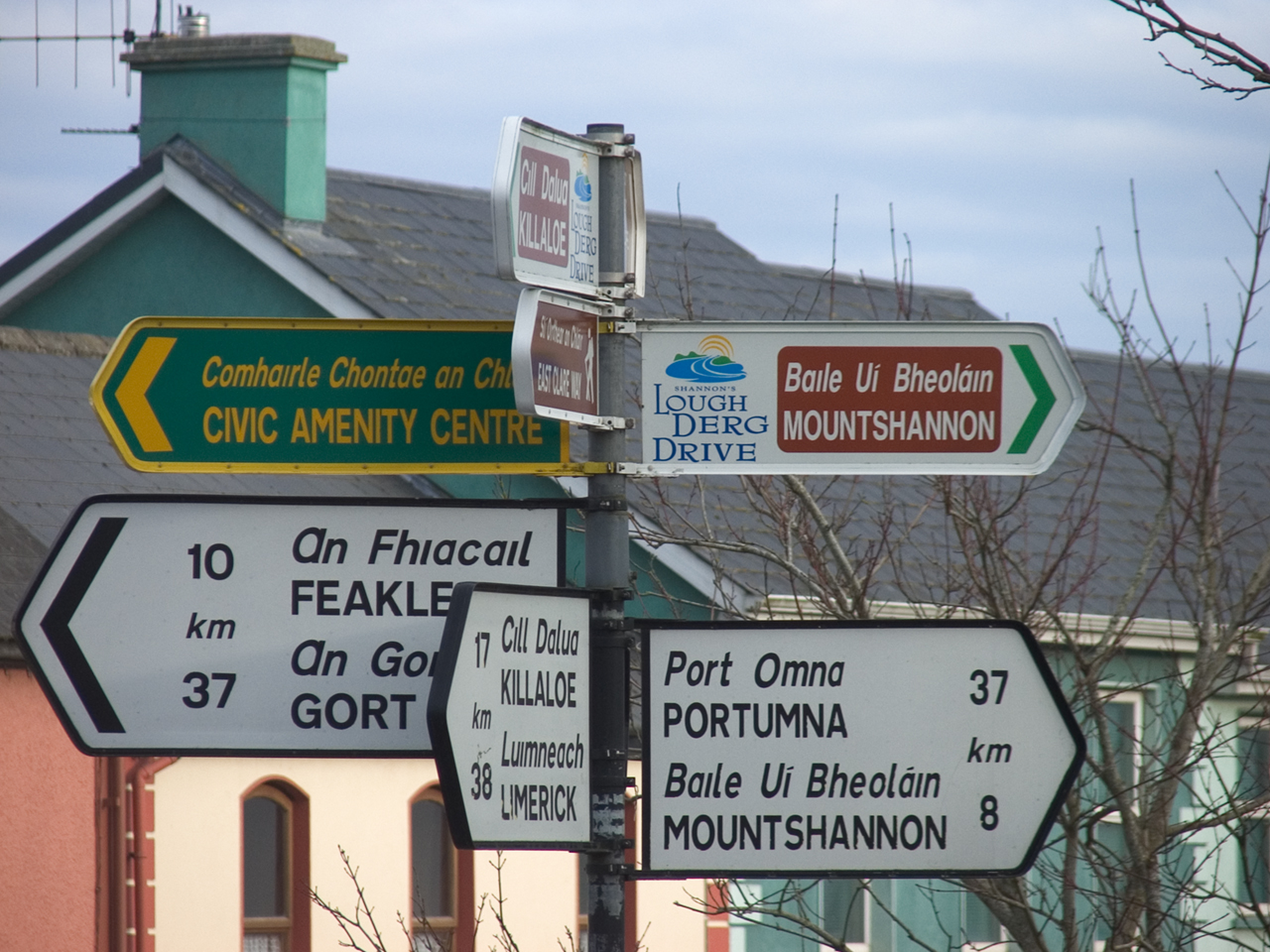
Bilingual road signs in Scariff, County Clare

Although the use of Irish in educational and broadcasting contexts has increased, English is still overwhelmingly dominant in most social, economic, and cultural contexts. In 2025, 92% of primary schools provide education in English, while 8% teach in Irish. In the media, there is an Irish-language TV station TG4, Cúla 4 a children's channel on satellite, 5 radio stations such as the national station RTÉ Raidió na Gaeltachta, Raidió na Life in Dublin, as well as Raidió Fáilte in Belfast and a youth radio station Raidió Rí-Rá. There are also several newspapers, such as Tuairisc.ie, Meon Eile, Seachtain (a weekly supplement in the Irish Independent), and several magazines including Comhar, Feasta, and An Timire. There are also occasional columns written in Irish in English-language newspapers, including The Irish Times, The Irish News, The Irish Examiner, Metro Éireann, Irish Echo, the Evening Echo, and the Andersonstown News. All of the 40 or so radio stations in the Republic have to have some weekly Irish-language programming to obtain their broadcasting license. Similarly, RTÉ runs Nuacht, a news show, in Irish and Léargas, a documentary show, in Irish with English subtitles. The Official Languages Act 2003 strengthened and expanded the rights of Irish citizens concerning the Irish language, including the use of Irish in court proceedings. All Dáil debates are to be recorded in Irish also. In 2007, Irish became the 23rd official language of the European Union.

=== Ulster Scots ===
Ulster Scots, sometimes called Ullans, is a variety of Scots spoken in Northern Ireland and some parts of County Donegal. It is promoted and supported by the Ulster Scots Agency, a cross-border body formed after the 1998 Good Friday Agreement, which was the peace deal that ended the clashing of the Catholic and Protestant churches, known as the Troubles. In 2001, Ulster-Scots was official recognized under the European Charter for Regional or Minority Languages by the UK government. Ulster-Scots's classification as either an independent language or a dialect of Scots has been a subject of debate in Northern Ireland. Supporters, such as members of Unionist community, advocate for its recognition as a language to affirm cultural heritage. On the other hand, critics, such as nationalists, emphasize the cultural and historical significance of the Irish Language and argue that Ulster Scots is a variant of English and Scots, favoring its classification as a dialect.

=== Shelta ===
Shelta is a cant, based upon both Irish and English, generally spoken by the Irish Traveller community. It is known as Gammon to Irish speakers and Shelta by the linguistic community. It is a mixture of English and Irish, with Irish being the lexifier language.

Shelta is a community-specific language, with a refusal by the Travellers to share with non-travellers, named "Buffers". When speaking Shelta in front of Buffers, Travellers will disguise the structure so as to make it seem like they aren't speaking Shelta at all. There is fear that if outsiders know the entirety of the language, it will be used to bring further discrimination to the Traveller community. According to the 2011 census, the Irish Traveller population has increased to 29,573.

=== Sign languages ===
Irish Sign Language (ISL) is the primary sign language of Ireland. It is used by about 6,500 deaf people who are living in the Republic and Northern Ireland. It has little relation to either spoken Irish or English, and is more closely related to French Sign Language (LSF). Northern Ireland Sign Language (NISL) is used in Northern Ireland, and is related to both ISL and British Sign Language (BSL) in various ways. ISL is also used in Northern Ireland. The origin of ISL remains unclear because it wasn't recorded until the establishment of Deaf schools around 1814.

Although ISL is considered Ireland's second native language alongside Irish, it lacks official recognition in Irish legislation.The World Federation of the Deaf (WFD) and Irish Deaf Society (IDS) advocate for sign language as a fundamental human right. This is supported by Article 24 of the UN Convention on the Rights of Person with Disabilities (UNCRPD), which emphasizes the importance of sign language in education and social development. While the Irish government has ratified the conventions, it has yet to incorporate these provisions into law.

Historically, oralism, the prioritization of lipreading and remaining hearing to teach deaf students, discouraged signing. In 2017, the Irish Sign Language (ISL) Act made ISL a distinct language and protects its use and promotion. A 2023 review by the National Disability Authority (NDA) shows that the impact of the ISL Act of 2017 remains limited due to a lack of promotion and standardized curriculum. Since ISL is not mandated by the state curriculum, many deaf children face a lack of early linguistic exposure.

=== Immigrant languages ===
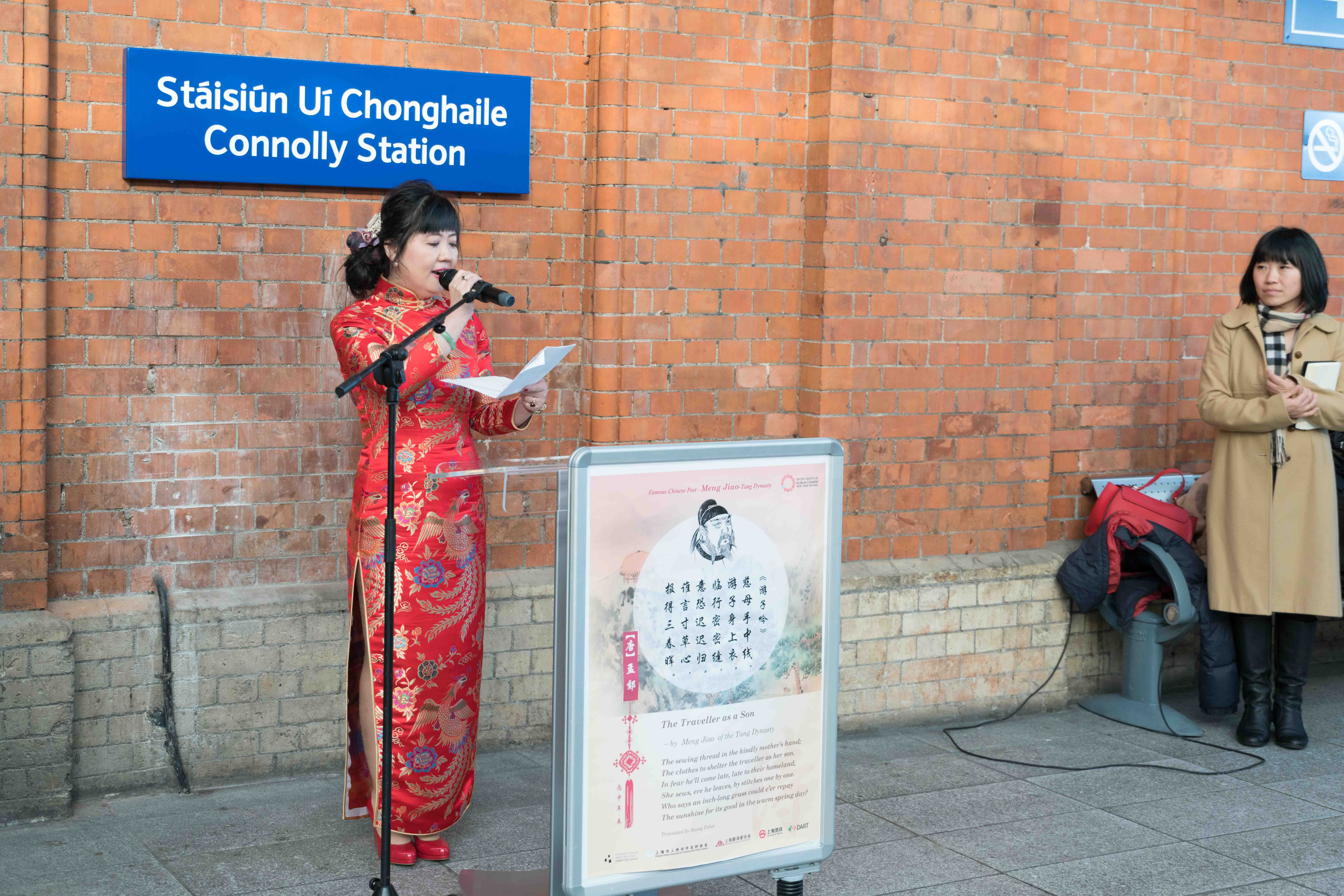
Recitation of Chinese poetry at Dublin Connolly railway station to celebrate Chinese New Year. There are over 15,000 Chinese-speakers in Ireland.

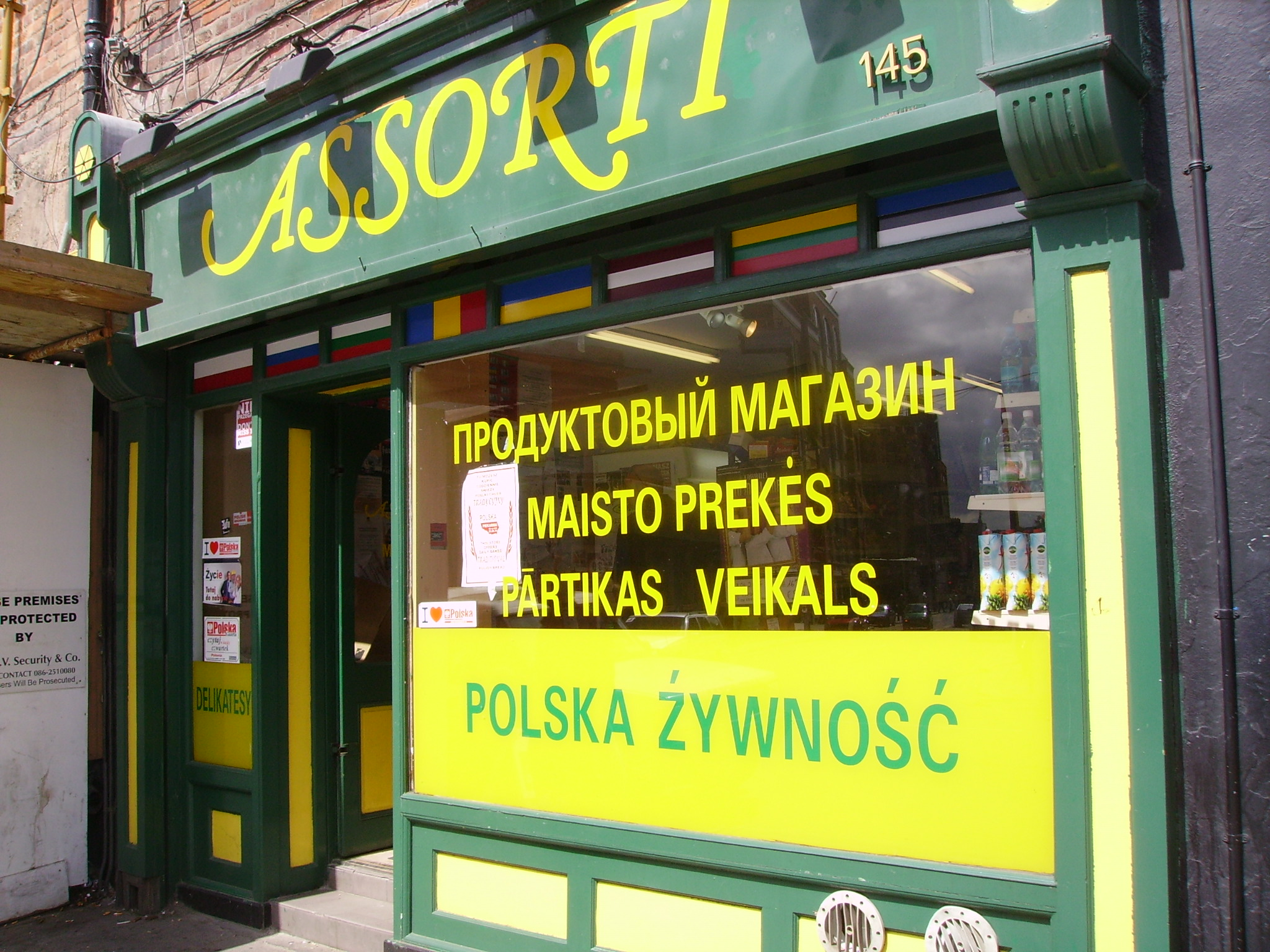
Shop in Dublin selling Eastern European food, with signage in Russian, Lithuanian, Latvian and Polish.

With increased immigration into Ireland, there has been a substantial increase in the number of people speaking languages. The table below gives figures from the 2016 census of population usually resident and present in the state who speak a language other than English, Irish or a sign language at home.

- Afro-Asiatic
  - Arabic 16,072
  - Somali 1,495
- Austroasiatic (Mon–Khmer)
  - Vietnamese 1,260
- Austronesian
  - Filipino 8,305
  - Tagalog 5,447
  - Malay 1,618
- Dravidian
  - Malayalam 10,642
  - Tamil 2,331
  - Telugu 1,502
- Indo-European
  - Baltic
    - Lithuanian 35,362
    - Latvian 14,197
  - Germanic
    - German 28,331
    - Dutch 5,156
    - Afrikaans 2,228
    - Swedish 2,031
  - Indo-Iranian
    - Urdu 13,230
    - Hindi 5,483
    - Bengali 4,302
    - Punjabi 2,169
  - Romance
    - French 54,948
    - Spanish 32,405
    - Romanian 36,683
    - Portuguese 20,833
    - Italian 14,505
  - Slavic
    - Polish 135,895
    - Russian 21,707
    - Slovak 9,544
    - Czech 5,380
    - Ukrainian 84,613
    - Bulgarian 2,895
    - Bosnian 1,196
    - Croatian 5,176
  - Other Indo-European
    - Albanian 2,133
- Japonic
  - Japanese 1,752
- Niger–Congo
  - Yoruba 8,639
  - Igbo 3,623
  - Swahili 1,888
  - Shona 991
- Sino-Tibetan
  - Chinese 17,584
- Tai–Kadai
  - Thai 2,135
- Turkic
  - Turkish 2,047
- Uralic
  - Hungarian 9,905
  - Estonian 1,148
- Other Northern European languages 1,090
- Other Southern European languages 857
- Other Eastern European languages 1,137
- Other Asian languages 4,465
- Other African languages 4,342
- Other languages 23,451

== Extinct languages ==
None of these languages were spoken by a majority of the population, but are of historical interest, giving loan words to Irish and Hiberno-English.

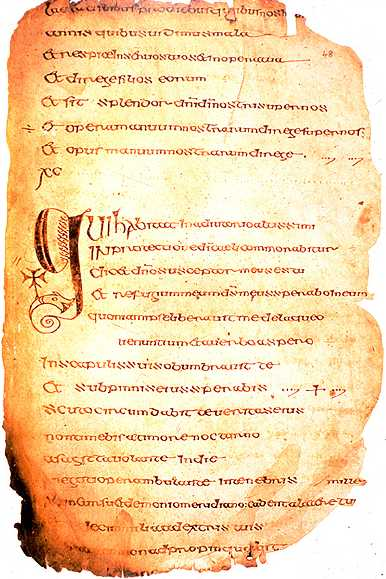
The Cathach of St. Columba, a 6th-century psalter in Vulgar Latin, produced in Ireland.

=== Latin ===
Late Latin was introduced by the early Christians by c. 500. It remained a church language, but also was the official written language before and after the Norman conquest in 1171. Ecclesiastical Latin was used by the Roman Catholic church for services until the Vatican II reforms in 1962–65. Latin is still used in a small number of churches in Dublin, Cork, Limerick and Stamullen.

=== Norman language ===
Norman settlers (especially their élite) introduced the Norman or Anglo-Norman language during the Norman invasion of Ireland of 1169. From Norman derived "Law French", a few words of which continue to be used today for certain legal purposes in both jurisdictions on the island.

=== Yola ===
Yola was a language which evolved from Middle English, surviving in the Barony of Forth and Bargy in County Wexford up to the 19th century. It was the language of the Saxon and Welsh-Flemish followers of the Anglo-Norman knights who settled in Ireland. Over time, Yola absorbed elements of the Irish language. The dialect is characterized by its unique vocabulary and expressions, with some words still in use among the local population.

=== Fingallian ===
Fingallian was similar to Yola but spoken in Fingal up until the mid-19th century. It was based on the 13th-century colonial South-Western English of the Pale. While there are only slight records of Fingallian, it likely resembled the Forth dialect recorded by Poole early in the last century. Due to its proximity to Dublin, Fingallian did not retain its unique characteristics for as long as other dialects might have.

=== Hiberno-Yiddish ===
Hiberno-Yiddish, spoken by Irish Jews, was based on Lithuanian Yiddish. Yiddish has different dialects that are similar with a few vowel alternations. The main division is between Western Yiddish and East European Yiddish. East European Yiddish is further divided into Central and Eastern Yiddish, with Eastern Yiddish subdivided into Northeastern and Southeastern dialects. The differences between these dialects are mostly in vowel sounds, and these alternations follow regular and predictable patterns, called “vowel equations.” These regional dialects formed gradually and were established in the late 17th century. The Yiddish-speaking population was severely reduced during the Holocaust, yet it remained one of the largest group among Jews. In the late 20th century, the use of Yiddish declined even further due to assimilation and repression of the dialect.

== Language education ==
=== Republic of Ireland ===
In primary schools, most pupils are taught to speak, read and write in Irish and English. The vast majority of schools teach through English, although a growing number of Gaelscoileanna, Irish-medium schools outside of Gaeltacht areas, teach through Irish. Most students at second level study English as an L1 language, the main language of instruction and communication, Irish as a compulsory subject, and other Continental European languages as L2 languages. However, in Gaeltacht areas and Irish-medium schools, Irish functions as an L1 language and is the primary language of instruction for all subjects. The linguistic population of the students are diverse, as they cater to native Irish speakers, students from bilingual and multilingual home, and those whose main language at home is English. The Continental European languages available for the Junior Certificate and the Leaving Certificate include French, German, Italian and Spanish; Leaving Certificate students can also study Arabic, Japanese, Russian, and since 2025, Ukrainian. Some schools also offer Ancient Greek, Hebrew Studies and Latin at second level.

Students immigrated to Ireland after finishing primary school, or studied abroad until the age of twelve, may apply for an exemption from learning Irish. Pupils with learning difficulties can also seek exemption. A recent study has revealed that over half of those pupils who got exemption from studying Irish went on to study a Continental European language. The following is a list of foreign languages taken at Leaving Certificate level in 2007, followed by the number as a percentage of all students taking Mathematics for comparison (mathematics is a mandatory subject).

Language	Higher Level	Ordinary Level	Total candidates	% of Maths
L1 English	31,078	17,277	48,355	98.79%
L2 Irish	13,831	25,662	44,018	89.94%
L2 French	13,770	14,035	27,805	56.695%
L2 German	4,554	2,985	7,539	15.372%
L2 Spanish	1,533	1,127	2,660	5.424%
L2 Italian	140	84	224	0.457%
Latin	111		111	0.226%
L2 Japanese	90		90	0.184%
L2 Arabic	117	13	130	0.265%
L2 Russian	181		181	0.369%
L2 Latvian	32		32	0.065%
L2 Lithuanian	61		61	0.125%
L2 Dutch	16		16	0.033%
L2 Portuguese	27		27	0.055%
L2 Polish	53		53	0.108%
L2 Romanian	25		25	0.051%

=== Northern Ireland ===
The predominant language in the education system in Northern Ireland is English, with Irish-medium schools teaching exclusively in the Irish language. The ULTACH Trust coordinates the promotion of Irish in English-medium schools. In the GCSE and A Level qualification, Irish is the 3rd most chosen modern language in Northern Ireland, and in the top ten in the UK. Intakes in GCSE Irish and A Level Irish are increasing, and the usage of the language is also increasing.
