= Arraignment =

Formal reading of the offence to a criminal defendant

Arraignment at the Ministries Trial, 20 December 1947

Arraignment is a formal reading of a criminal charging document in the presence of the defendant, to inform them of the criminal charges against them. In response to arraignment, in some jurisdictions, the accused is expected to enter a plea; in other jurisdictions, no plea is required. Acceptable pleas vary among jurisdictions, but they generally include guilty, not guilty, and the peremptory pleas (pleas in bar) setting out reasons why a trial cannot proceed. Pleas of nolo contendere ('no contest') and the Alford plea are allowed in some circumstances.

== By country ==
=== Australia ===
In the Australian legal system, arraignment is the first stage in a criminal trial. The indictment is read to the defendant, who is asked to plead guilty or not guilty. Arraignment procedures vary somewhat among jurisdictions. In New South Wales, the arraignment takes place before the judge only. In South Australian practice, the jury hears the arraignment. In Queensland the indictment is read to the defendant by the judge's associate prior to the empanelling of the jury.

=== Canada ===
In British Columbia, arraignment takes place in one of the first few court appearances by the defendant or their lawyer. The defendant is asked whether they plead guilty or not guilty to each charge.

=== France ===
In France, the general rule is that one cannot remain in police custody for more than 24 hours from the time of their arrest. However, police custody can last another 24 hours in specific circumstances, especially if the offence is punishable by at least one year's imprisonment, or if the investigation is deemed to require the extra time, and can last up to 96 hours in certain cases involving terrorism, drug trafficking, or organised crime. The police need to have the consent of the prosecutor, the procureur. In the vast majority of cases, the prosecutor will consent.

=== Germany ===
In Germany, if one has been arrested and taken into custody by the police, one must be brought before a judge as soon as possible and at the latest on the day after the arrest.

=== New Zealand ===
Under New Zealand law, at the first appearance of the accused, they are read the charges and asked for a plea. The available pleas are: guilty, not guilty, and no plea. The response of "no plea" allows the defendant to get legal advice on the plea, which must be made on the second appearance.

=== South Africa ===
In South Africa, arraignment is defined as the calling upon the accused to appear, the informing of the accused of the crime charged against them, the demanding of the accused whether they plead guilty or not guilty, and the entering of their plea.

=== United Kingdom ===
In England, Wales, and Northern Ireland, arraignment is the first of 11 stages in a criminal trial in the Crown Court following committal from the magistrates' court, and involves the clerk of the court reading out the indictment. A summary trial in the magistrates' court begins with a preparation for trial hearing which is not referred to as an arraignment.

In England and Wales, the police cannot legally detain anyone for more than 24 hours without charging them, unless an officer with the rank of superintendent (or above) authorises detention for a further 12 hours (i.e., 36 hours total), or a magistrates' court authorises detention by the police before charge for up to a maximum of 96 hours; for terrorism-related offences a person can be held by the police for up to 28 days before charge. If they are not released after being charged, they should be brought before a court as soon as practicable.

=== United States ===
The Sixth Amendment to the United States Constitution grants criminal defendants the right to be notified of the charges against them. Under the United States' Federal Rules of Criminal Procedure, arraignment shall consist of an open reading of the indictment (and delivery of a copy) to the defendant, and a call for them to plead.

In federal courts, arraignment takes place in two stages. The first is called the "initial arraignment" and must take place within 48 hours of an individual's arrest, or within 72 hours if the individual was arrested on the weekend and not able to go before a judge until Monday. During this stage, the defendant is informed of the pending legal charges and is informed of their right to retain counsel. The presiding judge also decides at what amount, if any, to set bail. During the second stage, the post-indictment arraignment, the defendant is allowed to enter a plea.

In New York, a person arrested without a warrant and kept in custody must be brought before a local criminal court for arraignment "without unnecessary delay". A delay of more than 24 hours is rebuttably presumed to be unnecessary.

In California, arraignments must be conducted without unnecessary delay and, in any event, within 48 hours of arrest, excluding weekends and holidays.

== Form of the arraignment ==
The wording of the arraignment varies from jurisdiction to jurisdiction. However, it generally conforms with the following principles:

1. The accused person (defendant) is addressed by name;
2. The charge against the accused person is read, including the alleged date, time, and place of offense (and sometimes the names of the state's witnesses and the range of punishment for the charge(s)); and,
3. The accused person is asked formally how they plead.

== Video arraignment ==
Video arraignment is the act of conducting the arraignment process using some form of videoconferencing technology. Use of video arraignment system allows the court to conduct the requisite arraignment process without the need to transport the defendant to the courtroom by using an audio-visual link between the location where the defendant is being held and the courtroom.

Use of the video arraignment process addresses the problems associated with having to transport defendants. The transportation of defendants requires time, puts additional demands on the public safety organizations to provide for the safety of the public, court personnel and for the security of the population held in detention. It also addresses the rising costs of transportation.

== Guilty and not-guilty pleas ==
If the defendant pleads guilty, an evidentiary hearing usually follows. The court is not required to accept a guilty plea. During the hearing, the judge assesses the offense, the mitigating factors, and the defendant's character, and passes sentence.

If the defendant pleads not guilty, a date is set for a preliminary hearing or a trial.

In the past, a defendant who refused to plead (or "stood mute") was subject to peine forte et dure (Law French for "strong and hard punishment"). Today, in common law jurisdictions, the court enters a plea of not guilty for a defendant who refuses to enter a plea. The rationale for this is the defendant's right to silence.

== Pre-trial release ==
This is also often the stage at which arguments for or against pre-trial release and bail may be made, depending on the alleged crime and jurisdiction.

== See also ==
- Desk appearance ticket
