= Legal English =

English as used in legal matters

Legal English, also known as legalese, is a register of English used in legal writing. It differs from day-to-day spoken English in a variety of ways including the use of specialized vocabulary, syntactic constructions, and set phrases such as legal doublets.

Legal English has traditionally been the preserve of lawyers from English-speaking countries. Due to the spread of Legal English as the predominant language of international business, as well as its role as a legal language within the European Union (EU), Legal English is now a global phenomenon even in non-English speaking countries.

== Historical development ==
In prehistoric Britain, traditional common law was discussed in the vernacular (see Celtic law). The legal language and legal tradition changed with waves of conquerors over the following centuries. Roman Britain (after the conquest beginning in AD 43) followed Roman legal tradition, and its legal language was Latin. Following the Roman departure from Britain circa 410 and the Anglo-Saxon invasion of Britain, the dominant tradition was instead Anglo-Saxon law, which was discussed in the Germanic vernacular (Old English), and written in Old English since circa 600, beginning with the Law of Æthelberht. Following the Norman invasion of England in 1066, Anglo-Norman French became the official language of legal proceedings in England for a period of nearly 300 years until the Pleading in English Act 1362 (and continued in minor use for another 300 years), while Medieval Latin was used for written records for over 650 years. Some English technical terms were retained, however (see Anglo-Saxon law: Language and dialect for details).

In legal pleadings, Anglo-Norman developed into Law French, from which many words in modern legal English are derived. These include property, estate, chattel, lease, executor, and tenant. The use of Law French during this period had an enduring influence on the general linguistic register of modern legal English. That use also accounts for some of the complex linguistic structures used in legal writing. In 1362, the Statute of Pleading was enacted, which stated that all legal proceedings should be conducted in English (but recorded in Latin). This marked the beginning of formal Legal English; Law French continued to be used in some forms into the 17th century, although it became increasingly degenerate.

From 1066, Latin was the language of formal records and statutes, and was replaced by English in the Proceedings in Courts of Justice Act 1730. However, because only the highly-educated were fluent in Latin, it never became the language of legal pleading or debate. The influence of Latin can be seen in a number of words and phrases such as ad hoc, de facto, de jure, bona fide, inter alia, and ultra vires, which remain in current use in legal writing (see Law Latin).

=== Style ===
In 2004, David Crystal proposed a stylistic influence upon English legal language. During the medieval period, lawyers used a mixture of Latin, French and English. To avoid ambiguity, lawyers often offered pairs of words from different languages. Sometimes there was little ambiguity to resolve and the pairs merely gave greater emphasis, becoming a stylistic habit. This is a feature of legal style that continues to the present day. Examples of mixed language doublets are: "breaking and entering" (English/French), "fit and proper" (English/French), "lands and tenements" (English/French), and "will and testament" (English/Latin). Examples of English-only doublets are "let and hindrance" and "have and hold".

Modern English vocabulary draws significantly from Germanic languages, French, and Latin, the lattermost often by way of French. These vocabularies are used preferentially in different registers, with words of French origin being more formal than those of Germanic origin, and words of Latin origin being more formal than those of French origin. Thus, the extensive use of French and Latin words in Legal English results in a relatively formal style.

Further, legal English is useful for its dramatic effect: for example, a subpoena compelling a witness to appear in court often ends with the archaic threat "Fail not, at your peril"; the "peril" is not described (being arrested and held in contempt of court) but the formality of the language tends to have a stronger effect on the recipient of the subpoena than a simple statement like "We can arrest you if you don't show up".

Whereas legal language in the medieval period combined Latin, French, and English to avoid ambiguity. According to Walter Probert, judicial lawyers, roughly starting in the twentieth century, often manipulate the language to be more persuasive of their campaign ideals.

== Key features ==
As noted above, legal English differs greatly from standard English in a number of ways. The most important of these differences are as follows:

- Use of terms of art. Legal English, in common with the language used by other trades and professions, employs a great deal of technical terminology which is unfamiliar to the layman (e.g. waiver, restraint of trade, restrictive covenant, promissory estoppel). Much of this vocabulary is derived from French and Latin.
- These terms of art include ordinary words used with special meanings. For example, the familiar term consideration refers, in legal English, to contracts and means an act, forbearance or promise by one party to a contract that constitutes the price for which the promise of the other party is bought (Oxford Dictionary of Law). Other examples are construction, prefer, redemption, furnish, hold, and find.
- Lack of punctuation. Old legal documents sometimes omitted all punctuation. In England, this arose from the perception that the meaning of legal documents should be contained only in the words used, and that punctuation created ambiguity. Another reason was the concern that punctuation could be added undetectably to a document after it came into effect and so alter its meaning. Therefore, the presence of punctuation could be used to detect any tampering with the original document. Punctuation is commonly used in modern legal drafting to clarify the meaning of any particular sentence.
- Use of doublets and triplets. The mix of languages used in early legalese led to the tendency in legal English to string together two or three words to convey a single legal concept. Examples are null and void, fit and proper, (due) care and attention, perform and discharge, terms and conditions, controversy or claim, promise, agree and covenant and cease and desist. While originally being done to help all lawyers regardless of the language they spoke (English, French, or Latin), it now often joins words with identical meanings.
- Unusual word order. There is a noticeable difference in the word order used compared to standard English. For example, the provisions for termination hereinafter appearing or will at the cost of the borrower forthwith comply with the same.
- Use of unfamiliar pro-forms. For example, the same, the said, the aforementioned etc. The use of the terms often do not replace the noun but are used as adjectives to modify the noun. For example, the said John Smith.
- Use of pronominal adverbs. Words like hereof, thereof, and whereof (and further derivatives, including -at, -in, -after, -before, -with, -by, -above, -on, -upon) are not often used in standard English. Their use in legal English is primarily to avoid repeating names or phrases, such as the parties hereto instead of the parties to this contract.
- -er, -or, and -ee name endings. Legal English contains some words and titles, such as employer and employee; lessor and lessee, in which the reciprocal and opposite nature of the relationship is indicated by the use of alternative endings.
- Use of phrasal verbs. Phrasal verbs play a large role in legal English and are often used in a quasi-technical sense, such as parties enter into contracts, put down deposits, serve [documents] upon other parties, write off debts, attend at locations, and so on.
- Operation within a specific disciplinary value system delimited by professional, epistemological and pragmatic concerns (use of reasonable, proper, clear, appropriate, etc.).

== Education ==
Because of the prevalence of the English language in international business relations, as well as its role as a legal language globally, a feeling has existed for a long period in the international legal community that traditional English language training is not sufficient to meet lawyers’ English language requirements. The main reason for this is that such training generally ignores the ways in which English usage may be modified by the particular demands of legal practice – and by the conventions of legal English as a separate branch of English in itself.

As a result, non-native English speaking legal professionals and law students increasingly seek specialist training in legal English, and such training is now provided by law schools, language centres, private firms and podcasts that focus on legal language. The UK TOLES examination was set up to teach legal English to non-native English speakers. The exams focus on the aspects of legal English noted as lacking by lawyers. An annual Global Legal Skills Conference was also established as a forum for professors of Legal English and other skills professionals to exchange information on teaching methods and materials.

== See also ==
- Form book
- International Legal English Certificate
- Legal doublet
- Legal writing
- Nomenclature
- Plain Writing Act of 2010
