= Commissioner for the Ulster-Scots and the Ulster-British Tradition =

The post of Commissioner for the Ulster-Scots and the Ulster-British Tradition is an office created by the Identity and Language (Northern Ireland) Act 2022 in Northern Ireland to promote and safeguard the respective language rights of Ulster Scots speakers in the country. The Northern Ireland Executive appoints the Ulster-Scots Commissioner, as well as an Irish Language Commissioner.

== Commissioners ==
=== Lee Reynolds ===
On 28 October 2025, Lee Reynolds was appointed the first Ulster-Scots Commissioner. Reynolds was formerly a Belfast City councillor. He served as an adviser to first minister Arlene Foster until 2021.
