= Coronation roll =

Official records of British coronation ceremonies

Coronation rolls are the official written records of coronations of the British monarchy. These documents record the proceedings, ceremonial details, and participants of coronation ceremonies held at Westminster Abbey.

== History ==
The tradition of creating coronation rolls dates back to 1308, when the first known roll was created for the coronation of Edward II and Queen Isabella. These rolls were created to codify the order of ceremonial, to record who was allocated roles at the ceremony (often in return for positions or grants of land), and to maintain a record of attendance to show who had pledged loyalty to the new monarch.

== Content and format ==
Coronation rolls contain recitals of claims made to perform services at coronations and adjudications made on these claims by a Court of Claims established for each coronation. Medieval and early modern rolls (1308–1727) were written in Latin and French, with English being used from the seventeenth century onwards.

The rolls are produced by the Clerk of the Crown in Chancery, initially by senior clerks of the Chancery during the medieval period.

== Preservation ==
The majority of coronation rolls are held at The National Archives in Kew, having previously been stored at the Tower of London before being moved to the then Public Record Office in the 19th century. Only 18 coronation rolls survive today. No rolls exist for Edward III, Henry VI, Edward IV, Richard III, Henry VII, Henry VIII, Edward VI, Mary I, Elizabeth I, Charles I, or George III.

== Modern developments ==
The coronation roll of Charles III in 2023 was the first to be digitised and made publicly available online. At 21 metres long and containing 11,500 words, it significantly exceeds the 2-foot length of Edward II's 1308 roll. The roll was crafted by calligrapher Stephanie von Werthern-Gill over 56 days and illustrated by Timothy Noad, Herald-Painter at the College of Arms.
