= WSPiA Rzeszów School of Higher Education =

Private university in Rzeszów, Poland

Coordinates: 49°48′N 22°48′E

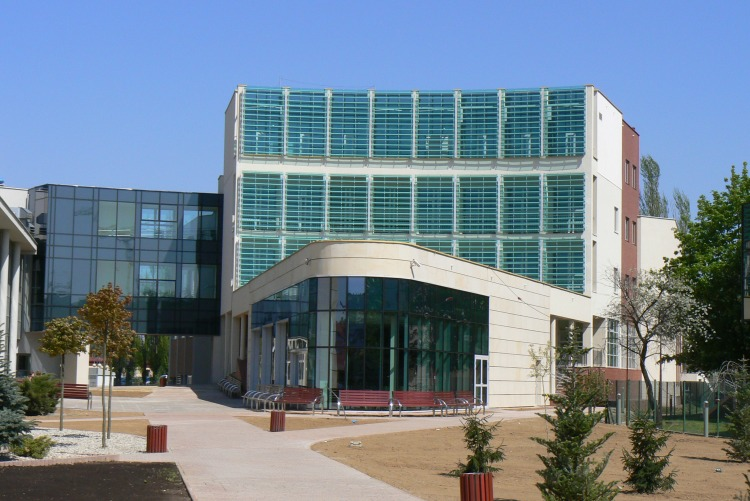
Cegielniana Rzeszow Law College, Law section of WSPiA Rzeszów School of Higher Education.

WSPiA Rzeszowska Szkoła Wyższa (WSPiA) is a private University in Podkarpacie, Poland. The oldest private University in the province, it was founded in 1995, and it entered into the register of non-public universities under the number 75. The Maria Curie-Skłodowska University in Lublin was under the patronage of the WSPiA. Until December 2007, it operated under the name of the Higher School of Administration and Management, and then University of Law and Administration in Rzeszów - Przemyśl. Currently, the university is called WSPiA Rzeszowska Szkoła Wyższa and its seat is in Rzeszów. It has the status of a non-public academic university.

WSPiA is also the City and Guilds linguistic examination center since May 2004 and TOLES since January 2011.

In 2009, about 10,000 students studied at the university. The university runs full-time and extramural studies in the following fields: Administration (1st and 2nd degree), Management (1st degree), Internal Security (1st and 2nd degree), Law (uniform master's degree). It is also the organizer of international and national scientific conferences.
