= Peremptory =

Peremptory can refer to any of the following concepts in law:

- Peremptory challenge
- Peremptory norm
- Peremptory plea
