= Northern Ireland (Ministers, Elections and Petitions of Concern) Act 2022 =

- Act of Parliament
- Parliament of the United Kingdom
- Long title: An Act to make provision about Ministerial appointments, extraordinary Assembly elections, the Ministerial Code of Conduct and petitions of concern in Northern Ireland.
- Citation: 2022 c. 2
- Introduced by: Brandon Lewis, Secretary of State for Northern Ireland (Commons); Lord Caine, Parliamentary Under-Secretary of State for Northern Ireland (Lords)
- Territorial extent: England and Wales; Scotland; Northern Ireland

Dates
- Royal assent: 8 February 2022

Other legislation
- Amends: Northern Ireland Act 1998; Northern Ireland (Stormont Agreement and Implementation Plan) Act 2016; Northern Ireland (Executive Formation and Exercise of Functions) Act 2018; Northern Ireland (Executive Formation etc) Act 2019

Status: Current legislation

History of passage through Parliament

Text of statute as originally enacted

Text of the Northern Ireland (Ministers, Elections and Petitions of Concern) Act 2022 as in force today (including any amendments) within the United Kingdom, from legislation.gov.uk.

The Northern Ireland (Ministers, Elections and Petitions of Concern) Act 2022 (c. 2) is an act of Parliament that implements parts of the New Decade, New Approach agreement made following the three-year suspension of the Northern Ireland Executive as agreed by the Government of the United Kingdom, Government of Ireland and the political parties of Northern Ireland.

== Background ==
Following the New Decade, New Approach agreement, the Democratic Unionist Party, Sinn Féin, the Ulster Unionist Party, the Social Democratic and Labour Party, and the Alliance Party entered into a power sharing Executive on 12 January 2020. This Executive, however, fell due to the resignation of the DUP First Minister over disputes surrounding the Northern Ireland Protocol.

== Provisions ==
According to the Northern Ireland Office, the legislation has the provisions of:

- Provide up to four, six-week periods for appointing Northern Ireland Ministers, including the First Minister and the deputy First Minister, after an election
- Provide up to four, six-week periods for appointing a First Minister and deputy First Minister after they cease to hold office (in the case of one of them resigning for instance)
- Provide that Northern Ireland Ministers remain in office after an election for up to a maximum of 24 weeks
- Where the First Minister and deputy First Minister cease to hold office, provide that other Northern Ireland Ministers remain in office for a maximum period of 48 weeks since the First Minister and deputy First Minister ceased to hold office or 24 weeks following the subsequent election (whichever is the shortest) unless the Secretary of State triggers the “sufficient representation” provisions;
- Implement reforms to the Petition of Concern mechanism in the Assembly, including a new 14-day consideration period before a valid petition can be confirmed
- Require petitioners to come from more than one Northern Ireland political party
- Prevent the mechanism being used for matter which concern the conduct of a member and for second reading votes on a Bill
- Update the code of conduct for Northern Ireland Ministers in accordance with a request from the Northern Ireland Executive and in line with New Decade, New Approach.
