= Pól Deeds =

Northern Irish language expert (born 1978)

Pól Deeds (born 1978) is an Irish language expert and senior civil servant. He is the first person to hold the title of Irish language Commissioner.

== Life and career ==
Deeds was born in 1978 in West Belfast, growing up in Arizona Street on the Glen Road. Prior to holding the Irish Language Commissioner post, he was the Deputy Chief Executive of Foras na Gaeilge and, for 20 years before that, he was in charge of the Irish language organisation for south and east Belfast, An Droichead.
