= Pleading in English Act 1362 =

Act of the Parliament of England

- Act of Parliament
- Parliament of England
- Long title: Pleas shall be pleaded in the English tongue, and inrolled in Latin.
- Citation: 36 Edw. 3 Stat. 1. c. 15
- Territorial extent: England and Wales; Ireland

Dates
- Royal assent: 1362
- Commencement: 28 January 1362 (Note: Fifteenth of St. Hilary next.)
- Repealed: England and Wales: 28 July 1863; Ireland: 10 August 1872

Other legislation
- Repealed by: England and Wales: Statute Law Revision Act 1863; Ireland: Statute Law (Ireland) Revision Act 1872
- Relates to: Proceedings in Courts of Justice Act 1730

Status: Repealed

Text of statute as originally enacted

The Pleading in English Act 1362 (36 Edw. 3 Stat. 1. c. 15), often rendered Statute of Pleading, was an act of the Parliament of England. The act complained that because the Norman French language was largely unknown to the common people of England, they had no knowledge of what was being said for or against them in the courts, which used Law French. The act therefore stipulated that "all Pleas which shall be pleaded in [any] Courts whatsoever, before any of his Justices whatsoever, or in his other Places, or before any of His other Ministers whatsoever, or in the Courts and Places of any other Lords whatsoever within the Realm, shall be pleaded, shewed, defended, answered, debated, and judged in the English language, and that they be entered and inrolled in Latin".

== Historical context ==
Prior to the Norman conquest of England in 1066, traditional common law in England had been discussed in the vernacular since time immemorial, and had been written in Old English since c. 600, beginning with the law code of Æthelberht of Kent. Following the Norman conquest, the Anglo-Norman French language of the conquerors was used. It developed into Law French and was used for pleadings; Latin was used for written records. The fourteenth century saw a decline in Law French, hence the Pleading in English Act, which marked the beginning of modern Legal English.

Some 50 years later, English became the language of official government in the form of Chancery Standard during the reign of Henry V (1413 to 1422).

== Subsequent developments ==
The act was extended to Ireland by Poynings' Law 1495 (10 Hen. 7. c. 22 (I)).

The whole act was repealed for England and Wales by section 1 of, and the schedule to, the Statute Law Revision Act 1863 (26 & 27 Vict. c. 125), which came into force on 28 July 1863.

The whole act was repealed for Ireland by section 1 of, and the schedule to, the Statute Law (Ireland) Revision Act 1872 (35 & 36 Vict. c. 98), which came into force on 10 August 1872.

== See also ==
- Ordinance of Villers-Cotterêts, 1539, French legislation mandating use of French in law, in place of Latin
- Sachsenspiegel, c. 1220, first legal document written in German rather than Latin
- Proceedings in Courts of Justice Act 1730
- Legal English
- Law French
