= Administration of Justice (Language) Act (Ireland) 1737 =

Act of the Parliament of Ireland

Administration of Justice (Language) Act (Ireland) 1737 (Note: Short title given by Short Titles Act (Northern Ireland) 1951 (c. 1 (N.I.)))
- Act of Parliament
- Parliament of Ireland
- Long title: An Act that all Proceedings in Courts of Justice within this Kingdom shall be in the English Language.
- Citation: 11 Geo. 2. c. 6 (I)
- Territorial extent: Ireland

Dates
- Royal assent: 23 March 1738
- Commencement: 1 January 1738 (Note: Section 1.)
- Repealed: 24 November 1962: Republic of Ireland; 26 February 2025: Northern Ireland

Other legislation
- Amended by: Statute Law Revision Act (Ireland) 1878; Statute Law Revision Act 1950
- Repealed by: Statute Law Revision (Pre-Union Irish Statutes) Act, 1962: Republic of Ireland; Identity and Language (Northern Ireland) Act 2022: Northern Ireland
- Relates to: Proceedings in Courts of Justice Act 1730

Status: Repealed

Text of statute as originally enacted

Revised text of statute as amended

Text of the Administration of Justice (Language) Act (Ireland) 1737 as in force today (including any amendments) within the United Kingdom, from legislation.gov.uk.

The Administration of Justice (Language) Act (Ireland) 1737 (11 Geo. 2. c. 6 (I)) was an act of the Parliament of Ireland, passed in 1737. The statute was primarily directed at the perceived problem caused by the widespread use of Law French and Latin in courts but has had the effect of excluding autochthonous languages, given that it excludes the use of "any other tongue or language whatsoever".

The act was controversial among Irish language advocates, because in Northern Ireland, a court proceeding could not be carried out in the Irish language. The act forbade the use of any language but English in court proceedings and all courts in the jurisdiction followed it. The equivalents of this act passed for England in 1731 and for Wales in 1733 were repealed for both countries in 1863 and in the Republic of Ireland in 1962. Northern Ireland was thus the only jurisdiction in the United Kingdom that retained this legislation after 1962.

The New Decade, New Approach agreement, which restored the devolved government in Northern Ireland on 9 January 2020, provided for legislation to amend the Northern Ireland Act 1998 that, among other changes, required repeal of the 1737 act. Provision to repeal the act was included in section 4 of the Identity and Language (Northern Ireland) Act 2022, which was put into force by the Northern Ireland Secretary in 2025.

== Subsequent developments ==
Section 6 of the act was repealed by section 1(1) of, and the first schedule to, the Statute Law Revision Act 1950 (14 Geo. 6. c. 6), which came into force on 23 May 1950.

== See also ==
- Administration of Justice Act
