= New Decade, New Approach =

Northern Irish governmental agreement

- Signed: 9 January 2020
- Location: Belfast, Northern Ireland
- Effective: 9 January 2020
- Parties: Government of the United Kingdom; Government of the Republic of Ireland; Political parties in Northern Ireland
- Language: English

New Decade, New Approach (NDNA) is a 9 January 2020 agreement which restored the government of the Northern Ireland Executive after a three-year hiatus triggered by the Renewable Heat Incentive scandal. It was negotiated by Secretary of State for Northern Ireland Julian Smith and Irish Tánaiste Simon Coveney.

On 11 January 2020, the Executive was re-formed with Arlene Foster as First Minister and Sinn Féin's Michelle O'Neill as deputy first minister following the New Decade, New Approach agreement. All five parties joined the government; other ministers include Edwin Poots (DUP); Robin Swann (UUP), Nichola Mallon (SDLP), Gordon Lyons (DUP), and Declan Kearney (SF). Alliance Party leader Naomi Long was appointed justice minister. At the first session of the assembly, Foster stated that it was "time for Stormont to move forward".

As part of the agreement, many of the proposals sought by nationalists under an Irish Language Act would be implemented by amending existing laws rather than introducing a new standalone law. Many other aspects of the policy were included in the deal.

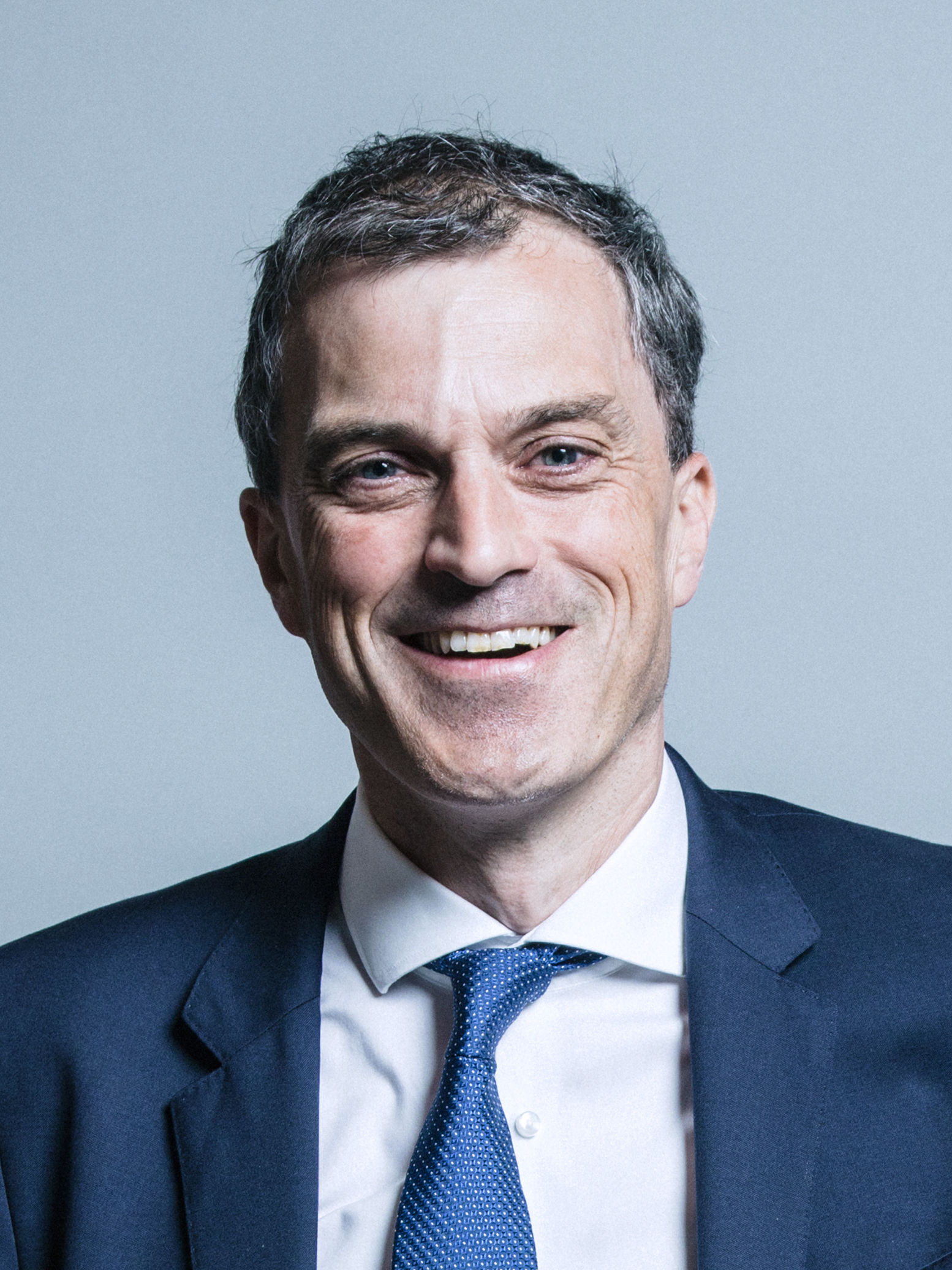
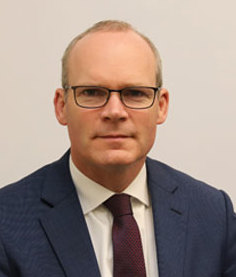
The New Decade, New Approach agreement was brokered by Secretary of State for Northern Ireland Julian Smith and Irish Tánaiste Simon Coveney.

== Background ==
=== Renewable Heat Incentive scandal ===
The Renewable Heat Incentive (RHI) scandal related to the cost of a renewable energy scheme initiated by Arlene Foster during her tenure as Minister for Enterprise, Trade and Investment. The scandal came to light in November 2016, when Foster was First Minister of Northern Ireland. Foster refused to stand aside during the enquiry, ultimately leading to the resignation of Martin McGuinness, deputy First Minister, which, under the Northern Ireland power-sharing agreement, led to the collapse of the Northern Ireland executive in January 2017.

=== Collapse of the Northern Ireland Executive ===
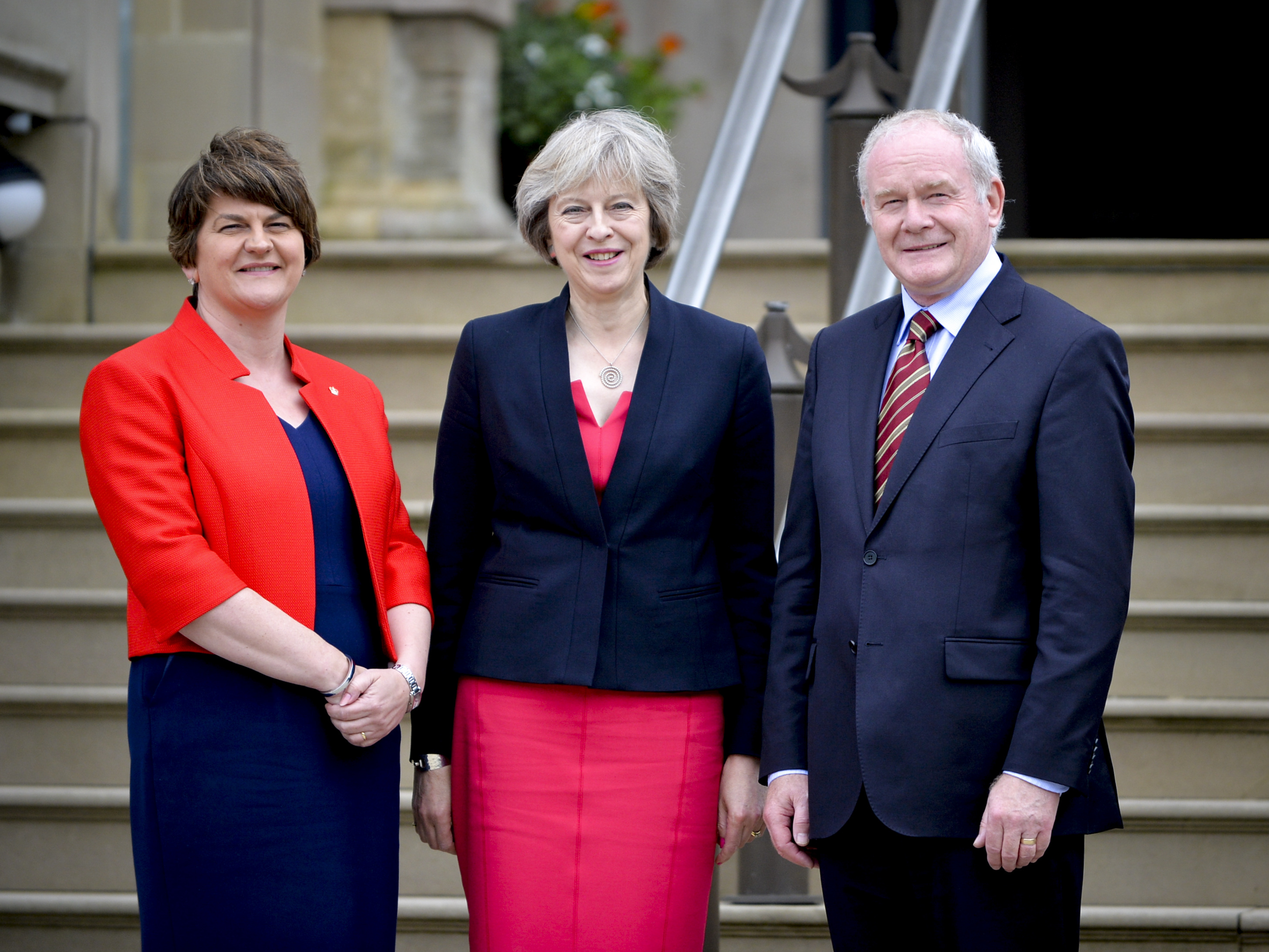
British Prime Minister Theresa May meets with First Minister Arlene Foster and deputy First Minister Martin McGuinness in 2016.

Following the collapse of the Northern Ireland executive, snap elections were held. These elections were the first in the history of Northern Ireland where unionist parties did not win a majority: this was attributed to the RHI scandal, the role of the DUP in Brexit, and demographic shifts. Under the Northern Ireland Act 1998 a further election must be held within six weeks if no executive is formed. Following the elections, talks were held and facilitated by the British and Irish Governments in order to restore the devolved administration in Northern Ireland. During this time there were two Secretaries of State for Northern Ireland: James Brokenshire and Karen Bradley, who all failed to restore the executive. In order to prevent further re-elections the British Parliament passed the Northern Ireland (Ministerial Appointments and Regional Rates) Act 2017 and Northern Ireland (Executive Formation and Exercise of Functions) Act 2018 which provided for further extensions to the deadline set in the 1998 Act, as well legislating for devolved issues such as taxation. Following the 2018 Act, the Northern Ireland (Executive Formation etc) Act 2019 was introduced to parliament to extend the deadline further. Secretary of State Julian Smith eventually restored the Executive in January 2020 under the terms of the New Decade, New Approach agreement.

=== Irish Language Act ===
Sinn Féin, the SDLP, the Alliance Party, and the Green Party, support an Irish Language Act, which is opposed by the Democratic Unionist Party and Ulster Unionist Party. The Irish Language Act (Irish: Acht na Gaeilge) is proposed legislation that would give the Irish language equal status to English in the region, similar to that of the Welsh language in Wales under the Welsh Language Act 1993.

Gerry Adams, then Sinn Féin leader, stated in August 2017 that "There won't be an assembly without an Acht na Gaeilge." According to The Independent in 2019, the Irish Language Act has become the most public issue of disagreement in discussions about restoring Stormont, and it is "almost certainly" required for a deal to be made to end the deadlock.

== Agreement ==
On 11 January 2020, Sinn Féin and the DUP re-entered devolved government under the New Decade, New Approach agreement with DUP leader Arlene Foster appointed Northern Ireland's first minister, and Sinn Féin's Michelle O'Neill appointed deputy first minister.

=== Irish language and Ulster Scots ===
As part of the agreement, there will be no standalone Irish Language Act, but the Northern Ireland Act 1998 will be amended and policies implemented to:

- grant official status to both the Irish language and Ulster Scots in Northern Ireland;
- establish the post of Irish Language Commissioner to "recognise, support, protect and enhance the development of the Irish language in Northern Ireland" as part of a new Office of Identity and Cultural Expression (alongside an Ulster Scots/Ulster British Commissioner);
- introduce sliding-scale "language standards", a similar approach to that taken for the Welsh language in Wales, although they are subject to veto by the First Minister or deputy First Minister;
- repeal a 1737 ban on the use of Irish in Northern Ireland's courts;
- allow members of the Northern Ireland Assembly to speak in Irish or Ulster Scots, with simultaneous translation for non-speakers, and
- establish a central translation unit within the Northern Ireland government.

Section 27 of the NDNA affirms the right of Northern Irish people to identify as Irish, British, or both, and promises “legislation to create a Commissioner to recognise, support, protect and enhance the development of the Irish language in Northern Ireland” and a second Commissioner “to enhance and develop the language, arts and literature associated with the Ulster Scots / Ulster British tradition”. The Assembly's Standing Orders would be amended to allow business to be conducted in the Assembly and its Committees in Irish or Ulster Scots, and a simultaneous translation system would be provided.

=== Other measures ===
The Northern Ireland (Ministers, Elections and Petitions of Concern) Act 2022 was passed by the UK Parliament to implement parts of the agreement.

=== Implementation ===
==== Priorities of the Restored Executive ====
Topic	Measure	Implementation
Transforming the health service	Industrial relations in healthcare	The agreement committed the executive to resolving the strike. In February health service unions voted to accept a pay deal. An agreement to reimburse health staff over strike was approved by the Executive.
Transforming the health service	Improving waiting times	The agreement committed the executive to reducing waiting times. Due to the COVID-19 pandemic, action to reduce waiting times in 2020 was limited. In 2025, Mike Nesbitt announced plans including cross-border surgery reimbursement to reduce waiting times.
Transforming the health service	Implementing the recommendations of certain reports	Some measures from the Bengoa, Delivering Together and Power to People reports have been implemented. For example: Digital health patient have been implemented in all Health and Social Care trusts
Transforming the health service	Reconfiguration of hospital provision	The Minister of Health, Mike Nesbitt, launched a consultation on a "reconfiguration framework" for hospitals, which included public meetings.
Transforming the health service	Delivery an extra 900 nursing and midwifery undergraduate places	In 2020, the Department of Health announced the funding of an additional 300 nursing student places. In 2023, the Department of Health announced a cut of 300 to the number of nursing student places. The Department of Health of Ireland announced it would fund 200 nursing places for students from the Republic of Ireland, with 50 places for students from Northern Ireland.
Transforming the health service	Multidisciplinary teams covering a further 100,000 patients	
Transforming the health service	Fully implement service improvements for palliative and end of life care	
Transforming the health service	In vitro fertilisation treatment	The agreement states that Executive would provide 3 funded cycles of in vitro fertilisation treatment, and this was implemented in 2024, with one cycle being fully funded.
Transforming the health service	Graduate entry medical school at Magee college	The agreement states that Executive would commit to Magee College establishing a graduate entry medical school. The medical school opened with courses starting in 2021 and first graduation in 2025.
Transforming the public services	Teachers’ industrial dispute	
Transforming the public services	Independent review of education provision	The independent review recommended that access to "early years" education should be expanded.
Transforming the public services	Integrated education	The Integrated Education Act (Northern Ireland) 2022 was passed as a private member's bill.
Transforming the public services	Address links between persistent educational underachievement and socio-economic background	Peter Weir, Minister of Education, announced the establishment of an expert panel to make recommendations to tackle educational underachievement in July 2020.
Transforming the public services	New special educational needs framework	A new special educational needs was established under the Special Educational Needs and Disability Act (Northern Ireland) 2016. Enhanced autism training was delivered for Northern Ireland teachers.
Transforming the public services	Increase police numbers to 7,500	In September 2024, The Chief Constable of the Police Service of Northern Ireland announced plans to increase officer numbers to 7,000.
Transforming the public services	Implementing recommendations in a report by Criminal Justice Inspection Northern Ireland	
Transforming the public services	Implementing recommendations made by Sir John Gillen on the handling of serious sexual offences cases.	Several recommendations of the Gillen review have been implemented. For example, victims of stalking can give evidence away from court.
Transforming the public services	Review of arm’s length bodies with a view to their rationalisation	
Investing for the future	More "big events" like The Open Championship	
Investing for the future	Reform of licensing laws	The Licensing and Registration of Clubs (Amendment) Act (Northern Ireland) 2021 was passed which changed some of reforms some aspects of licensing. A 2025 review recommended further reform.
Investing for the future	Complete both the Regional and Sub Regional Stadia Programmes	
Investing for the future	Climate mitigation	The Climate Change Act (Northern Ireland) 2022 was passed which legislated for emissions reduction targets for Northern Ireland.
Investing for the future	Climate adaptation	The draft of the third climate change adaptation plan was published in June 2025.
Investing for the future	Careers advice, curriculum, training and apprenticeships	
Investing for the future	Regionally balanced economy	The Minister for the Economy, Conor Murphy, has launched a plan to address regional economic imbalances in Northern.
Investing for the future	Delivery of essential infrastructure projects	
Investing for the future	Matching capital funding for infrastructure, regeneration and tourism projects	
Investing for the future	Invest urgently in wastewater infrastructure	The Minister for Infrastructure launched a consultation on voluntary contributions from developers to a wastewater infrastructure fund.
Developing a new Programme for Government		The first Programme for Government since 2011 was published in March 2025.

==== Northern Ireland Executive Formation Agreement ====
Topic	Measure	Implementation
Transparency, accountability and the functioning of the Executive	Accountability of ministers	The Functioning of Government (Miscellaneous Provisions) Act (Northern Ireland) 2021 was passed as a private member's bill.
Transparency, accountability and the functioning of the Executive	Ministers’ responsibility for their special advisers	The Functioning of Government (Miscellaneous Provisions) Act (Northern Ireland) 2021 was passed as a private member's bill.
Transparency, accountability and the functioning of the Executive	Ministers’ meetings with external organisations	The Functioning of Government (Miscellaneous Provisions) Act (Northern Ireland) 2021 was passed as a private member's bill.
Transparency, accountability and the functioning of the Executive	Disclosure of gifts and hospitality received by special advisers	The Functioning of Government (Miscellaneous Provisions) Act (Northern Ireland) 2021 was passed as a private member's bill.
Transparency, accountability and the functioning of the Executive	Record-keeping and the protections for whistleblowers	The Functioning of Government (Miscellaneous Provisions) Act (Northern Ireland) 2021 was passed as a private member's bill.
Transparency, accountability and the functioning of the Executive	Fiscal Council	The Northern Ireland Fiscal Council was established in 2021.
Transparency, accountability and the functioning of the Executive	Robust, independent enforcement mechanism	
Petition of Concern	Reforms to the petition of concern process to make it less common	The Northern Ireland (Ministers, Elections and Petitions of Concern) Act 2022 was passed.
Sustainability of institutions	If the institutions break down, there would be a 24-week period before an Assembly election must be called	The Northern Ireland (Ministers, Elections and Petitions of Concern) Act 2022 was passed.
Sustainability of institutions	Party Leaders’ Forum	The Party Leaders' Forum was established in 2021.
Sustainability of institutions	Executive Sub-Committee on Brexit	The Executive established a sub-committee on matters relating to the European Union and Brexit.
Sustainability of institutions	Strengthen the Opposition by allowing more time for formation	
Rights, language and identity	Office of Identity and Cultural Expression	The Identity and Language (Northern Ireland) Act 2022 was passed.
Rights, language and identity	Irish Language Act and Irish Language Commissioner	The Identity and Language (Northern Ireland) Act 2022 was passed.
Rights, language and identity	Commissioner to enhance and develop the language, arts and literature associated with the Ulster Scots / Ulster British tradition	The Identity and Language (Northern Ireland) Act 2022 was passed.
Rights, language and identity	Bill of Rights	
Rights, language and identity	Sign language	The Sign Language Bill was introduced to the Assembly in February 2025 to recognise and promote British Sign Language and Irish Sign Language .

== Aftermath ==
First Minister Arlene Foster resigned in May 2021 after the DUP signaled a no-confidence vote would be held against her. She was replaced by former Minister of Communities Paul Givan on 17 June 2021, with O'Neill staying on as deputy first minister. However, Givan himself resigned in protest in February 2022 over disputes with Westminster concerning the Northern Ireland Protocol, with early elections called for 7 May 2022. No legislation was held on the contents of the Irish Language Act prior to the 2022 Assembly election.
