= Semble =

Semble is a legal term used when discussing published opinions. The word is the Norman (and Modern) French verbal form for meaning "it seems or appears to be" or, more simply, "it seems".

== Law ==
The legal expression "semble" indicates that the point to which it refers is uncertain or represents only the judge's opinion. In a law report, the expression precedes a proposition of law which is an obiter dictum by the judge, or a suggestion by the reporter.

For example, in the headnote for House of Lords' decision in Hedley Byrne v Heller, the reporter uses the term semble when summarising certain remarks of Lords Reid, Morris, and Hodson on a point which did not arise for decision in the case; semble indicates that this may be the law, but it falls to a future case to decide authoritatively.

In Simpkins v Pays [1955], Sellers J, having made an award to the plaintiff, suggested "semble" that an equal award was due to the defendant's granddaughter, even though she was not party to the action.
