= Law French =

Archaic linguistic form used in English courts after 1066

- Lawe Frensch
- Region: British Isles
- Era: Used in English law from c. 13th century until c. 18th century
- Language family: Indo-European: Italic; Latino-Faliscan; Latinic; Romance; Italo-Western; Western; Gallo-Iberian?; Gallo-Romance; Gallo-Rhaetian?; Arpitan–Oïl; Oïl; Frankish zone; Northern Norman; Anglo-Norman; Law French
- Early forms: Old Latin: Vulgar Latin; Proto-Romance; Old Gallo-Romance; Old French; Old Norman

Language codes
- ISO 639-3: –

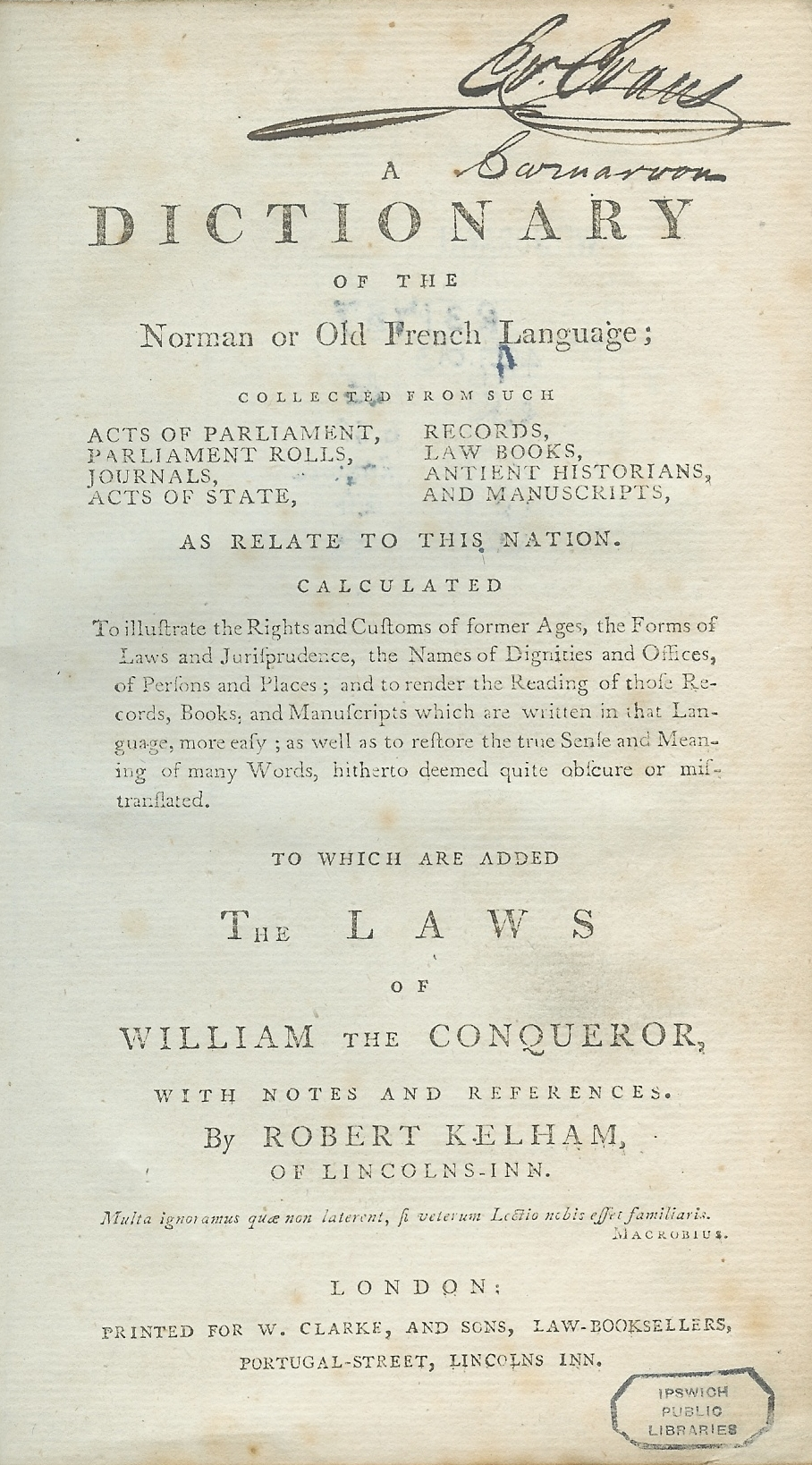
Kelham's Dictionary of the Norman or Old French Language (1779) provided English translations of Law French terms from parliamentary and legal records.

Law French (Middle English: Lawe Frensch) is an archaic language originally based on Anglo-Norman, but increasingly influenced by Parisian French and, later, English. It was used in the law courts of England from the 13th century. Its use continued for several centuries in the courts of England and Wales and Ireland. Although Law French as a narrative legal language is obsolete, many individual Law French terms continue to be used by lawyers and judges in common law jurisdictions.

== History ==
The earliest known documents in which 'French', i.e. Anglo-Norman, is used for discourse on English law date from the third quarter of the thirteenth century, and include two particular documents. The first is the 1258 Provisions of Oxford, consisting of the terms of oaths sworn by the 24 magnates appointed to rectify abuses in the rule of King Henry III, together with summaries of their rulings. The second is the Casus Placitorum (c. 1250 – c. 1270), a collection of legal maxims, rules, and brief narratives of cases.

In these works the language is already sophisticated and technical, well equipped with its own legal terminology. This includes many words that are of Latin origin, but whose forms have been shortened or distorted in a way that suggests a long history of French usage. Some examples include advowson from the Latin advocationem, meaning the legal right to nominate a parish priest; neif[e], from the Latin nātīvā, meaning a female serf, and essoyne or essone from the Latin sunnis, meaning a circumstance that exempts one from a royal summons. Later essonia replaced sunnis in Latin, thus replacing the Latin form with the French one.

Until the early fourteenth century, Law French largely coincided with the French used as an everyday language by the upper classes. As such, it reflected some of the changes that northern dialects of mainland French had undergone. Hence, in the documents mentioned above, 'of the king' is rendered as del rey, or del roy, whereas by about 1330 it had become du roi, as in modern French, or du roy.

During the 14th century, vernacular French in England suffered a rapid decline. The use of Law French was criticized by those who argued that lawyers sought to restrict entry into the legal profession. The Pleading in English Act 1362 ("Statute of Pleading") acknowledged this change by ordaining that thenceforward all court pleading must be in English, so "every Man ... may the better govern himself without offending of the Law". From that time, Law French lost much of its status as a spoken language.

Law French remained in use for the 'readings' (lectures) and 'moots' (academic debates), held in the Inns of Court as part of the education of young lawyers, but it rapidly became only a written language. It ceased to acquire new words and its grammar broke down. By about 1500, gender was often neglected, giving rise to une home ('a (feminine) man') or un feme ('a (masculine) woman'). More and more of its vocabulary became English, as it was only used by English, Welsh, and Irish lawyers and judges who often spoke no real French.

In the seventeenth century, the moots and readings fell into neglect, and the rule of Oliver Cromwell, with its emphasis on removing the relics of archaic ritual from legal and governmental processes, struck a further blow to the language. Even before then, in 1628, Sir Edward Coke acknowledged in his preface to the First Part of the Institutes of the Law of England, that Law French had almost ceased to be a spoken tongue. It was still used for case reports and legal textbooks until almost the end of the seventeenth century, but only in an anglicized form.

The Proceedings in Courts of Justice Act 1730 made English, instead of Law French and Latin, the obligatory language for use in the courts of England and in the court of exchequer in Scotland. It was later extended to Wales, and seven years later a similar act was passed in Ireland, the Administration of Justice (Language) Act (Ireland) 1737.

=== Example ===
A frequently quoted example of the heavily anglicised form of Law French that was for case reports and legal textbooks until almost the end of the seventeenth century comes from one of Chief Justice Sir George Treby's marginal notes in an annotated edition of Dyer's Reports, published 1688:

Richardson Chief Justice de Common Banc al assises de Salisbury in Summer 1631 fuit assault per prisoner la condemne pur felony, que puis son condemnation ject un brickbat a le dit justice, que narrowly mist, et pur ceo immediately fuit indictment drawn per Noy envers le prisoner et son dexter manus ampute et fix al gibbet, sur que luy mesme immediatement hange in presence de Court.

The modern English translation is as follows:

"Richardson, Chief Justice of the Common Bench at the Assizes at Salisbury in Summer 1631 was assaulted by a prisoner there condemned for felony, who, following his condemnation, threw a brickbat at the said justice that narrowly missed, and for this, immediately [there] was an indictment drawn by Noy against the prisoner and his right hand was cut off and fastened to the gibbet, on which he himself was immediately hanged in the presence of the Court.

Below is a highly-literal translation to Modern French using cognates, that should be mostly parseable to a fluent speaker. Non-cognates are indicated in square brackets.

Richardson Chef Justice de Commun Banc au assises de Salisbury en [Été] 1631 fût assailli par prisonnier là condamné pour félonie, qui puis son condamnation jeta un [morceau de] brique au dit justice, que [étroitement rate], et pour ça immédiatement fût enditement [rédigé] par Noy envers le prisonnier et son droit main amputé et fixé au gibet, sur que lui même immédiatement [pendu] en présence de Court.

The macaronic nature of this production can be more easily seen if it is reproduced with the various languages formatted as such: English, French, 'Latin', ambiguously French or Latin, ambiguously French or English.

Richardson Chief Justice de Common Banc al assises de Salisbury in Summer 1631 fuit assault per prisoner la condemne pur felony, que puis son condemnation ject un brickbat a le dit justice, que narrowly mist, et pur ceo immediately fuit indictment drawn per Noy envers le prisoner et son 'dexter manus' ampute et fix al gibbet, sur que luy mesme immediatement hange in presence de Court.

Much of the ambiguous vocabulary represents what would be correctly spelled English or Latin, but oddly-spelled or period-inappropriate vocabulary in French; even under the most favourable analysis, the note represents usage of multiple forms of French, English, and Latin simultaneously. Treby did not even use the term pendu 'hanged', a familiar concept and common at the time. Interestingly, one can observe the use of both the French and English words for "immediately" and the use of Old French (ceo) and Latin ('fuit') forms for core vocabulary, i.e. "this" and "was" respectively.

== Survivals in modern legal terminology ==
The postpositive adjectives in many legal noun phrases in English—attorney general, fee simple—are a heritage from Law French. Native speakers of French may not understand certain Law French terms not used in modern French or replaced by other terms. For example, the current French word for "mortgage" is hypothèque. Many of the terms of Law French were converted into modern English in the 20th century to make the law more understandable in common-law jurisdictions. Some key Law French terms remain, including the following:

Term or phrase	Literal translation	Definition and use
arson	burning	From Old French arsion, from Late Latin ārsiōnem "a burning," (acc.) from the verb ardēre, "to burn." The original Old English term for illegal burning was bernet, bærnet.
assizes	sittings (Old French assise, sitting)	Sitting of the court held in different places throughout a province or region.
attorney	appointed (Old French atorné)	attorney-at-law (lawyer, equivalent to a solicitor and barrister) or attorney-in-fact (one who has power of attorney).
autrefois acquit or autrefois convict	acquitted (literally 'acquired') / convicted another time	peremptory pleas that one was previously acquitted or convicted of the same offence.
bailiff	Anglo-Norman baillis, baillif "steward; administrator", from bail "custody, charge, office"	1. Court bailiff: marshal of the court; a court attendant; any person to whom authority, guardianship or jurisdiction is entrusted whose main duty is keeping order in the courtroom.; 2. Bound bailiff or bum-bailiff: person employed by the sheriff to serve writs, execute court orders, collect debts, and in some regions, make arrests. In some regions, the bailiff is bound to the sheriff with sureties for the proper execution of the office.
charterparty	Originally charte partie (split paper)	contract between an owner and a hirer (charterer) over a ship.
cestui que trust, cestui que use	shortened form of cestui a que use le feoffment fuit fait, "the one for whose use the feoffment was made", and cestui a que use le trust est créé, "the one for whom the trust is created"	sometimes shortened to cestui; the beneficiary of a trust.
chattel	property, goods (Old French chatel, ultimately from Latin capitale)	personal property
chose	thing (from Latin causa, "cause")	thing, usually as in phrases: "chose in action" and "chose in possession".
culprit	Originally cul. prit, abbreviation of Culpable: prest (d'averrer nostre bille), meaning "guilty, ready (to prove our case)", words used by prosecutor in opening a trial.	guilty party
cy-près doctrine	"so near/close" and can be translated as "as near as possible" or "as near as may be"	the power of a court to transfer the property of one charitable trust to another charitable trust when the first trust may no longer exist or be able to operate.
defendant	"defending" (Anglo-Norman: défendant)	the party against whom a criminal proceeding is brought.
demise	"to send away", from démettre	Transfer, usually of real property, but also of the Crown on the monarch's death or abdication, whence the modern colloquial meaning "end, downfall, death".
de son tort	"by their wrong", i.e. as a result of their own wrong act	acting and liable but without authorization; e.g. executor de son tort, trustee de son tort, agent de son tort, guardian de son tort.
en ventre sa mere	"in its mother's womb"	foetus in utero or in vitro but for beneficial purposes legally born.
escheats	Anglo-Norman eschete, escheoite "reversion of property" (gave the legal French verb échoir)	Pre-1660: reversion of unclaimed property to a feudal lord, or the state where the property is allodial.; Post-1660: After the Tenures Abolition Act 1660, which changed all tenures to free and common socage, the only revenue-generating incidents that remained were escheat, whereby land returned to the Crown if a landholder died both intestate and heirless, and forfeiture, whereby land held by the grantee convicted of treason forfeited to the Crown.; Present day: The reversion of land to the Crown when a person possessed of the fee dies intestate (i.e., no will) and without heirs (see Bona vacantia). Land seldom reverts to the Crown, because it is freely alienable by way of sale, will or inheritance. As long as the land is disposed of in one of these three ways it does not revert to the Crown.
escrow	Anglo-Norman escrowe, from Old French escro(u)e "scrap of paper, scroll of parchment"	a contractual arrangement in which a third party receives and disburses money or property for the primary transacting parties, with the disbursement dependent on conditions agreed to by the transacting parties
estoppel	Anglo-Norman estoup(p)ail "plug, stopper, bung"	prevention of a party from contradicting a position previously taken.
estovers	"that which is necessary"	wood that tenants may be entitled to from the land in which they have their interest.
feme covert vs. feme sole	"covered woman" vs. "single woman"	the legal status of adult married women and unmarried women, respectively, under the coverture principle of common law.
force majeure	modern French, "superior force"	clause in some contracts that frees parties from liability for acts of God.
grand jury	"large jury" (q.v.)	a legal body empowered to conduct official proceedings and investigate potential criminal conduct, and determine whether criminal charges should be brought.
in pais	"in the countryside"	out of court, extrajudicial: (1) settlement in pais: voluntary amicable settlement reached without legal proceedings; (2) matter in pais: matter to be proved solely by witness testimony unsupported by any judicial record or other documentary or tangible evidence; (3) estoppel in pais: estoppel in respect of out-of-court statements; (4) trial per pais: trial by jury.
jury	Anglo-Norman jurée "oath, legal inquiry"	a group of citizens sworn for a common purpose.
laches	Anglo-Norman lachesse "slackness, laxness"	Under English common law, the unnecessary delaying bringing an action against a party for failure to perform is known as the doctrine of laches. The doctrine holds that a court may refuse to hear a case not brought before it after a lengthy period since the right of action arose.
larceny	Anglo-Norman: lar(e)cin "theft"	theft of personal property.
mainprise, mainprize		undertaking for the appearance of an accused at trial, given to a magistrate or court even without having the accused in custody; mainpernor is the promisor.
market overt	open market	a designated market in which sales of stolen goods to bona fide purchasers are deemed to pass good title to the goods.
mortgage	dead pledge (Old French: mort gaige)	now a variety of security interests, either made by conveyance or hypothecation, but originally a pledge by which the landowner remained in possession of the property that the landowner staked as security.
mortmain	dead hand	perpetual, inalienable ownership of land by the "dead hand" of an organization, usually the church.
oyer et terminer	to hear and determine	US: court of general criminal jurisdiction in some states; UK: commission or writ empowering a judge to hear and rule on a criminal case at the assizes.
parol evidence rule	word, speech (ultimately from Latin parabola, speech)	a substantive rule of contract law which precludes extrinsic evidence from altering the terms of an unambiguous fully expressed contract.
parole	word, speech (ultimately from Latin parabola, speech)	the release of prisoners based on giving their word of honour to abide by certain restrictions.
peine forte et dure	strong and harsh punishment	torture, in particular to force a defendant to enter a plea.
per my et per tout	by half and by whole	describes a joint tenancy: by the half for purposes of survivorship, by the whole for purposes of alienation.
petit jury	small jury (q.v.)	a trial jury, now usually just referred to as a jury.
plaintiff	complaining (from plaintif)	the person who begins a lawsuit.
prochein ami	close friend	Law French for what is now more usually called next friend (or, in England and Wales, following the Woolf Reforms, a litigation friend). Refers to one who files a lawsuit on behalf of another not capable of acting on their own behalf, such as a minor.
profit a prendre	profit to take	also known as the right of common, where one has the right to take the "fruits" of the property of another, such as mining rights, growing rights, etc.
prout de jure	in proportion to law, from Latin adverb prout, "just as" and jus, "law"	Scots law term; proof at large; all evidence is allowed in court.
pur autre vie vs. cestui que vie	"during the term of another person's life" vs. "during the term of one's life"	1. Used in life tenancy and lease arrangements 2. In the rights and obligations of the freehold, an heir or tenant has the rights to emblements from the life estate in certain cases (i.e., life estate terminated by a death).
recovery		originally a procedural device for clarifying the ownership of land, involving a stylised lawsuit between fictional litigants.
remainder	to remain	originally a substitution-term in a will or conveyance, to be brought into play if the primary beneficiary were to die or fail to fulfil certain conditions.
replevin	from plevir "to pledge", which in turn is from the Latin replegio "redeem a thing taken by another"	a suit to recover personal property unlawfully taken.
semble	"it seems" or "it seems or appears to be"	The legal expression "semble" indicates that the point to which it refers is uncertain or represents only the judge's opinion. In a law report, the expression precedes a proposition of law which is an obiter dictum by the judge, or a suggestion by the reporter.
terre-tenant	land-holding	person who has the actual possession of land; used specifically for (1) someone owing a rentcharge, (2) owner in fee of land acquired from a judgment debtor after judgment creditor's lien has attached.
torts	from medieval Latin tortum "wrong, injustice", neuter past participle of Latin torquo, "I twist"	civil wrongs.
treasure trove	from tresor trouvé "found treasure"	treasure found by chance, as opposed to one stolen, inherited, bought, etc. Trove is properly an adjective, but colloquially now used as a noun, meaning a collection of treasure, whether it is legally treasure trove or not. In the UK (except Scotland), the legal term is now simply treasure.
voir dire	literally "to say the truth"; the word voir (or voire) in this combination comes from Old French and derives from Latin verum, "that which is true". It is not related to the modern French word voir, which derives from Latin video ("I see"); but instead to the adverb voire ("even", from Latin vera, "true things") as well as the adjective vrai ("true") as in the fossilised expression à vrai dire ("to say the truth").	in the United States, the questions a prospective juror or witness must answer to determine their qualification to serve; or, in the law of both England and Wales and the United States a "trial-within-a-trial" held to determine the admissibility of evidence (for example, an accused's alleged confession), i.e. whether the jury (or judge where there is no jury) may receive it.

== See also ==
- French language
- Norman language
- French phrases used by English speakers
- English words of French origin
- Influence of French on English
- Jersey Legal French
- Franglais
- List of legal Latin terms
- Legal English

== Literature ==
- Manual of Law French by J. H. Baker, 1979.
- The Mastery of the French Language in England by B. Clover, 1888.
- "The salient features of the language of the earlier year books" in Year Books 10 Edward II, pp. xxx–xlii. M. D. Legge, 1934.
- "Of the Anglo-French Language in the Early Year Books" in Year Books 1 & 2 Edward II, pp. xxxiii–lxxxi. F. W. Maitland, 1903.
- The Anglo-Norman Dialect by L. E. Menger, 1904.
- From Latin to Modern French, with especial Consideration of Anglo-Norman by M. K. Pope, 1956.
- L'Evolution du Verbe en Anglo-Français, XIIe-XIVe Siècles by F. J. Tanquerey, 1915.
