= International Legal English Certificate =

Legal English certificate

The International Legal English Certificate (ILEC) was a high-level English language qualification for lawyers. The ILEC exam was discontinued in December 2016.
