= Proceedings in Courts of Justice Act 1730 =

Act of the Parliament of Great Britain

- Act of Parliament
- Parliament of Great Britain
- Long title: An Act that all Proceedings in the Courts of Justice within that Part of Great Britain called England, and in the Court of Exchequer in Scotland, shall be in the English Language.
- Citation: 4 Geo. 2. c. 26
- Territorial extent: Great Britain

Dates
- Royal assent: 7 May 1731
- Commencement: 25 March 1733 (Note: Section 1.)
- Repealed: 15 August 1879
Other legislation
Amended by	Receipt of the Exchequer Act 1732; Courts in Wales and Chester Act 1732; Statute Law Revision Act 1867
Repealed by	Civil Procedure Acts Repeal Act 1879
Relates to	Administration of Justice (Language) Act (Ireland) 1737

Status: Repealed

Text of statute as originally enacted

The Proceedings in Courts of Justice Act 1730 (4 Geo. 2. c. 26) was an act of the Parliament of Great Britain which made English (instead of Law French and Latin) the obligatory language for use in the courts of England and in the court of exchequer in Scotland. The act followed a medieval law, the Pleading in English Act 1362 (36 Edw. 3. c. 15), which had made it permissible to debate cases in English, but all written records had continued to be in Latin. The 1730 act was amended shortly later by the Courts in Wales and Chester Act 1732 (6 Geo. 2. c. 14) to extend it to the courts in Wales, and by the Receipt of the Exchequer Act 1732 (c. 26) to exempt from its provisions the "court of the receipt of his Majesty's exchequer" in England. It never applied to cases heard overseas in the court of admiralty.

A similar act was passed on 22 November 1650 by the Rump Parliament during the Commonwealth of England: An Act for turning the Books of the Law and all Process and Proceedings in Courts of Justice into the English Tongue. As with all purported acts passed without royal assent during the republican period, it was declared void on the restoration of Charles II.

The act was introduced by the then Lord Chancellor, Lord King, and came into force on 25 March 1733. It was repealed by the Civil Procedure Acts Repeal Act 1879 (42 & 43 Vict. c. 59). Despite this repeal, in 2013 the Supreme Court of Canada held that the act still applied in British Columbia, as the law of England: "The 1731 Act was received into B.C. law and is in force in that province, pursuant to the requirements of s. 2 of the Law and Equity Act [...]." The law in force in England as of November 19, 1858 was received in British Columbia, and, unless abrogated, remained in force.

A similar act was passed by the Parliament of Ireland, the Administration of Justice (Language) Act (Ireland) 1737 (11 Geo. 2. c. 6 (I)).

== Subsequent developments ==
The whole act was repealed by section 2 of, and part I of the schedule to, the Civil Procedure Acts Repeal Act 1879 (42 & 43 Vict. c. 59), which came into force on 15 August 1879.

== See also ==
- Ordinance of Villers-Cotterêts, French law mandating legal use of French, rather than Latin
- Court hand
