= Identity and Language (Northern Ireland) Act 2022 =

Legislation in Northern Ireland

- Act of Parliament
- Parliament of the United Kingdom
- Long title: An Act to make provision about national and cultural identity and language in Northern Ireland.
- Citation: 2022 c. 45
- Introduced by: Shailesh Vara (Commons); Lord Caine, Parliamentary Under-Secretary of State for Northern Ireland (Lords)
- Territorial extent: Northern Ireland

Dates
- Royal assent: 6 December 2022
- Commencement: See section 10
Other legislation
Repeals/revokes	Administration of Justice (Language) Act (Ireland) 1737

Status: Partly in force

History of passage through Parliament

Text of statute as originally enacted

Text of the Identity and Language (Northern Ireland) Act 2022 as in force today (including any amendments) within the United Kingdom, from legislation.gov.uk.

The Identity and Language (Northern Ireland) Act 2022 (c. 45) (Irish: Acht Féiniúlachta agus Teanga (Tuaisceart Éireann) 2022) is an act of Parliament in the United Kingdom providing "official recognition of the status of the Irish language" in Northern Ireland, with Ulster Scots being an officially recognised minority language.

The act was first envisioned as an Irish Language Act (Irish: Acht na Gaeilge) of the Northern Ireland Assembly that would give the Irish language equal status to English in the region, similar to that of the Welsh language in Wales under the Welsh Language Act 1993.

== Main provisions ==
The bill includes the following provisions:

- Official recognition and protection of the Irish language
- Development of the Ulster Scots and Ulster British tradition
- Two commissioners appointed, an Irish Language Commissioner and a Commissioner for the Ulster-Scots and the Ulster-British Tradition
- The creation of an Office of Identity and Cultural Expression
- £4 million investment in an Irish language investment fund.

The provisions on the Irish language were based on the model of the Welsh Language Act 1993.

== Background ==
The proportion of respondents in the 2011 census aged 3 and above who stated that they can speak Irish.

About 184,898 (10.65%) Northern Irish people have some knowledge of Irish, while about 4,130 (0.2%) speak it as their vernacular.

Before the act, the status of the Irish language as a minority language was guaranteed by the European Charter for Regional or Minority Languages. This continues to bind the United Kingdom. Since 2008, the Irish republican party Sinn Féin has been advocating that these protections be strengthened by legislation.

=== Support and opposition ===
The legislation was supported by An Dream Dearg, Conradh na Gaeilge, POBAL, Sinn Féin, the Social Democratic and Labour Party (SDLP), the Alliance Party, the Green Party and People Before Profit. It was opposed by the Democratic Unionist Party (DUP) and the Ulster Unionist Party (UUP).

Irish language activist and unionist Linda Ervine stated that she had come to support the legislation after comments by DUP MLA Gregory Campbell mocking the Irish language. She said that the act would have little effect on non-Irish speakers and that some politicians had engaged in "scaremongering". When a draft bill was leaked after talks stalled in 2018, Irish language groups criticised the legislation for not going far enough, specifically in not creating new rights for Irish speakers. Meanwhile, DUP supporters condemned the compromise legislation.

In 2017, pressure group An Dream Dearg organised a rally in favour of the act in Belfast, attracting several thousand supporters. In May 2019, more than 200 prominent Irish people signed an open letter urging then Republic of Ireland Taoiseach Leo Varadkar and then Prime Minister of the UK Theresa May to support the act.

Then DUP leader Arlene Foster has stated that it would make more sense to pass a "Polish Language Act" than an Irish Language Act, because more Northern Ireland residents speak Polish than Irish. This claim was disputed by fact checkers. Foster also stated that "If you feed a crocodile they're going to keep coming back and looking for more" with regard to Sinn Féin's demands for the act and accused the party of "using the Irish language as a tool to beat Unionism over the head."

== History ==
Sinn Féin and POBAL, the Northern Irish association of Irish speakers, pointed out that the British government promised to introduce such an act in the 2006 St Andrews Agreement. Unionists said that they never supported such a commitment. As part of the January 2020 New Decade, New Approach compromise agreement, many of the proposals sought under an Irish Language Act would be implemented by amending existing laws rather than introducing a new standalone law.

=== Proposed provisions (2014, 2017) ===
In 2014, legislation sought by Sinn Féin would appoint an Irish language commissioner and designate Gaeltacht areas. It would also provide for the right to use Irish:

- in the judicial system
- in the Northern Ireland Assembly (Stormont)
- with public sector services
- in Irish-medium education
- on bilingual signage.

In 2017, Conradh na Gaeilge (an all-island non-political social and cultural organisation which promotes the language in Ireland and worldwide) proposed an Act that would provide for

- the official status of the language
- Irish in the Assembly
- Irish in local government
- Irish and the BBC
- Irish in the Department of Education;
- the role of a Language Commissioner
- placenames.

Other proposals have included replicating the Welsh Language Act 1993 and Gaelic Language (Scotland) Act 2005.

=== Role in political deadlock (2017 to 2020) ===
In January 2017, then Sinn Féin Deputy First Minister Martin McGuinness resigned in protest over the Renewable Heat Incentive scandal, and the party declined to replace him. Due to Northern Ireland's power-sharing system, a government cannot be formed without both parties, and the Stormont Assembly was suspended.

Gerry Adams, then Sinn Féin leader, stated in August 2017 that "There won't be an assembly without an Acht na Gaeilge." According to The Independent in 2019, the Irish Language Act became the most public issue of disagreement in discussions about restoring Stormont, and it was "almost certainly" required for a deal to be made to end the deadlock.

=== Compromise (2020 to 2022) ===
The proportion of respondents in the 2011 census in Northern Ireland aged 3 and above who stated that they could speak Ulster Scots

On 11 January 2020, Sinn Féin and the DUP re-entered devolved government under the New Decade, New Approach agreement with then DUP leader Arlene Foster appointed Northern Ireland's first minister, and Sinn Féin's Michelle O'Neill appointed deputy first minister. In the agreement, there would be no standalone Irish Language Act, but the Northern Ireland Act 1998 would be amended and policies implemented to:

- grant official status to both the Irish language and Ulster Scots in Northern Ireland;
- establish the post of Irish Language Commissioner to "recognise, support, protect and enhance the development of the Irish language in Northern Ireland" as part of a new Office of Identity and Cultural Expression (alongside a Commissioner for the Ulster-Scots and the Ulster-British Tradition);
- introduce sliding-scale "language standards", a similar approach to that taken for the Welsh language in Wales, although they are subject to veto by the First Minister or deputy First Minister;
- repeal a 1737 ban on the use of Irish in Northern Ireland's courts;
- allow members of the Northern Ireland Assembly to speak in Irish or Ulster Scots, with simultaneous translation for non-speakers, and
- establish a central translation unit within the Northern Ireland government.

By 11 January 2021 there was a commitment to the forming an Office of Identity and Cultural Expression but real progress was limited. The Executive Office estimated an allocation of £28m in funds, with potential for increase would be dedicated to the improvement of the status of the Irish language, but there was debate over how the funds would be divided and dispersed.

Debate on the exact language of the act stalled in the assembly throughout 2021, with the 'titles of commissioners' reportedly being a concern. In 2022, with an early election called for that May, it was announced no such legislation would be enacted before the end of the legislative period.

=== In the Parliament of the United Kingdom (2022) ===
Ultimately, the legislation was enacted by the Parliament of the United Kingdom. The Identity and Language (Northern Ireland) Bill was introduced in the House of Lords on 25 May 2022 and scrutiny there was concluded on 13 July. The bill received its first reading in the House of Commons the following day and its second reading on 12 October. The recorded vote on second reading received support across the political spectrum, with the only four no votes coming from the Democratic Unionist Party. Sinn Fein, who maintain a policy of abstentionism regarding Westminster, did not vote. The bill passed in the House of Commons with its third reading on 26 October. On 6 December, the act received royal assent, meaning that Irish would become an official language in Northern Ireland once the relevant provisions are brought into force.

== See also ==
- Gaelic Language (Scotland) Act 2005
- Welsh Language Act 1993
- Official Languages Act 2003 (act passed in the Republic of Ireland)
