= TOLES =

Professional legal English language proficiency examination

TOLES (Test of Legal English Skills) is a vocational English language examination designed to assess the ability of non-native English speakers to use English in professional legal contexts. It is primarily intended for lawyers, law students, and legal professionals who require English for international or commercial legal work. The examination evaluates language proficiency rather than legal knowledge and focuses on the functional use of English in professional legal communication.

== History and purpose ==
TOLES was established in 2000 in response to demand from law firms and legal employers for a specialized assessment of legal English proficiency. As international and cross-border legal practice expanded, employers sought a standardized method of evaluating candidates’ ability to work effectively in English-language legal environments. The examination was developed by legal English specialists and is associated with Global Legal English, part of the International Division of the Law Society of England and Wales.

The purpose of TOLES is to measure practical language skills required in professional legal environments rather than academic or theoretical legal knowledge. It was designed to provide an objective benchmark for English language competence in legal workplaces and international legal practice.

Because of the specialized register of legal English, TOLES is not formally aligned with the Common European Framework of Reference for Languages (CEFR). Its developers state that the language used in professional legal practice differs from that assessed by general language proficiency frameworks. TOLES certificates do not expire and remain valid for life.

== Examination structure ==
TOLES is offered at three principal levels that correspond to increasing proficiency in legal English.

=== TOLES Foundation ===
TOLES Foundation is designed for candidates with elementary to lower-intermediate English proficiency. It assesses basic legal vocabulary, grammar, and reading comprehension in simplified legal contexts. The examination focuses on understanding brief legal texts and applying appropriate language in straightforward professional situations.

=== TOLES Higher ===
TOLES Higher is intended for candidates with intermediate proficiency in legal English. It evaluates reading, writing, and listening skills through more complex legal scenarios, including professional correspondence, contracts, and procedural documents. Candidates are required to demonstrate broader vocabulary knowledge and increased grammatical accuracy in legal communication.

=== TOLES Advanced ===
TOLES Advanced represents the highest level of the examination. It is designed for advanced learners of legal English and assesses the ability to interpret and produce sophisticated legal texts using specialized terminology and complex grammatical structures relevant to professional legal practice.

Candidates receive a percentage score and performance band rather than a pass–fail result. This scoring system provides a more detailed indication of proficiency in legal English and allows institutions and employers to interpret results with greater precision.

== Content and skills assessed ==
TOLES examinations assess functional language skills used in professional legal environments. Test materials are based on scenarios commonly encountered in legal practice and international commercial law.

The examination evaluates:

- Legal vocabulary and terminology used in contracts and professional correspondence
- Grammar and syntax in formal legal writing
- Reading comprehension of legal documents such as agreements, memoranda, and procedural texts
- Written communication in professional legal contexts
- Listening comprehension in legal and professional scenarios (at certain levels)

The tests are designed to reflect real-world legal language tasks and do not require knowledge of a specific national legal system. This focus distinguishes TOLES from academic law examinations and from general English language proficiency tests that assess broader linguistic competence rather than specialized professional usage.

== Recognition and use ==
TOLES certificates are used by individuals and organizations as evidence of legal English proficiency. They are recognized internationally by employers, law firms, corporate legal departments, and some academic institutions as a practical benchmark for professional legal language competence.

The examination is delivered through authorized exam centers and training providers, indicating its use beyond the official issuing organization. Legal English schools and language institutions in multiple countries offer preparatory courses aligned with the TOLES examination framework.

TOLES is frequently used as an external assessment tool by legal English teachers and training programs to evaluate student progress and professional readiness.

== Eligibility ==
TOLES is primarily intended for non-native speakers of English who are studying law or working in the legal profession. Typical candidates include law students, trainee lawyers, paralegals, and legal professionals preparing for work in English-speaking or international legal environments.

There are no formal prerequisites for taking the examination. Candidates may select the level appropriate to their language proficiency. Although a law degree is not required, familiarity with basic legal concepts is beneficial due to the professional nature of the test materials.

== Preparation and delivery ==
TOLES examinations may be taken online or at authorized test centers, depending on regional availability, allowing for accessibility similar to other international professional language tests.

Preparation resources include practice papers, textbooks, training courses, and preparatory classes offered by language schools and legal English specialists. Many candidates prepare through university-based legal English programs, private language institutions, or independent self-study using official and third-party materials.

== See also ==
- English for specific purposes
