= Obiter dictum =

Common legal term; "other things said"

Obiter dictum (usually used in the plural, obiter dicta) is a Latin phrase meaning "said in passing". In a legal system, the term may apply to any remark in a legal opinion that is "said in passing" by a judge or arbitrator. The concept as used in law derives from English common law, whereby a judgment comprises only two elements: ratio decidendi and obiter dicta. For the purposes of judicial precedent, ratio decidendi is binding, whereas obiter dicta are persuasive only.

== Significance ==
A judicial statement can be ratio decidendi only if it refers to the crucial facts and law of the case. Statements that are not crucial, or which refer to hypothetical facts or to unrelated law issues, are obiter dicta. Obiter dicta (often simply dicta, or obiter) are remarks or observations made by a judge that, although included in the body of the court's opinion, do not form a necessary part of the court's decision. In a court opinion, obiter dicta include, but are not limited to, words "introduced by way of illustration, or analogy or argument". Unlike ratio decidendi, obiter dicta are not the subject of the judicial decision, even if they happen to be correct statements of law. The so-called Wambaugh's Inversion Test provides that to determine whether a judicial statement is ratio or obiter, you should invert the argument, that is to say, ask whether the decision would have been different, had the statement been omitted. If so, the statement is crucial and is ratio; whereas if it is not crucial, it is obiter.

If a court rules that it lacks jurisdiction to hear a case (or dismisses the case on a technicality), but still goes on to offer opinions on the merits of the case, such opinions may constitute obiter dicta. Other instances of obiter dicta may occur where a judge makes an aside to provide context for the opinion, or makes a thorough exploration of a relevant area of law. If a judge, by way of illumination, provides a hypothetical example, this would be obiter even if relevant because it would not be on the facts of the case, as in the Carlill case (below).

University of Florida scholars Teresa Reid-Rambo and Leanne Pflaum explain the process by which obiter dicta may become binding. They write that:

In reaching decisions, courts sometimes quote passages of obiter dicta found in the texts of the opinions from prior cases, with or without acknowledging the quoted passage's status as obiter dicta. A quoted passage of obiter dicta may become part of the holding or ruling in a subsequent case, depending on what the latter court actually decided and how that court treated the principle embodied in the quoted passage.

== In the United Kingdom ==
Under the doctrine of stare decisis, statements constituting obiter dicta are not binding, although in some jurisdictions, such as England and Wales, they can be strongly persuasive. For instance, in the High Trees case, Mr Justice Denning was not content merely to grant the landlord's claim, but added that had the landlord sought to recover the back rent from the war years, equity would have estopped him from doing so. Given that the landlord did not wish to recover any back rent, Denning's addition was clearly obiter, yet this statement became the basis for the modern revival of promissory estoppel. Similarly, in Hedley Byrne & Co Ltd v Heller & Partners Ltd, the House of Lords held, obiter, that negligent misstatement could give rise to a claim for pure economic loss, even though, on the facts, a disclaimer was effective in quashing any claim. Also, in Scruttons Ltd v Midland Silicones Ltd, Lord Reid proposed that while doctrine of privity of contract prevented the stevedores in this instance from benefiting from protection of an exemption clause, in future such protection could be effective if four guidelines (which he went on to list) were all met. In Carlill v Carbolic Smoke Ball Company (a case whether a woman who had used a smoke ball as prescribed could claim the advertised reward after catching influenza), Bowen LJ said:

If I advertise to the world that my dog is lost, and that anybody who brings the dog to a particular place will be paid some money, are all the police or other persons whose business it is to find lost dogs to be expected to sit down and write me a note saying that they have accepted my proposal? Why, of course [not]!

== In the United States ==
The United States Supreme Court's obiter dicta can be influential. One example in the Supreme Court's history is the 1886 case Santa Clara County v. Southern Pacific Railroad Co.. A passing remark from Chief Justice Morrison R. Waite, recorded by the court reporter before oral argument, now forms the basis for the doctrine that juristic persons are entitled to protection under the Fourteenth Amendment. Whether or not Chief Justice Waite's remark constitutes binding precedent is arguable, but subsequent rulings treat it as such.

In other instances, obiter dicta can suggest an interpretation of law that has no bearing on the case at hand but might be useful in future cases. The most notable instance of such an occurrence is the history of the famous Footnote 4 to United States v. Carolene Products Co. (1938), which, while rejecting use of the Due Process Clause to block most legislation, suggested that the clause might be applied to strike down legislation dealing with questions of "fundamental right". This obiter dictum is generally considered to have led to the doctrine of strict scrutiny (and subsequently intermediate scrutiny) in racial-, religious-, and sexual-discrimination cases, first articulated in Korematsu v. United States (1944). The judgment of Korematsu v. United States was itself condemned by the same court in obiter dictum in Trump v. Hawaii (2018).

== Dissenting judgments or opinions ==
The arguments and reasoning of a dissenting judgment (the term used in the United Kingdom) also constitute obiter dicta. These, however, might also be cited should a court determine that its previous decision was in error, as when the United States Supreme Court cited Justice Oliver Wendell Holmes Jr.'s dissent in Hammer v. Dagenhart when it overturned Hammer in United States v. Darby Lumber Co.

In Shaw v DPP [1962] a publisher of the Ladies Directory (a guide to London prostitutes) was convicted of "conspiracy to corrupt public morals". He appealed on the grounds that no such offence existed. The House of Lords dismissed the appeal, in effect creating a new crime. Viscount Simonds said: "...there remains in the Courts of Law a residual power ... to conserve the moral welfare of the State, and ... guard it against attacks which may be the more insidious because they are novel and unprepared for." In a dissenting judgment, Lord Reid said: "Parliament is the proper place, ... to [create new criminal laws]. Where Parliament fears to tread it is not for the courts to rush in." Subsequently, Lord Reid was the leading judge in Knuller v. DPP, a case on obscene libel in which a publisher was charged with "conspiracy to corrupt public morals". In this case, Lord Reid said he still disagreed with the majority decision in Shaw, but in the interests of certainty he would not overturn Shaw.

== Semble ==
Akin to obiter is the concept of semble (Norman French for "it seems"), indicating that the point is uncertain or represents only the judge's opinion. For example, in Simpkins v Pays (1955), a grandmother, granddaughter and a lodger entered into weekly competitions in the Sunday Empire News. Each week, all three women together made a forecast and each contributed to the cost of entry; but it was the grandmother's name that was on the coupon. The grandmother received £750 in prize money and refused to share it with the other two. The lodger successfully sued for one third of the prize money; but Sellers J added semble that the granddaughter should also get £250, even though she had not been a party to the action.

== See also ==
- Dictum
- Footnote Four
