= Irish Language Commissioner =

The post of Irish language Commissioner (Irish: An Coimisinéir Gaeilge) is an office created by the Identity and Language (Northern Ireland) Act 2022 in Northern Ireland to promote and safeguard the respective language rights of Irish speakers in the country. The Northern Ireland Executive appoints the Irish Language Commissioner, as well as a Commissioner for the Ulster Scots and the Ulster British tradition.

The position has been seen by Loyalist politicians as controversial.

On 28 October 2025, Pól Deeds was appointed the first Irish language commissioner.

== See also ==
- An Coimisinéir Teanga, a similar position in the Republic of Ireland.
