= Plea in bar =

Defensive plea that lists special reasons why a trial cannot proceed

In common law systems, a plea in bar (known in the United States as a peremptory plea, also known as a special plea in bar, (Note: A general plea is "not guilty" or "guilty".) or a special plea) is a plea that sets out special reasons for which a trial cannot proceed. A successful plea in bar serves to end the case entirely. Pleas in bar may be used in civil or criminal cases; they address the substantial merits of the case.

== Criminal ==
In a criminal case, the usual peremptory pleas are the plea of autrefois convict, the plea of autrefois acquit, and the plea of pardon. The former two refer to cases of double jeopardy.

A plea of "autrefois convict" (Law French for "previously convicted") is one in which the defendant claims to have been previously convicted of the same offense and that he or she therefore cannot be tried for it again. In the instance where a defendant has been summoned to both criminal and civil proceedings, a plea of autrefois convict is essentially an application to "merge" proceedings, giving rise to res judicata or a cause of action estoppel in civil proceedings.

A plea of "autrefois acquit" is one in which the defendant claims to have been previously acquitted for the same offence and thus should not be tried again. The plea of autrefois acquit is a form of estoppel by which the state cannot reassert the guilt of the accused after they have been acquitted. The plea prevents inconsistent decisions and the reopening of litigation.

The limitations of these pleas have been circumscribed by various legal cases and appeals. In England, Wales and Northern Ireland, significant changes were made by the Criminal Justice Act 2003, by which an acquittal on a serious charge can be quashed and a retrial ordered, if there is "new and compelling evidence" against the acquitted person.

A statutory pardon does not have to be pleaded, but otherwise a pardon must be pleaded or else it may be taken to have been waived.

There is a fourth kind of special plea in bar in England and Wales, which can be pleaded by a parish or county which has been indicted for failing to repair a road or a bridge. (Note: The common law presumes that a parish is liable to repair a highway and a county is liable to repair a bridge, unless the contrary is shown.) The defendant must identify another person who is liable for the repair instead.

== Civil ==
In a civil case, a plea in bar alleges that circumstances exist that serve to block and defeat the plaintiff's case absolutely and entirely. Pleas in bar can include accord and satisfaction or the running of the statute of limitations. A special plea in bar advances new matter, while a general plea in bar denies some material allegation in the complaint.
