= Law of Northern Ireland =

The law of Northern Ireland is the legal system of statute and common law operating in Northern Ireland since the partition of Ireland established Northern Ireland as a distinct jurisdiction in 1921. Before 1921, Northern Ireland was part of the same British legal system as the rest of Ireland.

For the purposes of private international law, the United Kingdom is divided into three distinct legal jurisdictions: England and Wales; Northern Ireland and Scotland.

Northern Ireland is a common law jurisdiction. Although its common law is similar to that in England and Wales, and partially derives from the same sources, there are some important differences in law and procedure. Northern Irish law has its roots in Irish common law before the partition of Ireland in 1921 and the Acts of Union in 1801. Following the formation of the Irish Free State (which later became the Republic of Ireland), Northern Ireland became its own devolved legal jurisdiction within the United Kingdom.

== History of the law of Northern Ireland ==
The sources of Northern Irish law reflect Irish history and the various parliaments whose law affected the region.

=== The Brehon laws ===
The Brehon Laws were a relatively sophisticated early Irish legal system, the practice of which was only finally wiped out during the Cromwellian conquest of Ireland. The Brehon laws were a civil legal system only – there was no criminal law. Acts that would today be considered criminal were then dealt with in a similar manner to tort law today. A perpetrator would have to compensate the victim, rather than having a punishment, such as imprisonment, imposed upon him.

=== Common law ===
Ireland was the subject of the first extension of England's common law legal system outside England. While in England the creation of the common law was largely the result of the assimilation of existing customary law, in Ireland the common law was imported from England, gradually supplanting the customary law of the Irish.

== Legislation ==
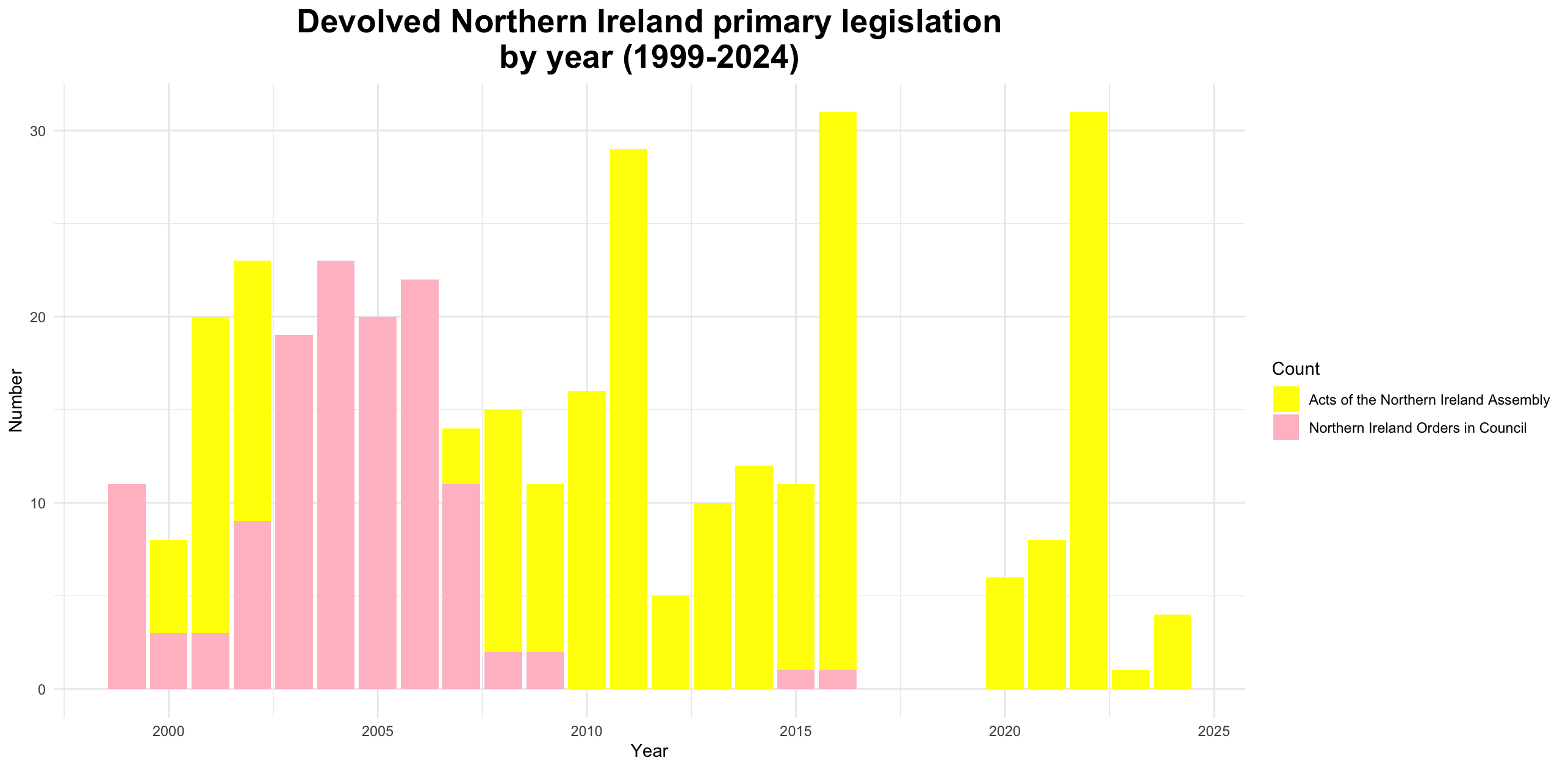
Bar graph showing the number of Northern Ireland primary legislation per year

The current statute law of Northern Ireland comprises those Acts of the Parliament of the United Kingdom that apply to Northern Ireland and Acts of the Northern Ireland Assembly, as well as statutory instruments made by departments of the Northern Ireland Executive and the UK Government, Acts of the Parliament of Northern Ireland passed between 1921 and 1972, Acts of the Parliament of Ireland made before the Act of Union 1800, and Acts of the Parliament of England, and of the Parliament of Great Britain, extended to Ireland under Poynings' Law between 1494 and 1782.

The Northern Ireland Parliament was prorogued in 1972; from then until the establishment of the Northern Ireland Assembly following the Good Friday Agreement, the primary method of making legislation for Northern Ireland was by means of orders in council under the Northern Ireland (Temporary Provisions) Act 1972. A number of important legislative measures were adopted using the order in council procedure: this included the Criminal Evidence (Northern Ireland) Order 1988 restricting the right to silence, the Fair Employment and Treatment Order (Northern Ireland) 1998 on religious and political discrimination.

=== Definition ===
The expression "Northern Ireland legislation" is defined by statute. The Northern Ireland Act 1998 establishes the legislative competence of the Northern Ireland Assembly. It creates a distinction between excepted matters, reserved matters and other matters (which are transferred i.e. they fall within the NI Assembly's competence).

Section 24(5) of the Interpretation Act 1978 now reads:

In this section "Northern Ireland legislation" means—

- (a) Acts of the Parliament of Ireland;
- (b) Acts of the Parliament of Northern Ireland;
- (c) Orders in Council under section 1(3) of the Northern Ireland (Temporary Provisions) Act 1972;
- (d) Measures of the Northern Ireland Assembly established under section 1 of the Northern Ireland Assembly Act 1973;
- (e) Orders in Council under Schedule 1 to the Northern Ireland Act 1974;
- (f) Acts of the Northern Ireland Assembly; and
- (g) Orders in Council under section 85 of the Northern Ireland Act 1998.

Paragraphs (d) to (g) were substituted by paragraph 3 of Schedule 13 to the Northern Ireland Act 1998.

Until 2 December 1999, paragraph 7(2) of Schedule 2 to the Northern Ireland Act 1982 provided that Orders in Council under section 38(1)(b) of the Northern Ireland Constitution Act 1973 were Northern Ireland legislation for the purposes of section 24 of the Interpretation Act 1978.

Section 5 of the Interpretation Act 1978 provides that in any Act, unless the contrary intention appears, the expression "Northern Ireland legislation" is to be construed according to Schedule 1 of that Act, which contains the following paragraph:

"Northern Ireland legislation" has the meaning assigned by section 24(5) of this Act. [1 January 1979]

The preceding paragraph applies, so far as applicable, to Acts passed on or after 1 January 1979.

=== Primary legislation ===
Primary Legislation is made by the legislative branch of government. In Northern Ireland this includes the Parliament of the United Kingdom (hereafter "Westminster") and the Northern Ireland Assembly ("the Assembly"). Legislation created by the Parliament of Northern Ireland, which operated from 1921 to 1972, is still in effect.

Westminster may still legislate on any Northern Ireland matter. In contrast the Assembly cannot legislate on "Excepted" matters nor "Reserved" matters. The Assembly may legislate on devolved ("Transferred") matters and then Westminster plays no part in the enactment of such legislation.

- Excepted matters remain the remit of Westminster and were those that were of imperial or national concern for example: the armed forces, external trade or weights & measures.
- Reserved matters were to be the remit of the proposed, but never operational, Council of Ireland, are now the remit of the Privy Council and may be transferred to the Assembly at a later date. Examples include the post office, criminal justice and administration of the courts.

Acts of the Northern Ireland Parliament are distinguished from Westminster Acts by the position of the phrase "Northern Ireland" inside their title.

Parliament	Act title
Northern Ireland (abolished)	The Subject Matter Act (Northern Ireland) 1958
United Kingdom	The Subject Matter (Northern Ireland) Act 1958

The Privy Council legislates on Reserved matters through Orders in Council. Technically speaking these are secondary, or delegated legislation, and they are therefore given UK Statutory Instrument numbers. Orders in Council are however used as primary legislation.

=== Secondary legislation ===
All secondary legislation is derived from primary legislation. Parliament cannot amend secondary legislation, but may reject or approve it. Secondary legislation is drafted by a branch of government:

- A parent Act can give power to a government department or agency to issue more detailed laws.
- The Privy Council of the United Kingdom can enact secondary legislation as "Orders in Council". The Privy Council of Northern Ireland was created in 1922, but became dormant in 1972 with the reinstatement of direct rule. Its advisory powers were then handed over to the Secretary of State for Northern Ireland, who is head of the Northern Ireland Office.

Secondary legislation is called a statutory instrument when drafted by a Westminster department and a statutory rule when drafted by an Assembly department. Previously statutory rules were titled "statutory rules and orders".

=== Summary table ===
Date	Matters	Primary	Secondary
1921 – present	Excepted	UK statute (Act)	Statutory instruments
1921 – present	Reserved	Orders in council (in effect)	Orders in council (technically)
1921–1973	Transferred	NI statute (Act)	Statutory rules and orders
2002 – 8 May 2007	Transferred	Orders in council (in effect)	Orders in council (technically)
1974 – present	Transferred	NI statute (order)	Statutory rules

== Legal publications ==
In 1979, there was a severe shortage of textbooks and of works of authority, such as annotated statutes, law reports and rules of court, because the potential readership of any legal work, no matter how general, was so small that publication was not commercially viable. The only periodical dealing with the law of Northern Ireland was the Northern Ireland Legal Quarterly (NILQ), a peer-reviewed quarterly journal published since 1936, published at the School of Law at Queen's University Belfast.

According to the Bodleian Library at Oxford University: "There are two main series of law reports for Northern Ireland: the Northern Ireland Law Reports (NI), which began in 1925; and the Northern Ireland Judgments Bulletin (NIJB), previously known as the Blue Books, which was first published in 1970".

The Northern Ireland Statutes Revised are printed editions of NI statutes, revised.

== Legal education ==
Both of Northern Ireland's universities offer a range of undergraduate and postgraduate law degrees:

- The School of Law at Queen's University of Belfast
- Ulster University School of Law

There are specialist research centres in the two universities:

- Human Rights Centre at Queen's University Belfast
- Institute for Criminology and Criminal Justice at Queen's University Belfast
- Transitional Justice Institute at Ulster University

Professional legal education is offered by the Institute of Professional Legal Studies at Queen's University Belfast and the Graduate School for Professional Legal Education at Ulster University.

== Criminal law ==
=== Criminal offences ===
==== Offences against the person ====
- Child destruction

==== Abortion ====
The 1967 Abortion Act does not apply in Northern Ireland. This situation led the Northern Ireland Human Rights Commission to take judicial proceedings which led to a decision in 2015 that Northern Ireland's abortion regime violated Article 8 of the European Convention on Human Rights as it failed to allow for termination in cases of fatal foetal abnormality or when pregnancy was due to a sexual offence.

Abortion was decriminalised in Northern Ireland when the relevant sections of the Offences against the Person Act 1861 were repealed in October 2019. The Abortion (Northern Ireland) Regulations 2020 commenced on 31 March 2020, authorising abortions to be carried out by a "registered medical professional".

==== Fatal offences ====
As to the mens rea for murder, see section 8 of the Criminal Justice Act (Northern Ireland) 1966.

The following partial defences reduce murder to manslaughter:

- loss of control
- diminished responsibility
- suicide pact

See also section 6 of the Criminal Justice Act (Northern Ireland) 1966. The common law defence of provocation was abolished and section 7 of that Act repealed by section 56 of the Coroners and Justice Act 2009.

The Infanticide Act (Northern Ireland) 1939 provides a partial defence which reduces murder to infanticide.

The penalty for murder is provided by section 1(1) of the Northern Ireland (Emergency Provisions) Act 1973.

==== Sexual offences ====
The Sexual Offences (Northern Ireland) Order 2008 reformed the law of sex crime in Northern Ireland similarly to how the Sexual Offences Act 2003 did in England and Wales.

==== Forgery, personation and cheating ====
- Forgery is covered by the Forgery and Counterfeiting Act 1981.
- The common law offence of cheating, except in relation to the public revenue, was abolished by section 30(1) of the Theft Act (Northern Ireland) 1969.

==== Offences against the State or Crown or Government and political offences ====
Several of these areas of law, such as treason, defence and foreign relations, are reserved or excepted matters, meaning only Westminster has the power to legislate for them.

- High treason
- Misprision of treason
- Compounding treason
- Treason felony
- Attempting to injure or alarm the Sovereign, contrary to section 2 of the Treason Act 1842
- Offences under the Official Secrets Acts 1911 to 1989
- Offences under the Incitement to Disaffection Act 1934
- Causing disaffection among police officers, contrary to section 68 of the Police (Northern Ireland) Act 1998
- Incitement to sedition or disaffection or promoting industrial unrest, contrary to section 3 of the Aliens Restriction (Amendment) Act 1919
- Offences relating to terrorism
- Offences under section 1 of the Unlawful Drilling Act 1819
- Piracy iure gentium
- Piracy with violence, contrary to the Piracy Act 1837
- Offences under the Slave Trade Act 1824
- Offences under the Foreign Enlistment Act 1870
- Offences under the Immigration Act 1971
- Coinage offences under Part II of the Forgery and Counterfeiting Act 1981
- Offences relating to public stores under the Public Stores Act 1875
- Offences against postal and electronic communication services
- Misconduct in public office
- Refusal to execute public office
- Cheating the public revenue
- Offences under the Customs and Excise Management Act 1979
- Tax evasion and money laundering offences

===== Abolished offences =====
- Sedition
- Seditious libel

==== Offences against religion and public worship ====
- Blasphemy
- Blasphemous libel

The Criminal Justice and Immigration Act 2008 abolished the offence of blasphemy in England and Wales; this measure did not extend to Northern Ireland.

==== Public order offences ====
- Prevention of Incitement to Hatred Act 1970 (Northern Ireland)
- Riot
- Affray
- Offences under the Public Order (Northern Ireland) Order 1987. These include Northern Ireland's incitement to hatred laws. In 2013 the Northern Ireland Human Rights Commission reported, in 'Racist Hate Crime: Human Rights and the Criminal Justice System in Northern Ireland', that authorities were uncertain about the scope of this legislation.
- Justice Act (NI) 2011 proscribes sectarian or indecent chanting at regulated matches.

==== Offences against public morals and public policy ====
- Bigamy

==== Participatory offences ====
Participatory offences include aiding, abetting, counselling, or procuring the act of some crime or conspiracy. It also includes being an accomplice to criminal behaviour.

=== Defences to crime ===
- Marital coercion

=== Criminal justice ===
Due to the history of political violence in Northern Ireland, there have been distinctive developments in Northern Irish criminal law and anti-terrorism procedures. These date to the Civil Authorities (Special Powers) Act (Northern Ireland) 1922, commonly called the Special Powers Act. Following the outbreak of violence in the 1960s and 1970s, the Northern Ireland (Emergency Provisions) Act 1973 introduced juryless Diplock courts to try terrorism related offences.

The Terrorism Act 2000 retains special provisions for Northern Ireland in respect of anti-terrorism law, and retains the possibility to try certain offences without a jury.

== Civil law ==
The Defamation Act 2013 does not apply in Northern Ireland. The protections which this Act provides for free expression (e.g. the public interest defence in section 4) do not therefore apply in Northern Ireland.

Northern Irish courts have issued a small number of super-injunctions.

=== Discrimination law ===
The Government of Ireland Act 1920 prohibited religious discrimination in legislation. In 1976 the UK Parliament passed the Fair Employment (Northern Ireland) Act which prohibited religious and political discrimination in employment. The Fair Employment (Northern Ireland) Act 1989 creates a system to monitor the religious composition of the workforce so as to promote fair participation.

In 1998 the Northern Ireland Act 1998 introduced a statutory duty on designated public authorities to promote equality of opportunity on a number of grounds.

While in some aspects Northern Ireland's equality law has been in advance of developments elsewhere, there are also examples where it is not as progressive. Racial discrimination in Northern Ireland was only prohibited in 1997. The Equality Act 2010 does not apply in Northern Ireland; this means that Northern Ireland's equality legislation is split across a large number of Acts and Orders.

== See also ==
- Northern Ireland Assembly (1973–1974) (legislative power in 1974 only)
- Northern Ireland Courts and Tribunals Service
- Attorney General for Northern Ireland
- Advocate General for Northern Ireland
- Public Prosecution Service for Northern Ireland
- Police Service of Northern Ireland
- List of statutory rules of Northern Ireland
- Law of Ireland prior to 1921
- Law of the United Kingdom
