= Belfast Guidelines on Amnesty and Accountability =

Soft-law codification project

Transitional Justice Institute
- Established: 2003
- Focus: Transitional Justice, Conflict, Human Rights Law, and International Law
- Website: www.ulster.ac.uk/transitionaljustice

The Belfast Guidelines is a project led by Professor Louise Mallinder and Prof Tom Hadden of the Transitional Justice Institute. The Guidelines examine the principles concerning the legality and legitimacy of amnesties in states transitioning from conflict or authoritarian regimes. They were drafted by an expert group that included Prof David Kretzmer and Prof William Schabas. They have been widely translated into Arabic, Chinese, Malay, Portuguese, Russian, Spanish and Thai.

== See also ==
- Ulster University School of Law
- Transitional Justice
- Transitional Justice Institute
- Amnesty law
