= Amnesty law =

Law that provides immunity for past crimes

An amnesty law is any legislative, constitutional or executive arrangement that retroactively gives amnesty and exempts a select group of people, usually military and government leaders, from criminal liability for the crimes that they committed.

== Support ==
Many countries have been plagued by revolutions, coups, and civil war. After such turmoil the leaders of the outgoing regime that want, or are forced, to restore democracy in their country are confronted with possible litigation regarding the "counterinsurgency" actions taken during their reign. It is not uncommon for people to make allegations of human rights abuse and crimes against humanity. To overcome the hazard of facing prosecution, many countries have absolved those involved of their alleged crimes.

Amnesty laws are often also equally problematic to the opposing side as a cost-benefit problem: Is bringing the old leadership to justice worth extending the conflict or rule of the previous regime, with an accompanying increase in suffering and casualties, as the old regime refuses to let go of power?

== Opposition ==
In the 'age of accountability', amnesty laws have come to be considered as granting impunity for the violation of human rights, including institutional measures that preclude the prosecution for such crimes and reprieve those crimes already convicted, avoiding any form of accountability.

Victims, their families and human rights organisations—e.g., Amnesty International, Human Rights Watch, Humanitarian Law Project—have opposed such laws through demonstrations and litigation, their argument being that an amnesty law violates local constitutional law and international law by upholding impunity.

Providing amnesty for "international crimes"—which include crimes against humanity, war crimes and genocide—is increasingly considered to be prohibited by international law. This understanding is drawn from the obligations set out in human rights treaties, the decisions of international and regional courts and the law emerging from long-standing state practice (customary international law). International, regional and national courts have increasingly overturned general amnesties. And recent peace agreements have largely avoided granting amnesty for serious crimes. With that in mind, the International Criminal Court was established to ensure that perpetrators do not evade command responsibility for their crimes should the local government fail to prosecute.

The Belfast Guidelines on Amnesty and Accountability set out a framework to evaluate the legality and legitimacy of amnesties in accordance with the multiple legal obligations faced by states undergoing conflict or political transition. They have been collectively authored by a group of international human rights and conflict resolution experts led by Louise Mallinder and Tom Hadden at the Transitional Justice Institute.

== Countries ==
=== Afghanistan ===
Afghanistan has adopted a law precluding prosecution for war crimes committed in conflicts in previous decades.

The Afghan government adopted the Action Plan for Peace, Justice, and Reconciliation in December 2005, and hotly debated the plan's focus on criminal accountability. Later, Parliament adopted a bill that provided a nearly blanket amnesty for all those involved in the Afghan conflict.

The drafting of the amnesty bill was pioneered by some of the former commanders known to have committed human rights abuses and who felt threatened by the sudden emphasis on accountability. Although this bill was never formally recognized as law, it has had major political significance, serving as a clear signal of some human rights violators’ continuing power.

=== Algeria ===
A decree by the President in 2006 makes prosecution impossible for human rights abuses, and even muzzle open debate by criminalizing public discussion about the nation's decade-long conflict.

=== Argentina ===
The National Commission for Forced Disappearances (CONADEP), led by writer Ernesto Sabato, was created in 1983. Two years later, the Juicio a las Juntas (Trial of the Juntas) largely succeeded in proving the crimes of the various juntas which had formed the self-styled National Reorganization Process. Most of the top officers who were tried were sentenced to life imprisonment: Jorge Rafael Videla, Emilio Eduardo Massera, Roberto Eduardo Viola, Armando Lambruschini, Raúl Agosti, Rubén Graffigna, Leopoldo Galtieri, Jorge Anaya and Basilio Lami Dozo. However, Raúl Alfonsín's government voted two amnesty laws to avoid the escalation of trials against militaries involved in human rights abuses: the 1986 Ley de Punto Final and the 1987 Ley de Obediencia Debida. President Carlos Menem then pardoned the leaders of the junta and the surviving commanders of the armed leftist guerrilla organizations in 1989–1990. Following persistent activism by the Mothers of the Plaza de Mayo and other associations, the amnesty laws were overturned by the Argentine Supreme Court nearly twenty years later, in June 2005. However, the ruling wasn't applied to the guerrilla leaders, who remained at large.

=== Benin ===
In the 1980s, incompetent economic management and ballooning domestic graft, including the draining of funds from parastatals, combined with a continent-wide economic crisis, effectively bankrupted the economy. The government turned to the Bretton Woods institutions for support, which required the implementation of unpopular economic austerity measures. In 1988, when France refused to meet the budgetary shortfall, the three main banks, all state-owned, collapsed and the government was unable to pay teachers, civil servants and soldiers their salaries, nor students their grants. This caused domestic opposition to mushroom, rendering the country ‘virtually ungovernable’.20 The World Bank and the InternationalMonetary Fund (IMF) refused to provide emergency assistance because of Benin's failure to adhere to prior agreements.21 Kérékou convened a national conference to discuss the country's future course, bringing together representatives of all sectors of Beninese society, including ‘teachers, students, the military, government officials, religious authorities, non-governmental organizations, more than 50 political parties, ex-presidents, labor unions, business interests, farmers, and dozens of local development organizations’.22 Kérékou believed that he could retain control of the 488 delegates. Instead, when it met in February 1990, the convention declared itself sovereign, redefined the powers of the presidency, reducing Kérékou to a figurehead role, and appointed Nicéphore Soglo, a former World Bank staff member, to act as executive prime minister. In exchange for a full pardon for any crimes he may have committed, Kérékou peacefully ceded power. By March 1991, the Beninese electorate had ratified a new constitution and democratically elected Soglo president.

=== Brazil ===
In 1979, Brazil's military dictatorship—which suppressed young political activists and trade unionists—passed an amnesty law. This law allowed exiled activists to return, but was also used to shield human rights violators from prosecution. Perpetrators of human rights abuses during Brazil's 1964 to 1985 military dictatorship were never criminally prosecuted or tried.

In December 2010, the Inter-American Court of Human Rights condemned Brazil for failing to investigate and convict those guilty of "arbitrary detention, torture and forced disappearance of 70 people, including members of the Communist Party of Brazil and peasants in the region" of Araguaia River basin, "as result of Brazilian army operations carried out between 1972 and 1975”, during the Araguaia Guerrilla War. However, on April 29, 2010, the Brazilian Supreme Federal Court rejected a lawsuit brought by the Order of Attorneys of Brazil questioning the validity of the Amnesty Law and ruled, by 7 votes to 2, that the Amnesty Law covers those accused of torture, murder, forced disappearance and sexual abuse committed by the military and other public agents during the regime. At the time, Justice Marco Aurélio said that the Inter-American Court's decision was only politically effective, but "has no concreteness as a judicial title." According to him, the practical effect of the conviction by the Inter-American Court is nothing but "a signal".

In July 2018, the Inter-American Court of Human Rights again condemned Brazil for the "lack of investigation, trial and punishment of those responsible" for the arrest, torture and death of journalist Vladimir Herzog", which took place in 1975. The Inter-American Court's ruling determined that the torture and death of Herzog was a crime against humanity, and therefore not subject to limitations or amnesty.

=== Chile ===
When Augusto Pinochet was arrested in London as part of a failed extradition to Spain, which was demanded by magistrate Baltasar Garzón, more information concerning Condor was revealed. One of the lawyers who asked for his extradition talked about an attempt to assassinate Carlos Altamirano, leader of the Chilean Socialist Party. Pinochet would have met Italian terrorist Stefano Delle Chiaie in Madrid in 1975, during Franco's funeral, to have him murdered. But as with Bernardo Leighton, who was shot in Rome in 1975 after a meeting the same year in Madrid between Stefano Delle Chiaie, Michael Townley and anti-Castrist Virgilio Paz Romero, the plan ultimately failed.

Chilean judge Juan Guzmán Tapia would eventually make jurisprudence concerning "permanent kidnapping." since the bodies of the victims could not be found, he deemed that the kidnapping may be said to continue, therefore refusing to grant to the military the benefices of the statute of limitation. This helped indict Chilean militaries who were benefitting from a 1978 self-amnesty decree.

=== Democratic Republic of the Congo ===
In November 2005 an amnesty law was adopted regarding offences committed between August 1996 and June 2003.

President Joseph Kabila put an Amnesty Law into effect in May 2009. This law forgives combatants for war-related violence in the eastern provinces of North and South Kivu committed between June 2003 and May 2009 – excluding genocide, war crimes international crimes against humanity. Although of limited temporal and geographic scope, by granting amnesty for many crimes perpetuated by rebel groups, Congolese armed forces, militias, and police, there is a risk that the law may perpetuate the DRC's culture of impunity.

=== El Salvador ===
Following the twelve-year-long civil war an amnesty law was passed in 1993. The law modified a previous amnesty law which was passed in 1992. In 2016, however, the amnesty law was overturned by the El Salvador Supreme Court.

=== England ===
The Indemnity and Oblivion Act was passed in 1660, as part of rebuilding during the English Restoration after the English Civil War. It was jokingly referred to as producing "indemnity for the King's enemies and oblivion for the King's friends".

The so-called "Alan Turing law" is an amnesty law for men convicted of consensual homosexual sex prior to the passing of the Sexual Offences Act 1967. The Government has announced that the amnesty will be introduced in England and Wales as an amendment to the Policing and Crime Bill 2016.

=== Italy ===
In the Republic of Italy, since a constitutional amendment in 1992, amnesty and commutation (indulto) require a two-thirds majority in Parliament (art. 79), while the President retains the power to pardon individuals. Between 1942 and 1990, there were 34 acts of clemency, the Togliatti amnesty being the most famous. Afterwards, there was only an indulto in 2006 under the Second Prodi government, which freed 25 thousand people from prison and reduced the crime rate because the beneficiaries had a lower recidivism.

=== Lebanon ===
Throughout the Lebanese history, several occasions of amnesty can be detected that precluded prosecution for war crimes committed in conflicts in previous decades. In the context of Lebanon, amnesty has been considered to be a "politics of protracted conflict," affecting the anticipation of future violence and influencing the sectarian reality in the country.

An official amnesty law in Lebanon has only been adopted in 1991, following the civil war that lasted between 1975 and 1990. Other instances of amnesty were enacted following earlier conflicts in the region. In 1839 amnesty was granted by Ibrahim Pasha to the Druze population who had committed crimes against the Maronite population of Mount Lebanon. In 1845 amnesty was granted by Ottoman foreign minister Sakib Efendi to the Druze and Christian communal leaders, following communal tensions in the 'Double Kaymakamate'. In 1860, a third amnesty materialized following the popular revolt led by Tanyus Shahin. In 1958, following a crisis in Lebanon, a politics of 'No Victor, No Vanquished' was first invoked by Saeb Salam.

==== 1839: Druze-Christian tensions in Mount Lebanon ====
A year before, in 1838, fighting erupted between Druze and Christian Ottomans, following the reforms of Ibrahim Pasha of Egypt in Syria. The insurgents were granted amnesty to restore civil peace in the region.

Under the rule of Pasha, who was the son of Muhammad Ali of Egypt, power in the region was altered from Istanbul to Cairo and the Druze were conscripted to fight along his side. However, the request of Druze arms was highly unpopular among the Druze population, as were following conscription orders, resulting in a major insurrection of the Druze population of Wadi al-Taym and Mount Lebanon against the authority of Pasha. This revolt, commonly known as the 1838 Druze revolt, was suppressed by Pasha with the collaboration of Bashir Shihab II, the Lebanese emir by that time, and Maronite villagers. Pasha succeeded to put down the rebellion, and the total submission of the Druze leaders and population was accepted.

Although several authors have interpreted the Egyptian policy of arming Christian villagers to suppress the Druzes as a turning point in Druze-Maronite relationships, others have argued that the antagonism between Druzes and Maronites can be explained more in terms of loyalty, as the insurrection of the Druzes was justified in terms of their loyalty to the Sultan, and the armed Christian villagers were obedient to Ibrahim Pasha.

Given the successive defeats of the Druze, their chiefs were convinced that an agreement was to be reached with Ibrahim Pasha to end the revolt. In this agreement, the Druze insurgents were granted aman, referring to the notion of clemency or amnesty granted by a ruler, and exempted from conscription in return for their disarmament. In a letter, Pasha wrote to Bashir Shihab:

"Emir. As regards the Druzes if Jabal al-Shuf, let bygones be bygones. Do not harm them when they return to their homes. Allay their fears and set their minds at rest."

In this peace agreement, Pasha agreed to give amnesty to the insurgents and the past crimes of the Druze population were forgotten according to the principle of 'let bygones be bygones'. Doing so, Pasha intended to restore civil peace in Mount Lebanon and "abolish the memory of past deeds and transgressions." However, the decision to abolish this memory of past crimes could not undo the history of inter-communal conflict with sectarian underpinnings. Despite the attempts of Pasha's amnesty to restore the social order between the Druze and Christian communities, and erase the Druze-Christian dichotomy to return to previous loyalties that were based on Ottoman authority, social order was yet again destabilized in the 1840s when Mount Lebanon became a battlefield between Europeans, Ottomans, and local communities over the future of the Ottoman Empire.

==== 1845: Communal tensions in the Kaymakamate ====
A second amnesty in the context of Lebanon, which similarly attempted to restore the social order and regenerate loyalty to the ruling powers, was adopted in 1845 by Ottoman foreign minister Sakib Efendi.

Bitter conflicts between the Christian and Druze communities had been simmering under Ibrahim Pasha's rule, and following other incidents of communal violence the sultan deposed Bashir III on 13 January 1842 and replaced him with Omar Pasha as the new governor of Mount Lebanon. This appointment, nevertheless, did generate more problems than it clarified. European ambassadors and Ottoman foreign ministry officials and military commanders met in 1842, to discuss the issue of communal violence. The Austrian Chancellor Klemens von Metternich proposed the administrative partition of Lebanon into Christian and Druze districts. This proposal, known as the 'Double Kaymakamate', was adopted on 7 December 1842, creating a 'Christian' Northern district under the rule of a Christian Kaymakam and a 'Druze' southern district ruled by a Druze district governor.

Communal tension between the Druze and Christian communities continued, when the Ottoman foreign minister Sakib Efendi, under the pressure of the European powers, arrived in Lebanon to arrange a settlement between the communal leaders. The system of the double Kaymakamate was to remain in place, but Mount Lebanon was to be pacified in terms of communal relations. "The old-regime social order" had to be maintained. Sakib Efendi tried to reimpose absolute Ottoman sovereignty in the region, promoting an official Ottoman nationalism to contain sectarian mobilizations. His vision of this new sectarian order came to be known as the Règlement, which based itself on the idea of an ancient rivalry between the Christians and Druzes. Efendi reconfirmed the Kaymakams, however, created for each district an administrative council that included a judge and an advisor for each of the communities, being it Maronite, Druze, Sunni, Greet Orthodox, or Greek Catholic.

With regard to amnesty, the notables of each of these sects were reconfirmed in their function to maintain law and order. With this restoration, the elites were "rehabilitated in the eyes of the state." Efendi forced the communal notables to sign and accept a peace treaty that was based upon the same principle as the amnesty of 1839: 'let bygones be bygones'. The past of transgression was abolished and the status quo of the political sectarian harmony under the benign Ottoman rule became underscored. Yet again, the leaders of the sects were protected in their position, and the local inhabitants of Mount Lebanon had to subject themselves to the rule of the communal and Ottoman notables. Peace was imposed in the region due to the amnesty law adopted in 1845, however, the source of the sectarian clashes was not resolved and distrust among sects increased.

==== 1860: Mount Lebanon civil war ====
Following the general rebellion led by Tanyus Shahin, which led to the overthrow of the notably Khazin family in Keserwan District, a third amnesty materialized in 1860 under the leadership of Ottoman governor Hurshid Pasha.

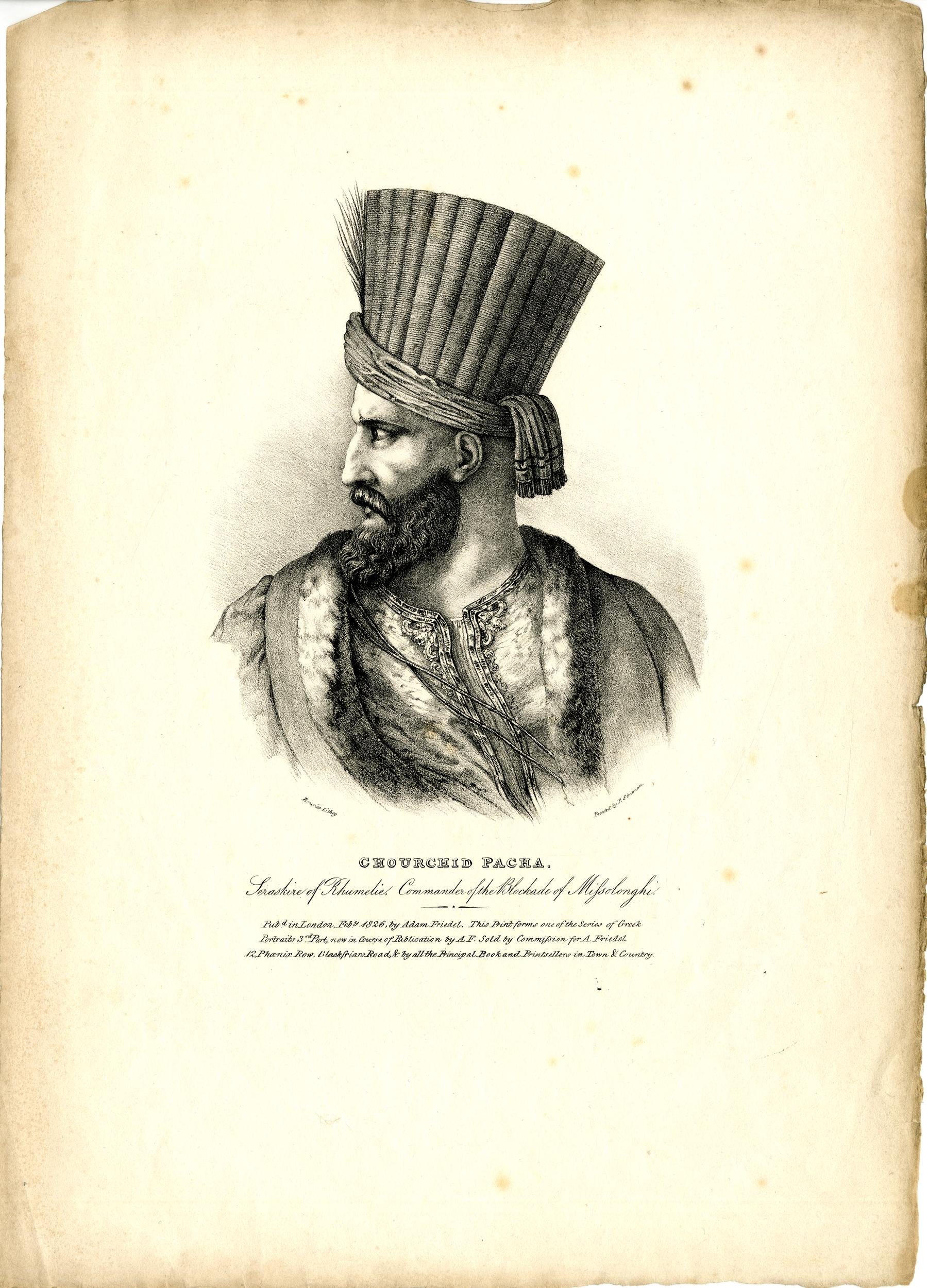
Portrait of Hurshid Pasha

Tensions continued within the double Kamaykamate system, expressing themselves both in class (Maronites against Maronites) and sectarian (Maronites against Druzes) clashes, which ultimately culminated in the massacre of 1860 in Damascus. The sectarian tensions in this period originated partly in the chaos of the restoration period, and clarified more drastically following the popular revolt led by Tanyus Shahin, which started in the north of Mount Lebanon in 1858 as a rebellion of Maronite peasants against their, mostly Druze, overlords, the heavy taxes imposed upon them, and the feudal practices prevailing in the region. During this rebellion, Shahin managed to convince a part of the Maronite population that the Druze were "unbelievers" and were treating the Christians unjustly. Stating so, Shahin created a sectarian discourse that shifted "the basis of loyalty away from a notable family toward an imagined political sectarian community," a unified Christian sect. Following these events, the rebellion spread to the south of the country where the Druze population increasingly turned against the Maronite Christians, resulting in heavy losses on both sides.

When the last major Christian centers in the sectarian landscape were contested, and the Druzes appeared victorious in destroying Shahin's dream of a unified Christian sect, the local Ottoman government of Hurshid Pasha adopted a peace treaty in July between Druze and Christian notables. The purpose of this treaty was to restore social order and the elite political life of the communal leaders. The treaty reinstated an imperial Ottoman authority over the population of Mount Lebanon and underscored the illegitimacy of previous popular revolts, reinforcing "a strict sectarian hierarchy."

Although with some resistance on the side of the Maronite leaders, peace was agreed upon by the Druze and Christian notables by 12 July 1860. The ahali, the common Druze and Christian villagers that constituted the mass of indigenous society, yet again found themselves back in the position of the obedient followers of the Ottoman Sultan's will.

"Each person was to return to his place ... and to take back all his property and lands as it was in the past."

Hurshid did grant amnesty to the notables of both the Druze and Christian kaymakams, however, reprimanded them for their failure to prevent the inter-communal violence of the civil war. Following the principle of 'let bygones be bygones', this third amnesty intended to protect the social order, restore the political life of the communal notables, the elite, and make everyone forget the past violations. Nevertheless, rather than forgetting, "memory intensified" and "the structures of a culture of sectarianism were deeply forming."

==== 1958: Lebanon crisis ====
An amnesty politics of "No Victor, No Vanquished" was first invoked by former prime minister Saeb Salam following the 1958 civil war.

The 1958 Lebanon crisis was a Lebanese political crisis caused both by political and religious tensions within the country, and by tensions between forces in favor of and against the pro-Western Baghdad Pact. During the crisis, Lebanon was facing inter-communal tensions between the Maronite and the Muslim population of the country. At the same time, tensions were escalating between Lebanon and the United Arab Republic, consisting of Egypt and Syria, who feared that Lebanon posed a threat to the Arab nationalism of Gamal Abdel Nasser. Within Lebanon, Muslims pushed the government of President Camille Chamoun to join the newly created United Arab Republic, however, Lebanese Christians preferred the country's alliance with the Western powers. In June 1958, groups backed by Nasser, supported by a considerable amount of the Lebanese Muslim population, attempted to overthrow Chamoun's government. Appealing to the United States for help under the new Eisenhower Doctrine, Chamoun was backed by American forces that intervened in Lebanon. The crisis ended with an agreement, which allowed Chamoun to end his term after which Fuad Chehab would succeed him. The prime minister by that time, Saeb Salam, declared the end of the violence with the phrase "No Victor, No Vanquished," which made him a communal hero in that period.

The politics of 'No Victor, No Vanquished', as invoked by former prime minister Saeb Salam, implied that no political party or sect in the country could eliminate any of the other parties or sects. All of the political groupings were to be represented in the political system to ensure coexistence and national unity in Lebanon, and preserve a nation that was tolerant of diverse religions and communities. Whereas the intention of amnesty politics in previous occasions centered around the idea of restoring order for the elite class, this was different in the case of the amnesty adopted in 1958. Rather, the amnesty politics of 1958 came with a preservation of the 1943 National Pact, which preserved a Political sectarianism that centered around the protection of an equal share between Muslims and Christians in the Lebanese government.

==== 1991: Post-Lebanese Civil War ====
Following the supposed end of the Lebanese Civil War, the Lebanese government adopted a general amnesty law on 26 August 1991.

Between 1975 and 1990, Lebanon experienced a brutal civil war in which a range of domestic and international actors were involved. The war did not formally end with a peace agreement, but a regionally established Taif Agreement reached a compromise between the actors involved in 1989. This agreement intended to tackle national reconciliation and promote administrative reforms in the country, however, a topic that was not addressed was the war and its repercussions. According to official data, a 144,240 people died throughout the war, a 197,506 were wounded, and 17,415 people disappeared. Nevertheless, these violations have not been addressed formally, nor have prosecutions been conducted for such crimes. This lack of accountability for past war crimes can be ascribed to the comprehensive amnesty law that was passed in 1991.

===== Law 84/91 =====
Following the end of the civil war in Lebanon, the Lebanese Parliament decided on 28 March 1991 to disarm and demobilize all militias, and reintegrate these militias into the regular forces. Heavy weaponry, headquarters and barracks were supposed to be handed over to the Lebanese or Syrian army officials prior to the deadline of 30 April. In reality, however, post-war militias "sold armaments abroad, hid heavy weapons in remote mountainous areas, kept light and medium weapons to hand and continued to train potential fighters." Exemptions to this decision of dissolvement included Palestinian militias and Hezbollah, which both continued as a force of resistance against the ongoing occupation of Israel. A militia that rejected the proposal for its reintegration into the regular forces was the Israeli proxy, the South Lebanon Army. This militia's continued collaboration with Israel prevented it from benefiting from the amnesty law.

After the governmental decision of disarmament, a general amnesty law (law 84/91) was adopted on 28 August 1991 by the Lebanese Parliament, which included several former militia officials who had been appointed to fill vacant seats. The amnesty law, reminiscent of the blanket amnesty that was adopted in the wake of the civil war in 1958, applied to all political and wartime crimes, including crimes against humanity and human dignity, conducted prior to the date of 28 March 1991. Exempted from the law only were crimes committed against political and religious leaders. Covering abduction and hostage-taking, the law pardoned offenses that are usually punishable under Article 569 of the Lebanese Penal Code, which prescribes life imprisonment for such crimes.

By adopting an amnesty law that "sought to present Lebanon as a national community" that was "able to maneuver past ideological disagreements and even armed conflict," the political elite promoted a politics of 'No Victor, No Vanquished,' similar to the politics of amnesty of 1958. Doing so, the political elite reconciled with each other over mutual interests and armed opponents were encouraged to set aside their differences to share political power.

===== Aftermath =====
Hitherto, passed amnesty law of 1991 has had consequences permeating socio-political life in Lebanon.

The passing of the amnesty law has allowed the continuation of political careers for those who had committed crimes throughout the Lebanese civil war. Today, leaders of some of the militias that were responsible for abductions throughout the Lebanese Civil War are still serving as government ministers.

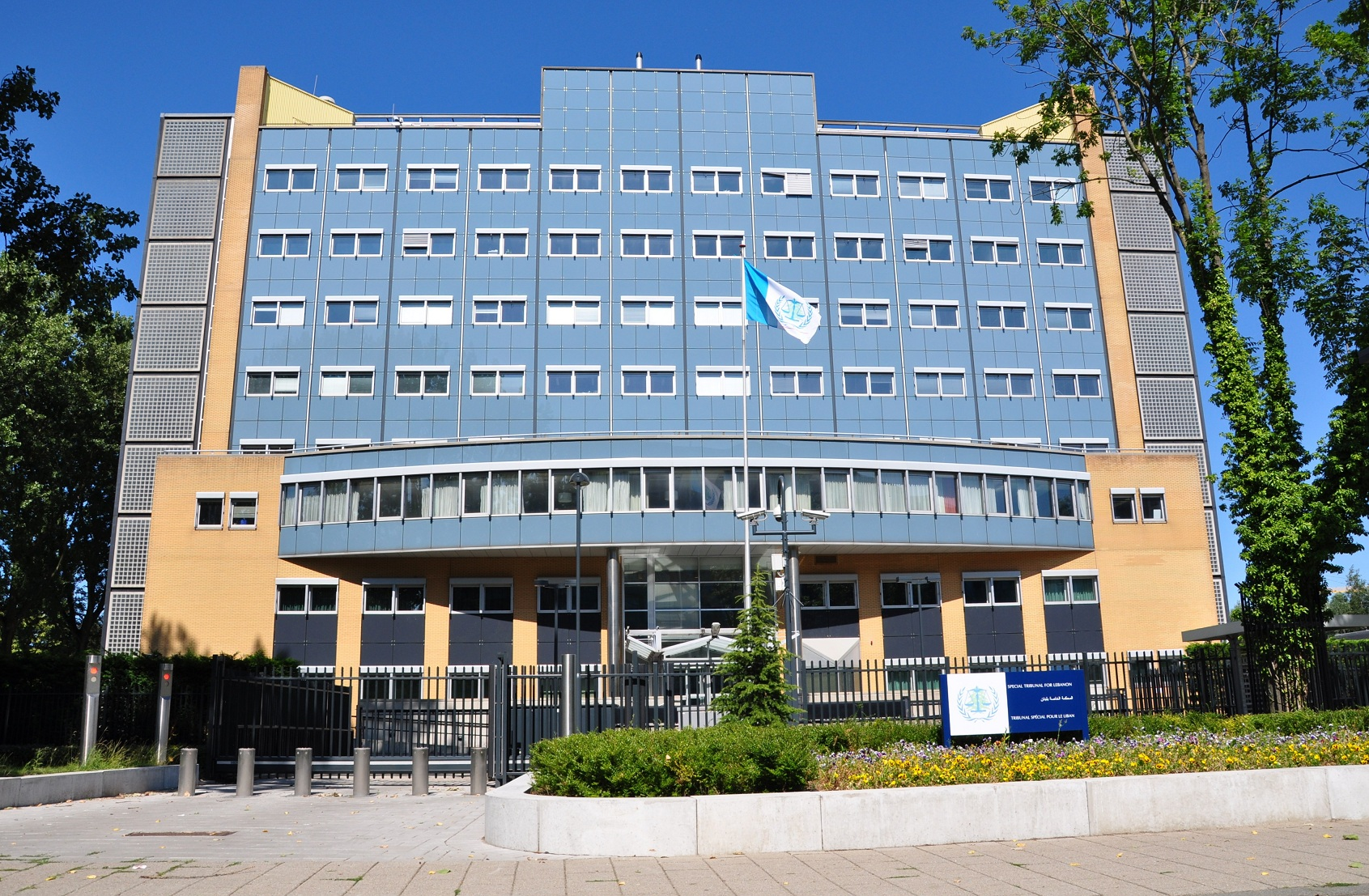
The UN Special Tribunal for Lebanon in Leidschendam, The Netherlands.

As the law intended to "eliminate a history of social and political disorder and create the appearance that nobody was wrong and nobody had to be held full accountable," victims of the civil war in Lebanon have not been compensated, and perpetrators have not been held accountable for crimes committed throughout the civil war. As several authors have pointed out, little public discussion of the past is present in contemporary Lebanon:

"There is no plan for broader war crimes or human rights trials, and there are no policies in place for transitional justice mechanisms or a national reconciliation process. There is relatively little public discussion of the past, and certainly no shared narrative regarding the conflict, although the latter is often difficult if not impossible."

To date, there has been little transitional justice for crimes committed during and following the civil war, which has contributed to "a culture of impunity" in Lebanon, characterized by the absence of any serious accountability process for past violations, a lack of opportunities to address the abuses conducted during the conflict, and a selective approach to criminal justice. The only current measure in place for accountability is the internationalized UN Special Tribunal for Lebanon to carry out the investigation and prosecution of those responsible for the assassination of Lebanon's former Prime Minister Rafic Hariri on 14 February 2005 alongside several related assassinations. Nevertheless, this tribunal was not designed to address any of the events during the civil war and many have, therefore, criticized the tribunal for being "politicised and unable to deliver accountability."

Another severe consequence of the amnesty law of 1991 has been the strengthening of communitarian frameworks in Lebanese society. Due to the amnesty law, all Lebanese citizens were absolved from any responsibility for possible past actions during war time. With the law in place, the political elites of Lebanon did undermine the individual accountability of citizens "on which rests a democratic and secular state." Subsequently, memory and reconciliation with regard to the past war continues to take place within a communitarian framework, reinforcing the role of the zu'amā, the politico-religious leaders.

===== International criticism =====
The amnesty law of 1991 has been received with plenty of academic and international critique, particularly from a human rights perspective.

A general criticism to the amnesty law has been concerned with the preservation of leadership by the political elite. In his review of the trial of the assassination attempt against Michel Murr, Lebanese lawyer Nizar Saghieh observes the consecration of the Lebanese leaders, stating that "while the United Nations consecrated the Universal Declaration for Human Rights as a lesson learned in the wake of the Second World War, it seemed that the lesson the Lebanese people learned at the end of their war was the necessity to protect and revere their leaders."

Official institutions have similarly criticized the 1991 Lebanese amnesty law. For example, following a report by the Lebanese Government on its implementation of the International Covenant on Civil and Political Rights, the Human Rights Committee stated that:

“The Committee notes with concern the amnesty granted to civilian and military personnel for human rights violations they may have committed against civilians during the civil war. Such a sweeping amnesty may prevent the appropriate investigation and punishment of the perpetrators of past human rights violations, undermine efforts to establish respect for human rights, and constitute an impediment to efforts undertaken to consolidate democracy.”

The amnesty law of 1991 has also been criticized by human-rights organization Amnesty International, arguing that critical and impartial investigations should be conducted into the allegations of human rights violations to "determine individual and collective responsibility and to provide a full account of truth to the victim, their relatives and society."

=== Peru ===
On 14 June 1995, President Alberto Fujimori signed a bill granting amnesty for any human rights abuses or other criminal acts committed from May 1982 to 14 June 1995 as part of the counterinsurgency war by military, police, and civilians.

The amnesty laws created a new challenge for the human rights movement in Peru. They thwarted the demands for truth and justice that thousands of family members of victims of political violence have been making since the 1980s. Thus, after the fall of Alberto Fujimori in 2001, the Inter-American Court ruled that the amnesty laws 26.479 and 26.492 were invalid because they were incompatible with the American Convention on Human Rights. The court later specified that the ruling was applicable to all Peruvian cases.

=== Senegal ===
A bill absolved anyone convicted for committing political crimes. Among them those who were convicted of having assassinated a constitutional court judge in 1993.

=== Sierra Leone ===
On 7 July 1999, the "Lomé Peace Agreement" was signed. Along with a cease-fire agreement between the government of Alhaji Ahmad Tejan Kabbah and the Revolutionary United Front (RUF) it contained proposals to "expunge responsibility for all offences including international crimes, otherwise known as delict jus gentium such as crimes against humanity, war crimes, genocide, torture and other serious violations of international humanitarian law."

=== South Africa ===
Following the end of apartheid South Africa decided not to prosecute but instead created the Truth and Reconciliation Commission (TRC). Its aim was to investigate and elucidate the crimes committed during the apartheid regime while not indicting in an attempt to make the alleged perpetrators more compliant to cooperate.

The TRC offered of "amnesty for truth" to perpetrators of human rights abuses during the apartheid era. This enabled abusers to confess their actions to the TRC to be granted amnesty. It aroused much controversy in the country and internationally.

=== Spain ===
In 1977, the first democratic government elected after Franco's death passed the Law 46/1977, of 15 October, of amnesty, which exempted of responsibility to everyone who committed any offence for political reasons prior to this date. This law allowed the commutation of sentences of those accused to attack the dictatorship and secured that those crimes committed during the Francoism would not be prosecuted.

In 2024, the Congress of Deputies passed the Organic Law 1/2024, of 10 June, of amnesty for the institutional, political, and social normalization in Catalonia, a requirement for the 2023 investiture of Pedro Sánchez, which aimed at pardoning all those sentenced or prosecuted between 2011 and 2023 for the 2014 Catalan self-determination referendum, the 2017 Catalan independence referendum and Catalan declaration of independence and its subsequent demonstrations and protests.

=== Thailand ===
In May 1992 popular protests in Bangkok broke out against the government of Suchinda Kraprayoon. The Royal Thai Army and Royal Thai Police fired rifles and pistols directly at protesters, which killed more than 50 people. On 23 May, King Bhumibol signed Suchinda's amnesty decree that applied to both side of the conflicts. Suchinda was not charged any wrongdoing for commanding excessive force against peaceful protesters.

=== Turkey ===
In Turkey construction amnesties have led to criticism after the earthquake of February 2023.

=== United States ===
During the war on terror, the United States enacted the Military Commissions Act of 2006 in an attempt to regulate the legal procedures involving illegal combatants. Part of the act was an amendment which retroactively rewrote the War Crimes Act effectively making policy makers (i.e., politicians and military leaders) and those applying policy (i.e., CIA interrogators and U.S. soldiers) no longer subject to legal prosecution under U.S. law for acts defined as war crimes before the amendment was passed. Because of that, critics describe the MCA as an amnesty law for crimes committed in the war on terror.

=== Uruguay ===
Uruguay granted the former military regime amnesty for the violations of human rights during their regime.

== See also ==
- Command responsibility
- Crime against humanity
- Criminal law
- International humanitarian law
- International law
- Pardon
- Transitional justice
- Transitional Justice Institute
- Universal jurisdiction
- War crimes
