= Christy Walsh case =

Criminal case in Northern Ireland

- Court: Diplock court
- Decided: 1991

Case history
- Appealed from: Court of Appeal
- Appealed to: Criminal Cases Review Commission
- Subsequent action: Miscarriage of justice

Court membership
- Judge sitting: John. W. McIlhenney

John Christopher "Christy" Walsh, from West Belfast, was convicted in 1991 by a Diplock Court of possessing explosives in connection with the conflict in Northern Ireland, and campaigned for 20 years to clear his name on the basis that his conviction was a miscarriage of justice. His case was referred to the Court of Appeal by the Criminal Cases Review Commission in 2000. When that appeal failed, he appealed again. In January 2002, his conviction was upheld even though the court acknowledged the possibility that procedural irregularities might have amounted to an interference with his right to a fair trial.

Following an unprecedented third appeal on the basis of new evidence, his conviction was overturned as unsafe on 16 March 2010. Walsh has been refused compensation for the conviction and his time spent in prison and is engaged in a campaign to reverse that decision and to draw attention to the alleged failings of the Northern Ireland Human Rights Commission.

In October 2012, Walsh made an application for a writ of coram nobis. His Honour Mr Justice Weatherup observed, "The Court of Appeal concluded that there was no ground on which a court of first instance could reopen its own decision other than for fraud. ... Any impropriety by Counsel for the Department will be dealt with by the complaints and discipline procedures applicable to members of the Bar."
