= Stormont House Agreement =

2014 agreement for the governance of Northern Ireland

The Stormont House Agreement is a political accommodation between the British and Irish governments, and a majority of parties that make up the Northern Ireland Executive. The agreement was published on 23 December 2014. The Stormont House Agreement is intended to bind the parties and communities closer together on resolving identity issues, coming to a settlement on welfare reform, and on making government finance in Northern Ireland more sustainable. After ten weeks of further talks, it led to the Fresh Start Agreement in November 2015, which aimed to secure the full implementation of the Stormont House Agreement and to deal with the impact of continued paramilitary activity.

The agreement was named after the building where the negotiations took place; Stormont House, the provincial headquarters of the Northern Ireland Office. The talks were primarily chaired by the Secretary of State for Northern Ireland Theresa Villiers, though Irish Minister for Foreign Affairs Charles Flanagan, British Prime Minister David Cameron and Irish Taoiseach Enda Kenny also participated at various points.

The agreement came after approximately thirty hours of continuous, final-stage talks. Prior to the agreement, there had been an increasing feeling that the Northern Ireland Executive and Assembly were in danger of collapse.

== Background ==
In the aftermath of the Good Friday and St Andrews agreements which brought and restored devolution to Northern Ireland, several issues remained unresolved by the political parties. Issues relating to the legacy of The Troubles, including victims’ rights and investigation of historic criminal activity, had not been the subject of compromise between the Unionist and Nationalist communities. Ongoing division also surrounded issues of identity, including Orange Order parades and the flying of flags (which had manifested itself in the Belfast City Hall flag protests from 2012 to 2013).

Some of these sources of disagreement were addressed during talks brokered by Richard Haass and Professor Meghan O'Sullivan. These talks began in September 2013, and broke up on 31 December of that year without agreement.

Several other ongoing political contentions were also resolved by the Stormont House Agreement. These include the devolution of Corporation Tax to Northern Ireland. Within Northern Ireland there has been an all-party consensus on the need to devolve corporation tax to allow the Province to compete for business with the Republic of Ireland. This is because the Republic of Ireland's rate of tax is 12.5%, considerably lower than the UK rate of 20%, which Northern Ireland businesses currently pay.

Welfare reform was also the subject of extensive disagreement between elements of the Executive (notably Sinn Féin), and the UK Government. HM Treasury had been determined that Northern Ireland should adopt the welfare reform, and had imposed fines on the Executive for their failure to do so. Within the Executive the parties were split. Whilst Sinn Féin had opposed passing welfare reform, the Democratic Unionist Party had attempted to do so, arguing that it was inevitable, and that failure to do so would incur further fines from London. A primary aim of the Stormont House Agreement, particularly from the perspective of the UK Government, was to resolve the welfare dispute, and have reform passed.

== Contents of agreement ==
The agreement was omnibus in nature, and included a myriad of different subjects. The agreement exists within the paradigm created by the earlier peace agreements signed between 1998 and 2007, and augments them.

=== The past, flags, and parades ===
In an attempt to resolve the disputes in this area the signatories agreed to the establishment of a Commission on Flags, Identity, Culture and Tradition. This will be in place by June 2015, to report no later than 18 months thereafter. The commission will be composed of fifteen members, of whom seven shall be selected by the leaders of the Northern Irish parties. The DUP and Sinn Féin shall each be entitled to two members, with the next three largest parties getting one each. The remaining eight members shall be drawn from outside of government.

In principle, it was agreed that the responsibility for parades should be devolved to the Northern Ireland Assembly.

To ensure the legacy of the Troubles was not forgotten it was agreed that an Oral History Archive be established to allow persons involved to share experience of the Troubles. An independent body named the Historical Investigations Unit will be set up to investigate outstanding criminal killings and alleged police misconduct that occurred during, and in connection with, the Troubles. It will be overseen by the Northern Ireland Policing Board.

=== Fiscal policies ===
The agreement binds the Northern Ireland Executive to pass a final balanced budget by January 2015. The British Government agreed to provide a financial package to Northern Ireland of an additional £2 billion from 2014 to 2020.

It is also envisaged that the Executive will institute "a comprehensive programme of Public Sector Reform and Restructuring". This will be aided by an independent strategic review to be conducted by the OECD by the end of 2015.

Corporation Tax was agreed to be devolved from Westminster to Belfast by 2017, provided that the rest of the agreement is implemented by Northern Irish parties first.

=== Welfare reform ===
The agreement binds the parties to implementing welfare reform in Northern Ireland on a similar basis to that which was implemented in Great Britain by the Welfare Reform Act 2012.

=== Devolution reform ===
The agreement slightly alters the structure of the Northern Ireland institutions. The number of representatives in the Northern Ireland Assembly was agreed to be reduced, from six MLAs per Westminster constituency to five in time for the 2021 Assembly election (however this was actually implemented in 2017 due to the calling of an early election). It is also envisaged that reforms will be put in place to allow parties to decline from joining the Northern Ireland Executive, and instead receive funding as an official opposition, as occurs in other legislative bodies in Ireland and the UK. By the 2016 election the number of Stormont departments will be reduced from twelve to nine.

=== Irish language ===
The UK and Irish governments reaffirmed their commitment to recognising the Irish language in Northern Ireland. However, the agreement does not create any binding clauses on the recognition of official status for Irish.

== Reaction ==
The signing of the agreement was met with broad support by a majority of Northern Irish political parties but not the Ulster Unionist Party and outside governments. The Northern Irish Trade Union movement, however, was not as supportive of the agreement staging a number of protests and public meetings against the agreement and the majority of ICTU affiliated public service unions held a one-day strike on 13 March.

=== Northern Ireland ===
- First Minister Peter Robinson: The deal is "as much as and more than we have ever been able to do on these issues in the past. So it is a very significant agreement."
- Deputy First Minister Martin McGuinness: "We're proud of our achievement, I think it is remarkable that we managed against all odds, when people told us it couldn't be done to achieve this in the interests of those [vulnerable] people. I think that is something to be proud of."

Sinn Féin eventually withdrew from the deal days before the trade union strike.

=== United Kingdom ===
- Prime Minister David Cameron: "I am delighted that a workable agreement has been reached that can allow Northern Ireland to enjoy a brighter, more prosperous future, while at the same time finally being able to deal with its past."
- Secretary of State Theresa Villiers: I believe this is a genuine step forward, real progress on some of the most critical issues for Northern Ireland and I'd like to express my strong thanks to all of Northern Ireland's political leaders who have participated in this process.

=== Ireland ===
- Minister of Foreign Affairs Charles Flanagan: "Today we are building on the hard-won peace on this island with a new agreement which aims to further reconciliation and foster economic growth."

=== United States ===
- President Barack Obama: "when there is a will and the courage to overcome the issues that have divided the people of Northern Ireland, there is a way to succeed for the benefit of all"
- Secretary of State John Kerry: "This is statesmanship, pure and simple, and leadership by all parties to break a political impasse and avoid a fiscal crisis by resolving complex budgetary and welfare issues."
- Meghan O'Sullivan (who had co-chaired the Haass talks): "[these proposals] really do offer a new way forward for Northern Ireland and its people".

== Implementation ==
The implementation of the agreement has been delayed due to disagreements about welfare reform, and controversy about paramilitary activity. The Committee on the Administration of Justice, and academics from the Institute for the Study of Conflict Transformation and the Transitional Justice Institute have drafted a Model Implementation Bill for the elements of the agreement that deal with the past. A group of civil society activists and academics have adopted a set of gender principles for dealing with the legacy of the conflict to address this gap in the agreement.
