= Ulster University School of Law =

Law school in Northern Ireland

- Focus: Legal Education, Research
- Head of School: Dr Esther McGuinness
- Faculty: Faculty of Social Sciences
- Staff: 30
- Owner: Ulster University
- Location: Ulster University at Jordanstown; Magee College, Northern Ireland, United Kingdom
- Website: ulster.ac.uk/law/

The Ulster University School of Law is a School of Ulster University which is physically located at the Belfast and Magee campuses. The School was also located at the Jordanstown campus prior to moving to the new Belfast City Centre campus in August 2022.

== Academics ==
The School runs a range of undergraduate LLB Law degrees, both single honours and major/minor combinations, at both the Belfast and Magee campuses with an annual cohort of around 150 full-time students across the two campuses. Degrees at Belfast include Law; Law with Politics; Law with Criminology; Accounting and Law (double-degree programme opening pathway to professional qualification in either (or both) Accountancy and Law. Magee degrees include Law, Law with Irish, Law with Accounting, Law with Marketing. All degrees are qualifying law degrees in England and Wales, and Northern Ireland. They can be studied on a full-time or part-time basis. The School offers the possibility for students to undertake year-long study abroad as part of the Erasmus and Study USA programmes, as well as numerous shorter study abroad opportunities.

The School at Belfast offers an LLM programme in Access to Justice (involving practical advocacy experience with the award-winning Ulster Law Clinic) alongside LLM offerings in Employment Law and Practice, Corporate Law, Innovation and Computing, and International Commercial Law and ADR.

The School has 20 doctoral researchers, most working with the Transitional Justice Institute or Ulster Law Clinic. The Doctoral College supports all doctoral students in the university.

The School offers several short courses including Law and Technology; Equality Law, and Gender and Transition in Jordanstown.

== Research ==
The School supports research on a range of doctrinal and sociolegal topics, especially access to justice and more broadly law and social justice. The Transitional Justice Institute supports research on transitional justice, conflict, human rights, international law and gender equality.

=== Research Ranking ===
==== 2008 ====
In the Research Assessment Exercise (RAE) process in 2008, Ulster was ranked 13th out of 64 Law submissions in the UK.

==== 2014 ====
In the 2014 Research Excellence Framework(REF) 2014 Law at Ulster University was ranked 4th overall in the UK (based on GPA). As a result, 88% of all work was deemed to be "internationally excellent or world leading". Concerning the new impact criterion, Law was ranked 1st in the UK, with 100% of impact rated as world-leading. In addition, 100% of research submitted was given an impact and environment rating of 3* or 4*. As a consequence, Ulster was described as a 'surprise strong-performer' and a 'plucky Northern Irish upstart'.

== Governance ==
The School is run by the Head of School who reports to the Executive Dean of the Faculty of Arts Humanities and Social Sciences. The School is home to the Ulster Law Clinic, Transitional Justice Institute, and Legal Innovation Centre.

The School was established in 1992.

=== Ulster University Law Clinic ===
The School has a legal clinic programme. The Ulster University Law Clinic is based in the Belfast campus. It offers free legal advice on social security and employment law. Students from the Clinical Legal Education programme manage the Clinic under staff supervision. The Clinic has won awards for its access to justice work: in 2014 the Law Clinic won the prestigious national award for the best new pro bono activity in the UK. The Law Clinic teaching team was awarded Ulster University's Distinguished Teaching Fellowship (Team Award) 2014. In 2016 the programme won the GradIreland Postgraduate Law Course of the Year. The Clinic won Ulster University's Best New Placement Provider Award 2014. The programme has also been highly commended, being shortlisted for the LawWorks & Attorney General Award 2016, for best pro bono student activity in the UK and only law school in the UK to receive a nomination for The Hague Institute for the Internationalisation of Law ‘Justice Innovation’ 2014.

== People ==
- Professor Cath Collins was the Chatham House Research Fellow for Latin America (2005-2007)
- Professor Eugene McNamee was awarded the Fulbright Northern Ireland Public Affairs Scholar Award in 2014.
- Professor Gráinne McKeever is on the UK's Social Security Advisory Committee.
- Dr Catherine O'Rourke was awarded the 2010 Basil Chubb Prize for the best PhD produced in any field of politics in an Irish university.
- Dr Venkat Iyer is a member of the Northern Ireland Law Commission.
- Mrs Amanda Zacharopoulou was awarded the university's Distinguished Teaching and Learning Fellowship in 2011.
- Ulster Law student Duncan McGregor beat more than 5000 undergraduates from across Ireland to be crowned the 2013 gradireland National Student Challenge winner.
- Ulster graduate Mark Bell is Regius Professor of Laws (Dublin) Trinity College Dublin
- Former Head of School Professor Brice Dickson was the first Chief Commissioner of the Northern Ireland Human Rights Commission
- Visiting Professor Les Allamby was appointed the fourth Chief Commissioner of the Northern Ireland Human Rights Commission in 2014
