= Diplock court =

Non-jury criminal courts in Northern Ireland

Diplock courts were criminal courts in Northern Ireland for non-jury trial of specified serious crimes ("scheduled offences"). They were introduced by the Northern Ireland (Emergency Provisions) Act 1973 and used for serious and terrorism-related cases during the Troubles. The Justice and Security (Northern Ireland) Act 2007 ended the automatic use of non-jury trials for scheduled offences but they are still used in Northern Ireland upon certification by the Director of Public Prosecutions on a case-by-case basis.

== Description ==
The Diplock court was not a specially constituted court, but rather an ordinary criminal court before a single judge. From 1991 the relevant court was the Crown Court; before that it was the Belfast City Commission (alternatively the Belfast Recorder's Court until that was abolished in 1975). A Diplock Crown Court usually sat in Belfast but the Lord Chief Justice of Northern Ireland had power to direct a particular case, or class of cases, or part of a case, to be heard elsewhere.

The list of scheduled offences required to be tried by Diplock court included:

- the common law offences of murder, manslaughter, arson, and riot.
- statutory offences relating to explosives, firearms, rioting, and subversion, as defined under the Malicious Damage Act 1861, Offences against the Person Act 1861, Explosive Substances Act 1883, and several acts passed in 1968 and 1969 in response to the outbreak of the Troubles.

For some scheduled offences, the Attorney General for Northern Ireland could specify a jury trial of a particular case, so that for example a non-political murder would not use the Diplock courts.

== History ==
The courts were established in response to a report submitted to the UK Parliament in December 1972 by Lord Diplock, which addressed the issue of dealing with physical force Irish republicanism through means other than internment (which had been implemented in August 1971). In his report, Diplock cited two primary reasons for his recommendation that jury trials should be suspended:

- the danger of perverse acquittals, and,
- that jurors had been threatened, "of which we have had ample evidence".

Gerald Gardiner's Minority Report as part of the Parker Report in March 1972 found "no evidence of [intimidation] or of perversity in juries". The report marked the beginning of the policy of "criminalisation", whereby the State removed legal distinctions between political violence and normal crime, with political prisoners treated as common criminals. The report provided the basis for the Northern Ireland (Emergency Provisions) Act 1973, which, although later amended (with the Prevention of Terrorism (Temporary Provisions) Act 1974 and subsequent renewals), continued as the basis for counter-terrorist legislation in the UK.

Two years later, Lord Gardiner's review of the removal of trial by jury included attempts to bolster Diplock's findings as follows:

We are convinced on the evidence that we have received, that if juries were to be reintroduced for scheduled offences, their verdicts would still be subject to the influences of intimidation, or the fear of it. We have no evidence of this or of perversity in juries ...

The establishment of the Diplock Courts can be seen as an early example of the Provisional Irish Republican Army's (IRA's) long-term aim of making "the Six Counties ... ungovernable except by colonial military rule". This was a central pillar of the "Long War" strategy set out in the 1977 Green Book.

Diplock courts mainly tried republican or loyalist paramilitaries. In the first case in which a person not associated with the Troubles was tried and convicted, Abbas Boutrab, a suspected al-Qaeda sympathiser, was found guilty of having information that could assist bombing an airliner. A sentence of six years was handed down on 20 December 2005.

Conviction rates in Diplock courts were not considerably higher than in jury trials. Between 1984 and 1986 the conviction rate was 51%, compared to 49% for jury trials in Northern Ireland and 50% in England and Wales. The number of cases heard in Diplock courts reached a peak of 329 yearly in the mid-1980s. With the Northern Ireland peace process and paramilitary ceasefires of the latter 1990s, that figure fell to 60 a year in the mid-2000s. The 1998 Good Friday Agreement underpinning the peace process included a British commitment to "security normalisation" including abolition of Diplock courts. Sinn Féin pressed for this in the agreement negotiations, arguing that lack of juries denied accused republicans of the right to a fair trial. On 1 August 2005, the Northern Ireland Office announced that the Diplock courts were to be phased out, and in August 2006 they announced that the courts were to be abolished effective July 2007. This was achieved under the Justice and Security (Northern Ireland) Act 2007.

== Post-2007 non-jury trials ==
The Criminal Justice Act 2003, applicable throughout the UK, allows jury-less trials where there is a risk of jury tampering (s.44).

The Justice and Security (Northern Ireland) Act 2007 abolished the idea of "scheduled offences" automatically tried without a jury. Instead it allows for the Director of Public Prosecutions for Northern Ireland to certify a non-jury trial for any indictable offence provided it was committed either from a motive of "religious or political hostility" or by on behalf of a group which is both proscribed under the Terrorism Act 2000 and "connected with the affairs of Northern Ireland". The act seeks to address the concerns which led to the establishment of Diplock courts by enhancing jurors' anonymity to prevent intimidation, and increasing randomised juror selection to prevent bias.

The Northern Ireland Office's explanatory notes for the 2007 act characterise its changes as "repeal" of "the Diplock system" and its replacement with "a new system of non-jury trial". On the other hand, courts in such trials have much the same format as the pre-2007 Diplock courts, and have been called "Diplock courts" in the media.

== List of famous cases tried in Diplock courts ==
- Shankill Butchers
- Sean Kelly, who perpetrated the Shankill Road bombing
- The Christy Walsh case
- The Milltown Cemetery attack
- The corporals killings
- Danny Morrison
- R v McCormick (1978) NI: Justice McGonigal ruled that slaps of the hand were permissible and not a form of torture or "degrading and inhumane treatment".

== See also ==
- Special Criminal Court: Republic of Ireland's equivalent of the Diplock courts
- Court of Castle Chamber
