= Brice Dickson =

Irish legal academic

Brice Dickson is a barrister from Northern Ireland and Emeritus Professor of International and Comparative Law at the School of Law, Queen's University Belfast. Formerly Professor of Law at the University of Ulster, he became the first Chief Commissioner of the Northern Ireland Human Rights Commission (NIHRC) on its establishment in 1999, serving two three-year terms. He was a key figure related to the Holy Cross dispute in which Loyalists sought to blockade a Catholic primary school in the Ardoyne area of North Belfast. After his time on the Commission Dickson worked as a Professor of International and Comparative Law at Queen's University Belfast from 2005 until his retirement in 2017.

== Holy Cross ==
At a meeting with the Commission on 25 October 2001 the Chief Constable of the RUC, Ronnie Flanagan, assured Commissioners that everything the police were doing operationally was driven by what was in the best interests of the children attending Holy Cross school. This was also emphasised in a letter he sent to Brice Dickson on 7 November 2001 in response to a suggestion by Dickson that Commissioners who had been present on the Ardoyne Road felt that on several occasions more might have been done by the security forces to protect the children from breaches of their rights. The NIHRC's Casework Committee decided later that month to support a legal action brought by a Holy Cross mother who sought judicial review of the handling of the dispute by the then police force, the Royal Ulster Constabulary (RUC), who became the Police Service of Northern Ireland on 4 November. Dickson and some of his fellow Commissioners disagreed with the decision because it flew in the face of an earlier decision by the full Commission not to fund a case on the matter and they wrote to the then Chief Constable, Ronnie Flanagan, to say that they did not think there was majority support within the Commission for the legal action against him.

The letter was disclosed to the other Commissioners at the time but was later referred to in correspondence from the Chief Constable to Brice Dickson when he wrote stating he would make the letter public in the course of the legal proceedings and "very strongly urge[d] the Commission to review its funding decision" and "strongly" maintained that it was inappropriate for the Commission to continue to commit public funds to this litigation.

The judicial review application against the RUC/PSNI continued to receive support from the NIHRC, but it ultimately failed in the High Court before Kerr J in 2004, in the Court of Appeal of Northern Ireland before Campbell LJ, Sheil LJ and Gillen J in 2006 and in the House of Lords in 2008. These courts all held that, while policing the protestors near the Holy Cross school, the police had not violated the Article 3 right of any child or any other person to be protected against ill-treatment (citing the decision of the Grand Chamber of the European Court of Human rights in Osman v UK). The leading judgment in the House of Lords was given by Lord Carswell, a former Lord Chief Justice of Northern Ireland. Lady Hale, a future President of the Supreme Court and well known for her enthusiasm for protecting children's rights, agreed with Lord Carswell and said (at para 14): 'Hindsight is a wonderful thing and no doubt the police have learned lessons from this whole experience. But in a highly charged community dispute such as this, it is all too easy to find fault with what the authorities have done, when the real responsibility lies elsewhere'. The applicant then took her case to the European Court of Human Rights in Strasbourg, but that Court refused to hear arguments on its merits because it thought that the application was inadmissible as it was 'manifestly ill-founded', that is, there was no reasonable case to be made for saying that the police had violated Article 3 of the European Convention on Human Rights.

== The Commission's proposals for a Bill of Rights ==
Beginning in March 2000 the Commission engaged in a very wide-ranging consultation on what should be contained in a potential Bill of Rights for Northern Ireland. In 2003 two Commissioners, Christine Bell and Inez McCormack, having already agreed to the Commission's draft Bill of Rights proposals, decided to resign from the Commission over the proposals. Without giving prior notice, another Commissioner, Patrick Yu, also resigned at a later date citing concerns with the Commission's advice, and two further commissioners, Frank McGuinness and Paddy Kelly, 'withdrew' from Commission meetings but were still paid by the Northern Ireland Office. One Commissioner, Rev Harold Good, later wrote a piece for Fortnight Magazine describing what it was like being on such a fractious Commission: 'even 35 years within diverse voluntary and public bodies did not prepare me for the way in which some members acted within meetings of the Commission'.

When Dickson's second term as Chief Commissioner came to an end in February 2005 (he was ineligible for a third term) the UK Government left the NIHRC without a chair for some months before Professor Monica McWilliams took over in September 2005. The Commission which she chaired finally submitted its advice to the Secretary of State for Northern Ireland in December 2008. The then Labour UK government rejected the advice and no Bill of Rights for Northern Ireland has since reached the statute book.
