= David Kretzmer =

Israeli professor of international law

David Kretzmer (Hebrew: דוד קרצמר; born 4 November 1943) is an Israeli expert in international and constitutional law. He is professor emeritus of international law of the Hebrew University in Jerusalem and professor of law at the Transitional Justice Institute at the University of Ulster in Northern Ireland. He has been a member of international and Israeli Human Rights organizations, including the UN Human Rights Committee under the International Covenant on Civil and Political Rights, serving as its vice-chairperson in 2001 and 2002. He established the Centre for Human Rights at the Hebrew University of Jerusalem and was a founding member of the Association for Civil Rights in Israel, the Minerva Centre for Human Rights, a joint centre of the Hebrew University and Tel Aviv University. He is also a founding member of B'Tselem. Kretzmer is a member of the Israeli Law Professors' Forum for Democracy, established in 2023 to respond to the Israeli coalition's plans for changes in the legal system.

== Life and career ==
Kretzmer was born in Johannesburg, South Africa, and emigrated to Israel in 1963. He received his Bachelor of Laws from the Hebrew University of Jerusalem in 1967, and his Master of Laws in 1972. He worked as a law clerk to Justice Zvi Berinson at the Supreme Court of Israel from 1966 to 1967, and with the firm of Yigal Arnon in Jerusalem until 1968, when he was admitted to the Israeli Bar. He was teaching assistant to Aharon Barak and became part-time teacher at the Faculty of Law of the Hebrew University in 1969 and worked as an advocate with D.M. Schlosberg, Advocates in Tel-Aviv until 1972, when he entered Osgoode Hall Law School at York University in Toronto, Canada, where he obtained a Doctor of Laws in 1975 with a dissertation about Aims and functions of the tort system of loss allocation. He became lecturer in law at the Hebrew University in 1975, being appointed to the Louis Marshall Chair of Environmental Law in 1976 and to senior lecturer in 1978. From 1981 till 1984 he was vice-dean for students’ affairs at the Faculty of Law of the Hebrew University and became associate professor in 1984 and full professor in 1991, when he was appointed both professor of the Faculty of Social Sciencies' School of Public Policy and the Faculty of Law, where he held the Bruce W. Wayne Chair of International Law until 2006.

He was Visiting Professor of Law at the University of Southern California, Tulane University, Bar-Ilan University, Columbia University, and Visiting Fellow at the MIT in Cambridge, Massachusetts, the Institute for Advanced Legal Studies of the University of London, and the Max Planck Institute for Comparative and Foreign Law in Heidelberg. In 2006 he joined the Transitional Justice Institute (TJI) at the University of Ulster.

His fields of interest are constitutional law, judicial decision-making, human rights and international humanitarian law. He has taught torts, contract, constitutional law, administrative law, international human rights and international humanitarian law.

Kretzmer was a founding member of the Association for Civil Rights in Israel in 1972 and served as chairperson on its executive board. In 1993 he established the Centre for Human Rights at the Hebrew University, and from 1997 till 2000 he served as first academic director of the Minerva Centre for Human Rights, a joint centre of the Hebrew University and Tel Aviv University. He was a member of the UN Human Rights Committee under the International Covenant on Civil and Political Rights from 1995 to 2002, and vice-chairperson in 2001 and 2002. He was on the founding council of the Israeli Information Center for Human Rights in the Occupied Territories B'Tselem, and is a member of its executive board, and served on the first executive committee of HaMoked, the Center for Defence of the Individual in Israel. He was elected a commissioner of the International Commission of Jurists in 2003 and re-elected in 2008.

In 2010, the Minerva Center for Human Rights established a research fellowship for research in Human Rights Law in honor of Kretzmer and his late wife Marcia.

== Publications ==
Books and Book chapters

- — (1981). תקיפה וכליאת שוא (Tekifah u-kheliʼat shav; Assault and false imprisonment) (in Hebrew). Jerusalem: Hebrew University. OCLC 233330765.
- — (1984). Israel and the West Bank: Legal issues. Jerusalem: West Bank Data Base Project. OCLC 15137082.
- — (1985) [First published 1979/80]. מיטרדים (Mitradim; Nuisances) (in Hebrew). Jerusalem: Hebrew University. OCLC 318020188.
- — (1990) [First published 1987]. The Legal Status of the Arabs in Israel. Westview Press. ISBN 978-08133-7762-9.
- — (2000). "Basic Laws as a Surrogate Bill of Rights: The Case of Israel". In Philip Alston (ed.). Promoting Human Rights through Bills of Rights. Oxford University Press. ISBN 978-019825822-3.
- Co-edited with Francine Kershman Hazan (2000). Freedom of speech and incitement against democracy. The Hague: Kluwer Law International. ISBN 90-411-1341-X. OCLC 43096755.
- — (2002). The Occupation of Justice: The Supreme Court of Israel and the Occupied Territories. State University of New York. ISBN 0-7914-5338-3.
- Co-edited with Eckart Klein (2002). The Concept of Human Dignity in International Human Rights Discourse. The Hague: Kluwer Law International. ISBN 90-411-1783-0.
- — (2007). "Civilian Immunity in War: Legal Aspects". In Igor Primoratz (ed.). Civilian Immunity in War. Oxford University Press. pp. 84–112. ISBN 978-0-19-929074-1.
- Co-editor (Summer 2007). Parallel applicability of international humanitarian law and international human rights law. Jerusalem: Hebrew University of Jerusalem, Faculty of Law. Israel law review, Special issue. Volume 40, No 2.

Recent articles

- — (9 January 2005). "Clinging hypocritically to civil rights. A basic principle of our legal system is that the government and military authorities do not have the power to seize private property without clearly being authorized to do so under the law". Haaretz. Archived from the original on 11 July 2012.
- — (2005). "Human Rights". Israel Affairs. 1 (11): 39–64. doi:10.1080/1353712042000324445. S2CID 216148017.
- — (2005). "Targeted Killings of Suspected Terrorists: Extra-Judicial Execution or Legitimate Means of Self Defence?" (PDF). European Journal of International Law. 2 (16): 171. doi:10.1093/ejil/chi114.
- — (2005). "The Advisory Opinion: The Light Treatment of International Humanitarian Law". American Journal of International Law. 99 (99): 88–102. doi:10.2307/3246092. JSTOR 3246092. S2CID 145442406.
- — (2005). "The Supreme Court of Israel: Judicial Review During Armed Conflict". German Yearbook of International Law (47): 392.
- — (14 January 2010). "Exposing a legal fiction. The problem with Highway 443 can be attributed to the unwillingness of Israeli society to understand that the way it has administered the territories since 1967 is founded on hypocrisy, fraud and a trampling of rights". Haaretz. Archived from the original on 11 July 2012.
