= Transitional Justice Institute =

Research institute in Ireland

- The institute's logo which encompasses the University logo^{(left)} and the Institute's logo^{(right)}.
- Established: 2003
- Focus: Transitional Justice, Conflict, Human Rights Law, and International Law
- Director: Prof Siobhán Wills
- Faculty: Faculty of Social Sciences
- Staff: 15–20 staff
- Subsidiaries: 4 research streams
- Owner: Ulster University
- Location: Ulster University at Jordanstown; Magee College, Northern Ireland, United Kingdom
- Website: transitionaljustice.ulster.ac.uk/

The Ulster University's Transitional Justice Institute (TJI), is a law-led multidisciplinary research institute of Ulster University which is physically located at the Jordanstown, and Magee campuses. It was created in 2003, making it the first and longest-established university research centre on this theme. In the 2014 Research Excellence Framework (REF) Law at Ulster University was ranked 4th overall in the UK. Ulster was ranked first for impact in law with 100% of impact rated as world-leading, the only University to achieve this in law.

Within the institute, there are over 15 researchers based on the Jordanstown and Magee campuses of the university. In addition, the TJI has approximately 15 doctoral students researching and studying towards their chosen topics. Visiting scholars and visiting professors are often closely involved in research.

The institute is internationally recognised, receiving recognition from the American Society of International Law in 2006 with TJI scholars being awarded top book and article prize for creative and outstanding contributions to international legal scholarship. Staff have been awarded the 2009 Hart SLSA Early Career Award and jointly awarded the 2009 British Society of Criminology Book Prize as well as the 2010 Basil Chubb Prize for the best PhD produced in any field of politics in an Irish university. The institute is associated with the Association of Human Rights Institutes (AHRI).

In line with the university's rebranding in October 2014 the institute updated its logo. The TJI undertakes research on transitional justice, conflict, international law, human rights and gender equality.

== Research ==
The institute has four main research streams or clusters:

- Dealing with the Past
- Gender, Conflict and Transition
- Northern Ireland – Local and Global Perspectives
- Theory Method and Evaluation

=== Projects ===
Projects include the Belfast Guidelines on Amnesty and Accountability; the Transitional Justice Grassroots Toolkit (with Bridge of Hope); TJI Principles for Transformative Reparations; databases on peace agreements. TJI staff have helped author the Gender Principles for Dealing with the Legacy of the Past and participated in a project to draft a Model Implementation bill for the Stormont House Agreement. In 2015 the TJI joined a DFID funded collaborative project on Political Settlements. TJI scholarship and policy work has been widely cited by international organisations including in a UN study on UNSCR 1325, the Trust Fund for Victims of the International Criminal Court and in judgments of international courts.

Other TJI projects include:

- Commemoration and Law: Narratives of Political Violence in Transitional and Conflicted Societies
- An Investigation of Use of Force by UN Peacekeeping Operations
- Picturing Peace: Murals, Conflict and Transition in Colombia
- Policing and Forensic Issues in the Search for Truth and/or Justice for Forced Disappearance
- Political Capacity Building: Advancing a Bill of Rights for Northern Ireland
- Role of Databases in Transitional Justice Research

=== RAE 2008 ===
The TJI manages the Law submission in the RAE and REF process for Ulster University. In the Research Assessment Exercise (RAE) process in 2008, the Ulster was ranked 13th out of 64 Law submissions in the UK.

=== REF 2014 ===
In the 2014 Research Excellence Framework (REF) Law at Ulster University was ranked 4th overall in the UK (based on GPA) out of more than 60 law submissions. As a result, 88% of all work was deemed to be internationally excellent or world leading. Concerning the new impact criterion, Law was ranked 1st in the UK, with 100% of impact rated as world-leading (4 *). In addition, 100% of research submitted was given an impact and environment rating of 3* or 4*. In terms of research intensity, Law at Ulster was ranked 9th in the UK.

The 4* impact case studies were:

- Amnesty, Accountability and Victims' Rights in Peace Processes
- Framing Transitional Justice Practice: Dealing with the Past in Northern Ireland
- Gender, Conflict and Transition

== Education ==
The TJI, in cooperation with the Ulster University School of Law offers masters programmes in Human Rights and Transitional Justice, and Gender, Conflict and Human Rights. It also runs a short course in Gender and Transition and in Equality Law.

== Governance ==
The TJI is led by a director. The institute has staff from the School of Law and the School of Applied Social and Policy Sciences.

Directors have included:

- Professor Siobhán Wills (2021-date)
- Dr Catherine O'Rourke (2020–2021)
- Professor Rory O'Connell. (2014–2020)
- Professor Bill Rolston (2010–2014)

Associate Directors have included:

- Professor Fionnuala Ní Aoláin (-present)

The TJI was created in 2003, with a grant from Atlantic Philanthropies.

== People ==
Staff members:

- Professor Fionnuala Ní Aoláin was appointed the UN Special Rapporteur on Protecting Human Rights While Countering Terrorism in 2017. She is concurrently the Regents Professor and Robina Chair in Law, Public Policy and Society at the University of Minnesota University of Minnesota Law School and a professor of law at the Ulster University's Transitional Justice Institute in Belfast, Northern Ireland. She was formerly the Dorsey & Whitney Chair in Law at Minnesota. Her 2006 book, Law in Times of Crisis (Cambridge University Press), was awarded the Certificate of Merit for creative scholarship in 2007, the American Society of International Law's preeminent prize. She has been nominated twice (2004 and 2007) by the Irish government to the European Court of Human Rights, the first woman and the first academic lawyer to be thus nominated. She was appointed by the Irish Minister of Justice to the Irish Human Rights Commission in 2000 and served until 2005. In 2017 she was named as a candidate for the position of Special Rapporteur on the promotion and protection of human rights and fundamental freedoms while countering terrorism. Prof Ní Aoláin has received Ulster's Distinguished Researcher (Senior) Award in 2016.
- Professor Monica McWilliams played an active part in the multi-party negotiations that led to the intergovernmental Good Friday Agreement in 1998. Prof McWilliams was the second Chief Commissioner of the Northern Ireland Human Rights Commission. She received Ulster University's Distinguished Enterprise Award in December 2014. She was a member of the Fresh Start Agreement panel examining the issue of paramilitariasm in Northern Ireland. Prof Monica McWilliams has been appointed to the Fresh Start Independent Monitoring Commission.
- Professor Brandon Hamber is a former director of INCORE. He holds the John Hume and Thomas P. O’Neill Chair in Peace.
- Professor Cath Collins was the Chatham House Research Fellow for Latin America (2005–2007)
- Professor Louise Mallinder was awarded the 2009 Hart SLSA Early Career Award and jointly awarded the 2009 British Society of Criminology Book Prize
- Dr Catherine O'Rourke was awarded the 2010 Basil Chubb Prize for the best PhD produced in any field of politics in an Irish university. She was also awarded a Fulbright Scholarship in 2016.
- Dr Jessica Doyle was awarded the 2016 Basil Chubb Prize for the best PhD produced in any field of politics in an Irish university.
- Research Manager Lisa Thompson and Clerical Support Elaine McCoubrey have each won Ulster's Distinguished Service Award.

Former staff members:

- Professor David Kretzmer
- Professor Colm Campbell
- Professor Christine Bell
- Professor Tom Hadden

The TJI External Board include:

- Professor Diane Marie Amann
- Professor Christine Bell
- Professor Bill Bowring
- Professor Chris McCrudden
- Professor Ruth Rubio Marin
- Professor Ruti Teitel
- Dr Nahla Valji

== See also ==
- Ulster University School of Law
- Transitional Justice
