= Justice and Security (Northern Ireland) Act 2007 =

Act of the Parliament of the United Kingdom

Justice and Security (Northern Ireland) Act 2007 (Note: Section 54.)
- Act of Parliament
- Parliament of the United Kingdom
- Long title: An Act to make provision about justice and security in Northern Ireland.
- Citation: 2007 c. 6
- Introduced by: Peter Hain MP, Secretary of State for Northern Ireland (Commons); Lord Rooker (Lords)
- Territorial extent: England and Wales (in part); Scotland (in part); Northern Ireland; (Note: Section 52.)

Dates
- Royal assent: 24 May 2007
- Commencement: Various (Note: Section 53.)
Other legislation
Amends	Juries (Northern Ireland) Order 1996; Northern Ireland Act 1998; Terrorism Act 2000; Northern Ireland (Miscellaneous Provisions) Act 2006
Amended by	Domestic Violence, Crime and Victims Act 2004

Status: Amended

History of passage through Parliament

Text of statute as originally enacted

Text of the Justice and Security (Northern Ireland) Act 2007 as in force today (including any amendments) within the United Kingdom, from legislation.gov.uk.

The Justice and Security (Northern Ireland) Act 2007 (c. 6) is an act of the Parliament of the United Kingdom. Its purpose is to facilitate security normalisation in Northern Ireland.

== Provisions ==
The act's main provisions are to:

- provide for jury reform and to establish a new system of non-jury trial after the abolition of Diplock courts
- reform the powers of the Armed Forces, police and the Secretary of State
- extend the Security Industry Authority to include Northern Ireland
- extend the responsibilities of the Northern Ireland Human Rights Commission

The act includes provisions to allow police to conduct stops and searches for munitions and wireless devices. Police do not require "reasonable suspicion" to conduct a stop and search - instead the Act only requires that it be a part of counter-terror laws or there is a risk of serious violence or disorder.

Under the act, non-jury trials require the Director of Public Prosecutions to issue a certificate, where the administration of justice may be impacted by there being a jury trial. Three of the conditions for this to happen relate to proscribed organisations.

=== Section 8 - Supplementary ===
Section 8(4) extended section 4 of the Terrorism (Northern Ireland) Act 2006.

=== Section 53 - Commencement ===
Orders made under section 53(4):

- The Justice and Security (Northern Ireland) Act 2007 (Commencement No.1 and Transitional Provisions) Order 2007] (SI 2007/2045 (C.76))
- The Justice and Security (Northern Ireland) Act 2007 (Commencement No.2) Order 2007] (SI 2007/3069 (C.121))
- The Justice and Security (Northern Ireland) Act 2007 (Commencement No.3) Order 2009] (SI 2009/446 (C.29))

== Reception ==
Ian Paisley Junior criticised the extension of additional powers to the Northern Ireland Human Rights.

== Bibliography ==
- Current Law Statutes Annotated 2007
- Clive Walker. Terrorism and the Law. Oxford University Press. 2011. pp 28, 29, 57, 92, 162, 255, 397, 494 to 499, 504, 515 and 526.
