= Construction amnesty =

Turkish law that legalizes illegal construction

Construction amnesty, also known as reconstruction peace, building permit forgiveness and zoning reconciliation (Turkish: imar barışı or imar affı), is any set of Turkish law to register and legalize nominally illegal construction. Amnesty is (retroactively) granted to buildings without any planning permission such as gecekondus, and to constructions that disregarded official building codes including fire and earthquake safety regulations. Zoning amnesties generally are awarded by authorities for short term economic and political gain. Amnesty laws have been described as a populist method of soliciting votes by politicians, as their timing often coincided multiple times with various Turkish elections that took place throughout the past couple of decades.

== History ==
The first official zoning amnesty plan was accepted by the parliament in 1984, though it was stated that the government had implemented similar policies in the past going back to late 1940s. The has been a total of 19 zoning amnesties since 1948.

The last construction amnesty in Turkey was accepted by the government in May 2018, five weeks before the 2018 Turkish presidential election, registering and giving occupancy permits (Turkish: yapı kayıt belgesi) to more than 3 million buildings that were not built according to regulations. That amnesty was opposed by Garo Paylan, a lawmaker of the Peoples' and Democracy Party (HDP) at the time. The amnesty become law on 4 June 2018 by being published in the Official Gazette of the Republic of Turkey. As of 2022 more than 7 million buildings have got permits through the 2018 amnesty, 5.8 million of them being residential ones.

In July 2022 a new amnesty plan was proposed by Mustafa Destici, leader of the BBP, which is a member of the People's Alliance. Grand National Assembly of Turkey sent the plan to the internal Committee on Public Works, Reconstruction, Transportation and Tourism for further review in October 2022. The new plan was seen as a move to gain support for the incoming 2023 Turkish presidential election.

== Criticism ==
Since their implementation construction amnesties were criticized by numerous organizations such as Union of Chambers of Turkish Engineers and Architects. After the 2020 Aegean Sea earthquake and 2023 Turkey–Syria earthquake brought the topic back on the public discourse.
