= Northern Ireland Human Rights Commission =

Agency overview
- Formed: 1 March 1999
- Jurisdiction: Northern Ireland
- Headquarters: Alfred House, 19-21 Alfred Street, Belfast BT2 8ED
- Employees: 30
- Annual budget: £1,689,887 (FY 21/22)
- Agency executives: Alyson Kilpatrick, Chief Commissioner; Dr David Russell, Chief Executive
- Parent department: Northern Ireland Office
- Key document: Northern Ireland Act 1998
- Website: https://nihrc.org/

The Northern Ireland Human Rights Commission (NIHRC) is a non-departmental public body funded through the Northern Ireland Office but operating independently of government as the national human rights institution (NHRI) for Northern Ireland. It came into existence on 1 March 1999, having been created by the Parliament of the United Kingdom through section 68 of the Northern Ireland Act 1998, in compliance with a commitment made by the UK Government in the Belfast (Good Friday) Agreement of 10 April 1998. Its powers were amended by the Justice and Security (Northern Ireland) Act 2007.

The Commission broadly succeeded the Standing Advisory Commission on Human Rights (SACR), which was largely ineffective, with SACR demanding, and failing to receive new powers up until its replacement.

== Functions ==
The commission's role is to promote awareness of the importance of human rights in Northern Ireland, to review existing law and practice and to advise the Secretary of State for Northern Ireland and the Executive Committee of the Northern Ireland Assembly on what legislative or other measures ought to be taken to protect human rights in Northern Ireland.

In addition, the commission is able to conduct investigations, enter places of detention (subject to a requirement to give notice), and to compel individuals and agencies to give oral testimony or to produce documents. The commission also has the power to assist individuals when they are bringing court proceedings, to intervene in proceedings and to bring court proceedings itself. It receives enquiries (from 600 to 900 per year) from people who believe that their human rights have been violated, and provides training and information on human rights.

It was also specifically charged with advising on the scope for a bill of rights to supplement the European Convention on Human Rights (which is already part of the law in Northern Ireland as a result of the passing of the Human Rights Act 1998).

The commission is required to maintain a joint committee with the former Irish Human Rights Commission (now the Irish Human Rights and Equality Commission) created to fulfil the same role in the Republic of Ireland.

=== Potential further functions ===
Many of the initial members of the Commission felt that it did not have enough powers to effectively fulfil its mandate. Some powers they wished to gain include:

- Investigatory powers
- Compel people or organizations to testify
- Compel people or organizations to produce documents.

The latter two were granted under the Justice and Security Act (Northern Ireland) 2007.

== History ==
The third Chief Commissioner, Professor Michael O'Flaherty, took office on 19 September 2011, following the early departure on 31 August of Monica McWilliams, who had succeeded the first holder of the office, Professor Brice Dickson, in 2005. There is a variable number of part-time commissioners (currently seven, all appointed from 1 September 2011). The term of office is also variable: up to five years for the Chief Commissioner, and up to three years for other Commissioners. Until 2011, the norm was to offer three-year appointments and to offer a second term. Professor O'Flaherty's appointment was announced in July 2011. He was to serve for five years and the Commissioners for three.

In relation to its mandate to advise on a Bill of Rights, the Commission conducted a very extensive public consultation exercise during Dickson's term as Chief Commissioner. It handed over a draft report to the McWilliams Commission, which engaged in three further years of discussion before producing its report in December 2008 and presenting it to the Secretary of State. From December 2009 to 31 March 2010 the Northern Ireland Office conducted a public consultation on its response to the commission's recommendations, most of which were firmly rejected by the government. The Commission continues to campaign for enactment of a comprehensive Bill but the change of government following the 2010 general election made such an outcome very unlikely.

In August 2010 it was announced that, with effect from April 2013, the commission's budget was to be cut by 25 per cent (from £1.7m in 2010–11). McWilliams, who had been reappointed for a four-year term ending in August 2012, announced that she would depart a year early, when the term of the part-time Commissioners ended. The Commission subsequently underwent a restructuring, losing two of its four management posts in July 2011; other staff posts have since been vacated and the organisation is expected to shrink further as a result of budget cuts.

== International status ==
Although it operates at sub-national level, the NIHRC was in 2001 recognised as a member of the worldwide network of national human rights institutions, securing "B status" accreditation from the International Co-ordinating Committee of NHRIs (ICC), and full or "A status" accreditation in 2006. The Commission thus gained enhanced access to the Human Rights Council, treaty bodies and other United Nations human rights bodies. The NIHRC was the first NHRI in the UK, but following the creation of the Scottish Human Rights Commission (SHRC) and the Equality and Human Rights Commission (EHRC), both now ICC-accredited, the three bodies share representation and voting rights in the ICC and its regional network, the European Group of NHRIs.

The NIHRC has since 1999 engaged in parallel reporting ("shadow reporting") at almost every UK periodic examination under the UN and was designated as part of the United Kingdom's independent mechanism for promoting, monitoring and protecting implementation in the state of the United Nations Convention on the Rights of Persons with Disabilities (CRPD). It shared that role with the other two NHRIs in the UK – the EHRC and SHRC – and a fourth body, the Equality Commission for Northern Ireland (ECNI). Since the 2011 restructuring, which resulted in the departure of staff with disability expertise, the NIHRC has ceased work on the CRPD and the ECNI has in effect become the sole element of the independent mechanism in Northern Ireland.

The NIHRC's ICC accreditation was reviewed in May 2011, and the recommendation for renewed A status became effective in July.

== Criticisms of the NIHRC ==
The NIHRC has been involved in a number of controversies since its creation.

=== Holy Cross case ===
During Brice Dickson's tenure as chief commissioner, the NIHRC became involved in the Holy Cross dispute in which loyalists blockaded a girls' Primary School in Ardoyne, Belfast in 2001 and 2002. Dickson disagreed with a decision by the NIHRC's casework committee to support a parent's legal challenge to the policing of the dispute, and wrote in those terms to the then Chief Constable of the Royal Ulster Constabulary. The letter entered the public domain during the legal proceedings and caused internal disputes in the commission, leading to the resignation of some Commissioners and the 'withdrawal' of two others and criticism of the commission by community leaders. The Commission continued to fund the parent's case, which was ultimately unsuccessful in the House of Lords, which itself was critical of the commission's intervention in the case.

=== Christy Walsh ===
A Belfast man, Christy Walsh, who was imprisoned during the Troubles after conviction in a non-jury Diplock court, sought the NIHRC's support during his lengthy and ultimately successful battle to have his conviction overturned. He has since sought judicial review of its conduct.

=== Acceptance of external funding ===
The NIHRC has also come under criticism for accepting additional funding from Atlantic Philanthropies, including £110,000 to fund its work on the development of proposals for a Bill of Rights for Northern Ireland. The commission was offered an additional £30,000 by Atlantic in 2010, but its sponsor department, the Northern Ireland Office, refused it permission to accept the funding.

=== Association with Lynn Sheridan ===
In June 2011 it was reported that the NIHRC had, in the course of its restructuring, engaged the services of a personnel consultant who had some years previously been struck off the nursing register for cruelty towards elderly patients. The restructuring resulted in a number of Industrial Tribunal (employment court) cases against the commission, which were settled from public funds with clauses binding the claimants to confidentiality.

=== Budget concerns ===
The NIHRC's ability to work on legal cases has been reportedly facing limitations following repeated budget cuts. The human rights watchdog has a budget of only over £1.1m and argues that this figure too has been halved since 2010. Since 2009, the organization's number of staff members also fell from 32 to 14 on four occasions of annual budget cuts, out of the total eight taken place since then.

== See also ==
- Scottish Human Rights Commission
