= Timeline of Real IRA and New IRA actions =

This is a timeline of actions by the Irish republican paramilitary groups referred to as the Real Irish Republican Army ('Real IRA') and New Irish Republican Army ('New IRA'). The Real IRA was formed in 1997 by disaffected members of the Provisional IRA. Since July 2012, when Republican Action Against Drugs (RAAD) and other small republican groups merged with it, the group has been called the New IRA; although it continues to call itself simply "the Irish Republican Army".

It has been the largest and most active of the dissident republican paramilitaries waging a campaign against the British security forces. The other main republican paramilitary groups are the group which calls itself Óglaigh na hÉireann, and the Continuity IRA. All actions listed took place in Northern Ireland unless stated otherwise.

== 1998 ==
Note: for some of the incidents in 1998, it is unclear whether the Real IRA, the Continuity IRA, or both organisations were responsible.

- 6 January: A 500 lb car bomb was defused by the security forces in the centre of Banbridge, County Down. A telephoned warning had been sent.
- 24 January: An explosion in Enniskillen was attributed to those responsible for the Banbridge device.
- 20 February: Following a telephoned warning, a 500 lb car bomb exploded outside the Royal Ulster Constabulary (RUC) base in Moira, County Down. Seven RUC officers and four civilians were hurt. The blast caused widespread damage.
- 23 February: Following a telephoned warning, a 300 lb car bomb exploded near the RUC base on Edward Street in Portadown, County Armagh. The blast caused widespread damage but no injuries.
- 10 March: There was a barrack buster attack on the RUC base on Newry Road in Armagh. Five mortars were launched and three exploded on impact. People were evacuated from the surrounding area after the British Army spotted the launchers, and there were no injuries.
- 24 March: There were two mortar attacks in South Armagh. Four mortars were fired at Forkill British Army/RUC base; one exploded inside the base but caused no injuries. A further two mortars were fired at a British Army watchtower at Glasdrumman, but fell short of the target. It is believed the RIRA was responsible.
- 2 April: A 1000 lb RIRA car bomb was intercepted by Gardaí as it was boarding the Dún Laoghaire-Holyhead ferry in Dublin.
- 30 April: Following a telephoned warning, a 550–600 lb car bomb was defused in the centre of Lisburn. It is believed the RIRA was responsible.
- 1 May: RIRA member Ronan Mac Lochlainn, a native of County Dublin, was shot dead by Gardaí during an attempted robbery of a cash-in-transit van in County Wicklow, Republic of Ireland.
- 4 May: There was an attempted mortar attack on Grosvenor Road RUC base in Belfast. One of the mortars fell short of the target and the other exploded in its launch tube.
- 8 May: The RIRA issued a statement declaring war on the United Kingdom.
- 9 May: There was an attempted mortar attack on the RUC base in Belleek, County Fermanagh. The mortars fell short of the target and one exploded as the RUC was clearing the area. A claim of responsibility was made on behalf of the Real IRA.
- 16 May: Following a telephoned warning, a 500 lb car bomb was defused near the RUC base in Armagh.
- 23 June: The RIRA is believed to have been responsible for an explosion on a road near Forkill, County Armagh.
- 24 June: A 200 lb car bomb exploded in the centre of Newtownhamilton. The INLA issued a 50-minute warning about the bomb, but people were still being evacuated when it exploded and six people were injured. See: Newtownhamilton bombing
- 2 July: An RIRA bomb seriously damaged the Dublin-Belfast railway line at Carnagat, outside Newry.
- 10 July: An RIRA operation targeting London's transport system and commercial premises was foiled following the arrest of several suspected activists in Ireland and England. Police in London retrieved a cache of incendiary devices and a small Semtex bomb.
- 11 July: A 1,400 lb car bomb intended for either Portadown or Armagh city was abandoned outside the Moy, County Armagh because of intense levels of British Army and RUC activity in the area.
- 13 July: Following a telephoned warning, a 635 lb car bomb was defused outside the courthouse in Newry. It is believed the RIRA was responsible.
- 21 July: A mortar was fired at Corry Square RUC base in Newry, but fell short of the target and did not detonate. The Real IRA claimed responsibility.
- 28 July: The RIRA was blamed for planting incendiary bombs in shops in Portadown.
- 1 August: 1998 Banbridge bombing: A 500 lb car bomb exploded in the centre of Banbridge, County Down. Telephoned warnings were sent but the bomb exploded before the area was fully evacuated. Two RUC officers and thirty-three civilians were hurt and the blast caused extensive damage. The Real IRA claimed responsibility.
- 15 August: Omagh bombing: A 500 lb car bomb exploded in the centre of Omagh, County Tyrone. The bomb killed 29 civilians and wounded 220 others. This was the highest death toll from a single attack during the Troubles. Although warnings had been given 38 minutes beforehand, they proved to be insufficient.
- 18 August: The RIRA announced it was suspending all military operations.
- 7 September: The RIRA announced a ceasefire.

== 1999 ==
- 9 May: A 2007 inquest heard that the RIRA were responsible for the killing of Brendan "Speedy" Fegan in Newry, County Down as a purported drug dealer.

== 2000 ==
- 20 January: The RIRA announced an end to its ceasefire.
- 25 February: The RIRA is believed to have been responsible for a bomb attack against a British Army barracks in Ballykelly, County Londonderry. The Continuity IRA initially claimed responsibility for the blast but security sources said they believed it was the RIRA who were responsible.
- 6 April: The RIRA detonated a bomb at Ebrington British Army barracks in Derry. The bomb destroyed an unmanned guardhouse and damaged the perimeter fence.
- 14 April: The RIRA were blamed for a failed mortar bomb attack on an army base in Rosslea, County Fermanagh.
- 24 May: The RIRA were responsible for a mortar bomb attack on a British Army base in Glasdrumman (or Glassdrummond), South Armagh.
- 1 June: The RIRA detonated a small bomb on Hammersmith Bridge in London.
- 19 June: A RIRA bomb was on a railway line at Ealing Broadway in London.
- 20 June: The RIRA were responsible for a leaving an explosive device in the property of former Northern Ireland Secretary of State Peter Mandelson in Hillsborough, County Down.
- 30 June: The RIRA bombed the main Dublin-to-Belfast railway line near Meigh, County Armagh.
- 9 July: The RIRA detonated a car bomb at Stewartstown, County Tyrone RUC station.
- 13 September: The RIRA were responsible for a mortar bomb attack on an RUC station in Armagh town.
- 13 September: The RIRA were responsible for planting two 80 lb bombs at Magilligan British Army camp, County Londonderry, one of which was planted in a wooden hut and partially exploded when a soldier opened the door to the hut. The second bomb was found during a follow-up search and made safe by bomb disposal experts.
- 22 September: The RIRA fired an RPG-22 anti-tank rocket at the headquarters of the Secret Intelligence Service in London.
- 13 October: RIRA member, Joseph O'Connor, a grandson of Francisco Notarantonio (a republican internee shot dead on 9 October 1987), was shot dead in Ballymurphy, Belfast in an intrarepublican feud.
- 24 September: The RIRA were responsible for detonating a 50 lb bomb on a railway line in Dunmurry, County Antrim.
- 1 November: A RIRA booby trap bomb hidden in a traffic cone exploded in Castlewellan, County Down, seriously injuring an RUC officer who lost a leg and two fingers.

== 2001 ==
- 23 January: The RIRA were responsible for a mortar attack on Ebrington Barracks in Derry. One mortar landed inside the perimeter fence of the base after being fired from a parked van. No one was injured.
- 5 February: The RIRA were responsible for a pipe bomb attack in which a couple were injured in Newcastle, County Down. The RIRA would later kill the man, in a gun attack a year later in February 2002.
- 21 February: A RIRA bomb disguised as a torch exploded outside a British Army barracks in Shepherd's Bush, West London, after a 14-year-old army cadet picked it up. The cadet, Stephen Menary, lost his left hand and left eye, and suffered severe stomach and chest injuries.
- 4 March: The RIRA detonated a car bomb outside the BBC's London headquarters (see 4 March 2001 BBC bombing). The explosion was captured by a BBC cameraman and the footage was broadcast on TV stations worldwide, gaining mass publicity for the group.
- 14 April: The RIRA was blamed for a small bomb explosion at a postal sorting office in Hendon, London. No one was injured in the explosion, which caused "minor" damage to the building at The Hyde, in Hendon.
- 23 April: The RIRA were blamed for a grenade attack on an RUC station in Derry.
- 6 May: The RIRA was blamed for a small bomb explosion at the same Hendon building where another bomb had exploded on 14 April 2001. There was no warning and one man was injured in the explosion.
- 15 May: The RIRA was blamed for a mortar attack on an army base in Bessbrook, County Armagh.
- May 27: The RIRA were responsible for a failed rocket attack on an RUC station in Strabane, County Tyrone. The device contained just over one pound of Semtex.
- 8 June: The RIRA was blamed for a gun attack at a polling station in Draperstown, County Londonderry. Two RUC officers and a civilian were wounded.
- 1 August: The RIRA planted a 44 lb car bomb at Belfast International Airport. It was made safe by bomb disposal officers.
- 3 August: The RIRA detonated a car bomb in Ealing, London, injuring seven people (see 3 August 2001 Ealing bombing).
- 22 August: The RIRA planted a small bomb on a bridge in Derry. The group gave a telephoned warning and the bomb was defused.
- 1 November: The RIRA were blamed for planting a faulty incendiary device in a sports shop in Hill Street, Newry, County Down. The device was smouldering in a pocket of the jacket, but had burnt itself out.
- 3 November: The RIRA planted a car bomb in the centre of Birmingham, England but it failed to detonate properly.

== 2002 ==
- 3 January: The RIRA carried out a pipe bomb attack on a police officer's home in Annalong, County Down.
- 26 January: The RIRA were believed to have been responsible for a blast bomb attack during disturbances in north Belfast. Three police officers and two soldiers were injured in the blast.
- 21 February: The RIRA claimed responsibility for the shooting death of Matthew Burns in a car outside Castlewellan, County Down. Burns' brother, the driver, was injured. It is believed the killing was a result of a personal feud between Burns and the RIRA.
- 3 March: Two teenaged boys are injured with a RIRA booby trap bomb in Forkill, County Armagh. The device was hidden inside a traffic cone when it exploded.
- 29 March: The RIRA targeted a former member of the Royal Irish Regiment in Sion Mills, County Tyrone. A bomb was attached to his car but failed to explode.
- 13 April: The RIRA were blamed for two bomb attacks on PSNI stations in Downpatrick and Ardglass, both in County Down.
- 24 April: the RIRA left a 150 lb (68 kg) bomb in a jeep outside Maghaberry jail, near Lisburn. Only the detonator exploded.
- 5 June: The RIRA are believed to have been linked to a kidnapping in Ballyhornan, County Down.
- 17 July: The RIRA claimed responsibility for an attack on a Police Service of Northern Ireland (PSNI) patrol car in Downpatrick, County Down. An explosive device was fired at the car but bounced off and failed to explode.
- 2 August: The RIRA was blamed for detonating a bomb at a British Territorial Army base in Derry. A civilian builder was killed in the blast.
- 20 October: The RIRA claimed responsibility for an attempted bombing of the PSNI station in Castlederg, County Tyrone. A coffee jar bomb packed with shrapnel was thrown over the perimeter fence but failed to explode.
- 24 November: The RIRA were believed to have been responsible for an attempted bombing of a motor tax office in Belfast. The operation was intercepted by undercover police and one of the bombers was severely injured after police fired a number of shots. Two men were arrested at the scene.

== 2003 ==
- 13 March: The RIRA left a bomb in a van outside Laganside Courthouse in Belfast. It was defused by bomb disposal officers.
- 5 April: The RIRA claimed it had sent an incendiary bomb to Maghaberry prison. The bomb was defused by the British army.
- 5 May: The RIRA were responsible for an attempting bombing of a motor tax office in Belfast. The device, which was in a van parked outside the motor tax office in Upper Queen Street, contained three pipe bombs and three fuel containers.
- 19 June: The RIRA abandoned a 1,200 lb van bomb on the outskirts of Derry. The device was described as "one of the biggest ever found in the UK".
- 17 August: The RIRA killed Danny McGurk, a civilian, on the Ross Road, Lower Falls, West Belfast. The RIRA later issued a statement that McGurk had been an "innocent civilian" and offered its "sincere condolences" to his family and friends, adding that the killing was "criminally wrong and detracted from the goal of Irish liberation". McGurk had reportedly had a pub dispute with members of the RIRA, and been beaten by members of the group a week before his killing.
- 3 September: The RIRA were blamed for leaving a roadside bomb near Bryansford, County Down. It was believed to have been meant for a passing PSNI patrol.
- 21 September: The RIRA were blamed for firing a number of shots near the home of Social Democratic and Labour Party councilor Peter Fitzpatrick in Kilcoo, County Down. Fitzpatrick had recently denounced the group and its actions.
- 12 October: The RIRA were responsible for an attempted bombing of a PSNI station in Rosslea, County Fermanagh. A 130 lb car bomb was defused by the British Army.
- 20 November: The RIRA attempted to ambush PSNI and British Army members in Newcastle, County Down. The group claimed there was a bomb at the empty Enniskeen Hotel. However, this was a hoax meant to draw the police and army towards the real bomb. The time bomb was found and made safe.

== 2004 ==
- 4 February: The RIRA claimed responsibility for planting a bomb inside a British Army base at Ballykelly, County Londonderry. It failed to explode.
- 26 March: Four men were charged with RIRA membership after involvement in a RIRA firebomb attack on a house in Cork City, County Cork.
- 8 May: The RIRA were responsible for sending packages containing a number of bullets and a sympathy card to elected representatives on Newry & Mourne District Council. The packages were addressed to the District Policing Partnership members at SDLP premises and council offices in Newry, County Down.
- 8 September: The RIRA claimed responsibility for a gun attack on Strand Road PSNI station in Derry. No one was injured but builders who were working on an extension in the fortified base had to dive for cover as the gunman opened fire.
- 30 September: The RIRA were responsible for sending a parcel bomb to an SDLP councillor, Eamon O'Neill in Castlewellan, County Down.
- 24 November: The RIRA carried out a firebomb attack on a commercial premises in Belfast.

== 2005 ==
- 6 November: The RIRA were blamed for a hoax bomb alert at the Down Royal Racecourse in County Down. The bomb warning disrupted a two-day racing festival in which 9,000 racegoers had to be evacuated.

== 2006 ==
- 9 August: The RIRA carried out a number of firebomb attacks on businesses in Newry, County Down. Buildings belonging to JJB Sports and Carpetright were destroyed, and ones belonging to MFI and TK Maxx were badly damaged.
- 13 August: The RIRA claimed it left two devices on the Belfast–Dublin railway line in south County Armagh, between Newry and Dundalk. The alert caused massive disruption to railway and road traffic in the area.
- 16 August: The RIRA were blamed for an attempted bombing on the home of an Ulster Unionist Peer, Lord Ballyedmond in County Louth.
- 8 September: The RIRA were blamed for a hoax bomb threat against a DPP meeting in Downpatrick, County Down.
- 1 November: The RIRA were responsible for a number of fire bomb attacks on businesses in Belfast. Businesses such as Homebase, Smyths & JJB Sports were badly damaged.
- 4 December: The RIRA are believed to have been responsible for a failed mortar attack on a PSNI Station in Craigavon, County Armagh.

== 2007 ==
- 18 July: The RIRA claimed responsibility for the discovery of two bombs during a security alert in Newry, County Down. One of the devices exploded, while army experts carried out a controlled explosion on the other. It was claimed in a statement that the bombs were intended for use against members of the PSNI.
- 25 August: The RIRA carried out a gun attack on the home of a former SDLP councillor, Pat Bradley, in Derry.
- 10 October: An inquest heard about the murder of Brendan "Speedy" Fegan in Newry, County Down in 1999. It is believed Fegan was killed by the RIRA as a result of his alleged drug dealing activities.
- 8 November: A PSNI officer was shot and wounded by the RIRA as he sat in his car on Bishop Street, Derry.
- 12 November: A PSNI officer was shot and wounded by the RIRA in Dungannon, County Tyrone.
- 16 December: The RIRA were blamed for a pipe bomb attack on a PSNI station in Strabane, County Tyrone.

== 2008 ==
- 7 February: The RIRA announced that after a three-year period of reorganisation it was ready to "go back to war".
- 14 February: A former RIRA member, Andrew Burns, was killed by a small republican organisation, Óglaigh na hÉireann in Doneyloop, County Donegal.
- 12 May: The RIRA exploded a booby-trap bomb underneath the car of a PSNI officer in Spamount, County Tyrone. The officer was pulled to safety by a passing motorist before the car was engulfed in flames.
- 9 September: The IMC blamed the RIRA for the discovery of an under vehicle explosive device under the car of a civilian in Lisburn, County Antrim. It is believed the RIRA had mistaken the civilian for a member of the PSNI.
- 15 September: The IMC blamed the RIRA for the discovery of a 100 lb bomb in Jonesborough, County Armagh.
- 25 September: A man survived after being shot in the neck by the RIRA on the County Londonderry-County Donegal border. The same man had been targeted in a pipe bomb attack on his home on 25 October, the RIRA did not claim responsibility for the attack, but security forces believe they were responsible for it.
- 19 November: The IMC blamed the RIRA for the discovery of a coffee jar bomb near a PSNI station in Belfast.

== 2009 ==
- 7 March: 2009 Massereene Barracks shooting - The RIRA shot dead two British Army soldiers (Patrick Azimkar and Mark Quinsey) as they collected a delivery outside Massereene Barracks in County Antrim. Two other soldiers and two civilian deliverymen were also wounded by gunfire. Brian Shivers was convicted of the murders and other charges at Antrim Crown Court in January 2012, but following an appeal was cleared of all charges at retrial in May 2013. John Paul Wootton and Brendan McConville were later convicted of the murders but have appealed.
- 2 April: The RIRA claimed responsibility for carrying out a punishment shooting in Derry against a convicted rapist who was awaiting sentencing for raping a 15-year-old girl.
- 5 July: Democratic Unionist Party (DUP) MP William McCrea was warned by police of a death threat from the RIRA.
- 13 July: The RIRA was blamed for shooting at the PSNI in the Ardoyne area of North Belfast during heavy rioting after an Orange Order parade.
- 28 August: Armed RIRA members staged a roadblock in Meigh, County Armagh. A PSNI patrol in an unmarked patrol vehicle spotted the group, but withdrew fearing that their presence would provoke a gun battle.
- 29 August: The IMC blamed the RIRA for the discovery of an improvised explosive near a school in Armagh town. The device was defused by the British Army.
- 5 September: The IMC blamed the RIRA for an attack on a man with iron bars and a sledge hammer in Strabane, County Tyrone.
- 17 September: The RIRA claimed responsibility for targeting an individual with an under vehicle explosive device in Belfast. It is believed the individual was employed by an engineering company with PSNI & Defence contracts.
- 21 September: The RIRA claimed responsibility for two pipe-bomb attacks on the homes of family members of a PSNI officer in Derry. One of the devices exploded and destroyed a car.
- 7 October: The IMC blamed the RIRA for a hoax bomb alert outside a courthouse in Newry, County Down. The alert caused massive disruption for both businesses and traffic in the city.
- 8 October: RIRA members fired a volley of shots over the coffin of RIRA member John Brady in Strabane, County Tyrone. Brady had died on 5 October in PSNI custody.
- 10 October: The IMC blamed the RIRA for a hoax bomb alert at a courthouse in Strabane, County Tyrone. Armed and masked men hijacked a taxi in the town, claiming they had left a device in the vehicle and then ordered the driver to abandon the vehicle outside the courthouse. The alert caused massive disruption.
- 22 October: The RIRA claimed responsibility for a small explosion at a British Territorial Army base in North Belfast which caused damage to the perimeter fence.
- 19 November: The IMC blamed the RIRA for the discovery of a "crude wire mortar type device" in Armagh town.
- 21 November: The IMC blamed the RIRA for an attempted assassination of a serving PSNI officer in Garrison, County Fermanagh. The operation was intercepted and a number of shots were exchanged between RIRA gunmen and police.
- 30 November: The IMC blamed the RIRA for failed pipe bomb attack on a PSNI station in Strabane, County Tyrone. The Device which failed to explode was defused by the British army.
- 31 December: The RIRA claimed responsibility for a gun attack on Crossmaglen PSNI station, County Armagh.

== 2010 ==
- 24 January: The RIRA claimed responsibility for a gun attack on Crossmaglen PSNI station, County Armagh.
- 25 January: The RIRA claimed responsibility for the shooting death of a man in Cork City in the Republic of Ireland. The RIRA claimed he was a drug dealer.
- 31 January: The RIRA claimed responsibility for a gun attack on a PSNI station in Bessbrook, County Armagh.
- 3 February: The RIRA claimed responsibility for throwing a pipe bomb at Oldpark PSNI station in Belfast. The device exploded causing damage to a perimeter fence of the station.
- 22 February: The RIRA were blamed for detonating a 250 lb car bomb outside a courthouse in Newry, County Down. The bombers issued a code-worded warning that the bomb would explode within 30 minutes, but it exploded 17 minutes later while police were evacuating the area. The courthouse guardhut was heavily damaged.
- 24 February: The RIRA claimed responsibility for kidnapping and shooting dead Kieran Doherty. His body was found on the outskirts of Derry, near the border with County Donegal; the RIRA said Doherty was a RIRA member who had been executed for drug dealing.
- 12 March: The PSNI claimed it had intelligence that Dale Moore, a Press Officer for Sinn Féin in Derry was under threat from the RIRA.
- 19 March: The RIRA claimed responsibility for security alerts in Derry. At least three controlled explosions were carried out on suspect devices which had been left in various locations around the city.
- 21 March: The RIRA were blamed for a gun attack on PSNI officers dealing with a "suspect device" on the Belfast–Dublin railway line near Newry, County Down. The device was found to be an "elaborate hoax".
- 28 March: Four masked and armed men, claiming to be RIRA volunteers, hijacked a van on Coshquin Road in Derry and left it outside "Blackthorn Amusements" in Bridgend, County Donegal. The hijacking sparked a security alert which caused disruption to traffic in the area.
- 22 April: The IMC blamed the RIRA for a car bomb attack on a PSNI base in Newtownhamilton, County Armagh. A telephoned warning was given an hour beforehand, but two civilians were hurt.
- 23 April: The IMC blamed the RIRA for a pipe bomb attack on a house in Coalisland, County Tyrone. It was claimed that the RIRA accused the occupants of being involved in drug-dealing and criminality.
- 30 May: The IMC blamed the RIRA for a pipe bomb attack on a house at Windmill Court, Dungannon, County Tyrone. The bomb was thrown through the kitchen window and caused considerable damage.
- 17 June: The IMC blamed the RIRA for an attempted van bomb attack on a PSNI station in Aughnacloy, County Tyrone. A telephoned warning was received and the 300 lb bomb was made safe by the British Army.
- 18 June: The IMC blamed the RIRA for an attempted pipe bomb attack on a PSNI station in Craigavon, County Armagh. The device was made safe by the British Army.
- 22 June: The IMC blamed the RIRA for an attempted ambush on the Keady–Castleblayney road in County Armagh. Security forces were lured into the area by a fire and a bomb warning. A bomb with a command wire was found and made safe by the British Army.
- 2 July: The IMC blamed the RIRA for a gun attack on a PSNI station in Crossmaglen, County Armagh.
- 10 July: The IMC blamed the RIRA for exploding a bomb under a small stone bridge on Carrickrovaddy Road near Belleeks, County Armagh.
- 26 July: The RIRA were blamed for a gun attack on the Players' Lounge pub on Fairview Strand, Dublin. A lone gunman entered the pub shortly after midnight and fired shots at a doorman. The doorman and two bystanders were wounded.
- 8 August: The IMC blamed the RIRA for planting a booby-trap bomb under a PSNI officer's car in Kilkeel, County Down. It fell off the car and failed to explode.
- 10 August: The IMC blamed the RIRA for planting a booby-trap bomb under a PSNI worker's car in Cookstown, County Tyrone. The man worked as a civilian security guard at Cookstown PSNI base. It partially exploded but the man was unhurt.
- 4 October: The RIRA claimed responsibility for exploding a car bomb outside the Ulster Bank on Culmore Road in Derry. The bomb was more than 200 lb and exploded at 23:56, about an hour after a telephoned warning. Two PSNI officers were lightly hurt and the bank, a hotel and nearby shops were heavily damaged.
- 20 October: The RIRA claimed responsibility for shooting a man in the legs in Derry. The man was a convicted sex offender.

== 2011 ==
- 18 January: The RIRA claimed responsibility for a blast bomb attack on the offices of UK City of Culture in Londonderry. The bomb caused minor damages to the offices.
- 16 February: The RIRA admitted responsibility for a viable pipe bomb device that was found outside a home in Magherafelt, County Londonderry.
- 3 March: The RIRA claimed responsibility for a gun attack on a police patrol in Derry. A number of shots were fired as police investigated a report of a stolen car. Although no one was injured, one shot did hit the police car.
- 2 April: PSNI officer Ronan Kerr was killed when a booby-trap bomb exploded under his car in Omagh, County Tyrone. A RIRA-linked group claimed responsibility.
- 17 May: The RIRA was blamed for planting a pipe bomb on a bus in Maynooth, near Dublin, during Queen Elizabeth II's visit to the Republic of Ireland.
- 22 May: The RIRA claimed responsibility for a bomb attack on a bank in Londonderry. No one was injured.
- 9 June: The RIRA was blamed for shooting dead a man in Dublin who was "until recently a leading member of the Continuity IRA" and allegedly linked to drug dealing.
- 24 August: The RIRA was blamed for a booby-trap bomb attack at a house in Navan, County Meath. The target was a man who had worked for the Garda as an informer inside the RIRA and he was wounded in the attack.
- 16 September: The RIRA was blamed for shooting dead alleged drug gang leader Michael "Micka" Kelly, in Clongriffin, north Dublin.
- 13 October: The RIRA claimed responsibility for planting a small bomb outside the UK City of Culture offices in Derry. It caused substantial damage to the office and surrounding buildings.

== 2012 ==
- 19 January: Bombs exploded outside two government offices in Londonderry. Telephoned warnings had been sent about an hour beforehand and the areas were evacuated. The RIRA was blamed.
- 26 July: It was announced that Republican Action Against Drugs (RAAD) and a number of small independent republican paramilitary groups were merging with the RIRA to form the New IRA
- 3 September: Real IRA member Alan Ryan was shot dead in Clongriffin, Dublin, possibly in retaliation for the shooting death of Michael "Micka" Kelly there. The Derry 32CSM website released a statement saying he was a republican anti-drug activist and vowed revenge. The RIRA held a paramilitary funeral for Ryan which was attended by masked men in military uniform who fired a volley of shots over the coffin.
- 28 September: John Wilson, from a well-known criminal family, was shot dead by the New IRA at his home in Cloverhill Road, Ballyfermot, County Dublin, purportedly in retaliation for the murder of Alan Ryan.
- 1 November: A Prison Officer, David Black, was shot dead on the M1 motorway near Craigavon while driving to work. The shots were fired from another car, which drove alongside. He was the first Prison Officer to be killed since 1993. The New IRA (which the now-defunct Real IRA is a founding faction) claimed responsibility.
- 4 December: The New IRA was blamed for the shooting death of Eamon "The Godfather" Kelly in north Dublin as retaliation for the murder of Alan Ryan earlier in the year.

== 2013 ==
- 23 February: Two alleged New IRA members in Cork were prevented from carrying out the assassination of a drug dealer after the van they were traveling in was stopped and searched by Gardaí, who discovered two loaded handguns and balaclavas.
- 3 March: The New IRA were blamed for an attempted mortar attack on a Derry police station. The PSNI stopped a van containing four mortars and the roof partly removed to allow the mortars to be fired. Two men were arrested at the scene, including the van driver and a motorcyclist following the van, while another man was arrested shortly after.
- 6 March: The New IRA were blamed for shooting Peter Butterly dead in Gormanston, County Meath allegedly retaliation for the killing of RIRA member Alan Ryan.
- 8 October: The New IRA shot Kevin Kearney dead in North Belfast, claiming he was a drug dealer. His body was found in a lake in Alexandra Park.
- 22 October: The New IRA claimed responsibility for throwing a pipe bomb at a PSNI vehicle in the Bogside area of Derry. The following night, another pipe bomb was thrown at a PSNI vehicle in Newtownabbey.
- 8 November: A booby-trap bomb was found under the car of a former RUC/PSNI officer in Tullycarnet, Belfast.
- 20 November: The New IRA claimed responsibility for an attempted proxy bombing in Derry. A masked gunman placed a bomb on a bus, which had no passengers, and told the driver to drive to Strand Road PSNI base. However, the driver abandoned the bus and the bomb was made safe.
- 5–6 December: A convoy of three PSNI vehicles was hit by automatic gunfire on Crumlin Road, Belfast. The attackers had fired from a makeshift platform on Herbert Street. The following night, a PSNI Land Rover was hit by gunfire on Suffolk Road.

== 2014 ==
- 11–13 February: The New IRA claimed responsibility for sending letter bombs to British Army recruitment offices in Oxford, Reading, Slough, Brighton, Aldershot, Canterbury and Chatham.
- 6–7 March: The New IRA claimed responsibility for sending two letter bombs to senior prison staff at Maghaberry Prison. It claimed that republican prisoners there were suffering degrading treatment. The letters were intercepted at sorting offices.
- 14 March: A PSNI Land Rover was hit by a horizontal mortar on Falls Road, Belfast. The mortar launcher was attached to railings at Belfast City Cemetery and detonated by command wire. A civilian car was also hit by debris, but there were no injuries. The RIRA claimed responsibility.
- 29 May: A large firebomb exploded in the reception of the Everglades Hotel in Derry, causing extensive damage. It had been left by a masked man who gave a forty-minute warning. The hotel had hosted a PSNI recruitment event and was due to host another.
- 30 July: A PSNI Land Rover was struck by gunfire in the Bogside area of Derry.
- 7 October: A pipe bomb was thrown at a PSNI mobile patrol on Crumlin Road, North Belfast. It failed to explode and was made safe by ATOs, who described it as highly sophisticated.
- 14–23 October: There were two attempts to kill PSNI officers with booby-trap bombs; one in the Ballyarnett area of Derry and another in the Ballycolman area of Strabane.
- 2 November: A PSNI armoured jeep was hit by a horizontal mortar in the Creggan area of Derry. A rear door was blown off and a passing car was damaged, but there were no injuries. The RIRA said it had fired an "EFP mortar-style device triggered by a command wire". In the security operation that followed, youths attacked the PSNI with stones and petrol bombs.
- 16 November: A PSNI armoured land rover was attacked with a homemade rocket-propelled grenade (RPG) launcher on Crumlin Road, North Belfast. A man appeared from the Ardoyne estate and fired the handheld launcher at the vehicle from 60 feet away. The warhead pierced the land rover's outer shell but bounced off heavier armour before exploding. The officers inside suffered shock but no injuries.

== 2015 ==
- 21 April: A bomb was thrown at a PSNI land rover in the New Lodge area of North Belfast. It exploded in mid-air, damaging a nearby car. The New IRA claimed responsibility.
- 27 April: A bomb exploded outside the offices of the Probation Board at Crawford Square in Derry, following a telephoned warning. The blast damaged the building and nearby vehicles. The New IRA claimed responsibility and said it also planted an "anti-personnel device" nearby, targeting members of the security forces.
- 18 June: The New IRA was blamed for planting a booby-trap bomb under the car of a married couple, both of whom are PSNI officers, in Eglinton. It was found and defused by the security forces.
- 26 November: A PSNI vehicle was riddled with automatic gunfire, fired from an AK-47, on Rossnareen Avenue, West Belfast. Several rounds shattered the bulletproof glass but failed to penetrate it. The New IRA claimed responsibility.
- 25 December: The group fired shots at police in north Belfast.

== 2016 ==
- Early March: The group declared that all criminals were legitimate targets after member, Vincent Ryan, was shot dead. They called the killing "a declaration of war".
- 4 March: A prison officer (Adrian Ismay) died from a heart attack in a hospital on 4 March 2016. He had received serious wounds following a booby-trap bomb detonated under his van on Hillsborough Drive, East Belfast 11 days earlier. The wounds he received from the bombing were directly responsible for the heart attack that killed him. The 'New' IRA claimed responsibility and said it was a response to the alleged mistreatment of republican prisoners at Maghaberry Prison. It added that the officer was targeted because he trained prison officers at Maghaberry. Christopher Robinson of Dunmurry was charged.
- April: Explosives linked to the New IRA were found in Dublin and several people were questioned by police. Michael McGibbon was shot three times in the leg in a "punishment shooting". He later died from his injuries. The New IRA stated that the intention was not to kill him.
- 11 May: The terrorist threat level in Great Britain was raised to "substantial" by Home Secretary Theresa May and MI5 because of the threat posed by the group.
- June: A five-man New IRA hit team were in Dublin's north inner city looking for two leading gangsters after one of their associates was shot dead in a gangland feud. Sources said the squad from the North spent several days and nights looking for their targets.
- 7 December: In Cork City at 5pm former leader of the RIRA southern command, Aidan "The Beast" O'Driscoll, was shot and killed in the street by two masked gunmen. O'Driscoll had been shot in the leg in June 2013 in what the New IRA claimed was a punishment-style shooting for "unrepublican conduct" before he had stepped-down from command in 2012.

== 2017 ==
- 23 January: The New IRA attempted to kill a police officer in north Belfast using an AK-47. He was hit multiple times in the arm at a petrol station on Crumlin road, Ardoyne.
- 22 February: A bomb exploded in the driveway of a PSNI officer's home as a bomb squad was trying to make it safe. The bomb was thought to have fallen off the officer's vehicle. Nobody was injured.
- 21 March: A roadside bomb exploded as an armoured PSNI vehicle passed in Strabane. There were no injuries but the PSNI claimed the police officers were very lucky to escape. The New IRA claimed responsibility for the attack.
- 22 April: A bomb was left outside the gates of a school, in Belfast, after the bomber(s) suspected they were being watched. The New IRA is suspected.
- 2 June: The Gardaí Síochána found 6 kg (13.2 lb) of Semtex in Dublin city believed to belong to the group. Two men were arrested.

== 2018 ==
- 20 July: The New IRA claimed responsibility for gun and bomb attacks at police during the riots in Derry.

== 2019 ==
- 19 January: The group bombed a courthouse in Derry.
- 20 January: A van was hijacked by masked men in Derry, a package was placed into the back and the driver was instructed to park the vehicle in the city centre. The van was later abandoned in a housing estate and homes were evacuated. In a separate incident in the city a Royal Mail van was stolen and abandoned. Authorities blamed the incidents on the New IRA.
- 5 March: At around 12:00 pm three explosive devices were found in packages that were found in Jiffy bags at Waterloo station and City Airport in London as well as a separate package found nearby Heathrow Airport. It is suspected that the New IRA is behind the attack because of several postage stamps on all of the packages that can be traced to Irish post offices. MI5 warned that the possibility of Republicans being behind the suspicious packages as "possible." On 12 March 2019, it was reported that a group stylising themselves as the IRA claimed to be behind the explosive devices.
- 18 April: Rioting in Creggan, Derry, resulting in journalist Lyra McKee being shot dead. The PSNI named the New IRA as "likely" perpetrators of both the rioting and the shooting.
- 8 June: The "New IRA" claimed responsibility for placing a bomb under a police officer's car at Shandon Park Golf Club in east Belfast. The bomb was defused and did not cause damage or injuries.
- 7–10 September: An improvised explosive device, placed by the New IRA, is found and defused in Creggan, Derry, designed to kill and maim Police Service of Northern Ireland officers. The day prior, on 9 September 2019, rioting in Creggan broke out, following targeted raids against dissident republicans after a mortar bomb was found in Strabane, County Tyrone on 7 September 2019.

== 2021 ==
- 19 April: An improvised explosive device was discovered behind the vehicle of a female PSNI officer in Dungiven, the officer's three-year-old daughter was also present. The Army made the device safe, with the blame being placed on the New IRA. The group admitted responsibility days later.

== 2022 ==
- 17 February: The New IRA admitted responsibility for shooting a teenager in the legs in Strabane the week before.
- 18 November: The New IRA admitted responsibility for a mortar attack on a police vehicle the day prior in Strabane. During which 2 were lightly injured, AK 47s were present during the attack.

== 2023 ==
- 27 February: Police considered likely that the New IRA was involved in the shooting of John Caldwell.
- 9 April: Police foil a bomb plot that was aimed to disrupt US President Joe Biden's visit to Belfast on 12 April, to mark the 25th Anniversary of the Good Friday Agreement.

== 2024 ==
- 22 May: PSNI arrested two men in Derry and seized an AK-47 variant assault rifle.

== 2026 ==
- 3 April: A pizza delivery driver was forced at gunpoint to deliver an explosive to a police station in Lurgan. The New IRA claimed responsibility for the operation.
- 25 April: A car was hijacked and later exploded outside of a PSNI station in Dunmurry, with police suspecting the New IRA due to the similarity to the attack earlier in the month. They claimed responsibility days later and announced the homes of police officers are potential targets.
- 21 July: A car being driven by a woman in her 20s and a male passenger in his 40s was stopped by Gardai near Carrickmacross and discovered to contain an 'extremely significant' bomb. The car was intended to be driven across the border, with the New IRA allegedly being responsible.

== See also ==
- Timeline of the Northern Ireland Troubles and peace process
