= 2001 London bombing =

2001 London bombing may refer to:

- 2001 BBC bombing
- 2001 Ealing bombing
- May 2001 Hendon post office bomb
