= Slovak Three =

Members of the Real IRA arrested in Slovakia in 2001

The Slovak Three (Note: The moniker "Slovak Three" was originally bestowed upon the men by the Irish Republican Prisoners' Welfare Association, a support group for imprisoned RIRA men and their families.) were Irishmen Michael Christopher McDonald, Declan John Rafferty and Fintan Paul O'Farrell, who were members of the Real IRA. They were arrested in a sting operation in Slovakia conducted by British security agency MI5 in 2001 after they were caught attempting to buy arms for their campaign. They believed they were purchasing weapons from Iraqi intelligence agents and that Saddam Hussein was to play a role in the Real IRA similar to the one Colonel Gaddafi had in its predecessors the Provisional IRA. The three men met in Piešťany, a spa town in Western Slovakia, after months of meetings and telephone calls—all of which were intercepted and overheard by MI6. Believing its case to be now fireproof, MI5 had passed details of the men and their intentions to the Slovak authorities, who ambushed the men on the evening of 5 July 2001 after their meeting. They were arrested and imprisoned in the expectation Slovakia would receive a formal extradition request from the UK.

McDonald, Rafferty and O'Farrell were extradited; at Woolwich Crown Court, London, they were tried and sentenced to 30 years imprisonment. Unusually for IRA men in British courts, they pleaded guilty. In 2006 they were transferred to Ireland to serve the remainder of their sentences in Portlaoise Prison. In 2014, however, it was discovered that some prisoners who had been transferred from the English penal system to the Irish one had not had their warrants adjusted to take into account Ireland's lack of any facility to release prisoners on licence. This resulted in anomalies between the lengths of their original sentences and what they were expected to serve in Ireland; after an appeal, the Irish High Court released McDonald, Rafferty and O'Farrell in September 2014.

== Background ==
In July 1997 the Provisional IRA, which had been waging an armed campaign against the British government for the previous 30 years, called a ceasefire. Subsequently, at an IRA Convention in County Donegal, the organisation's Quartermaster and Executive member Michael McKevitt denounced the ceasefire and the fledgling Northern Ireland peace process, urging a return to the armed struggle. He was outmanoeuvred and isolated by the Gerry Adams-Martin McGuinness leadership and, along with his supporters, resigned. In November that year, McKevitt and his supporters formed a new group named the Real IRA, which attracted disaffected Irish republicans on both sides of the border.

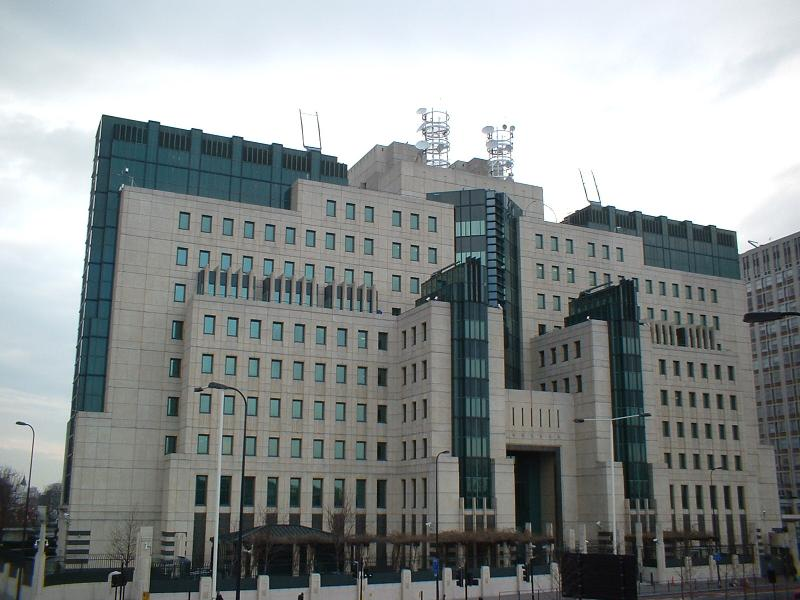
MI6 headquarters in Vauxhall. The rear of the building had been attacked by the Real IRA in September 2001; O'Farrell and Rafferty later claimed to have been part of the team carrying out the operation.

McKevitt, as Quartermaster, had access to the IRA's major arms dumps; when he left he took with him a small amount of materiel, including Semtex, weapons including Uzi submachine guns, AK-47 and AK-74, and detonators and timing devices. Within a few years, the group was able to supplement its equipment with imported arms and explosives, much of which came from the former Yugoslavia, which at the time had a flourishing black market in weaponry following the Yugoslav Wars of the previous decade. The group was not always successful: in July 2000 in Dobranje, the Croatian police seized a large quantity of weapons destined for Dublin. By the following year, a number of RIRA arms dumps in Ireland had been discovered; most of the seized weapons came from Eastern Europe. Ulster loyalist groups also obtained arms from the same region, but by 2001 the national governments of that region were attempting to stem the practice as part of the process of joining the European Union. (Note: Terrorism itself, for example, was not made illegal in Slovakia until after the 11 September attacks, and a Slovak government agent commented anonymously that "the world looks very negatively on the fact that our arms traders falsify licenses and end-user certificates and are supplying global terrorists with weapons and systems" and that Slovakia was "a high-risk country from the viewpoint of trading in arms". Czechoslovakia was one of the busiest weapons producers of the Warsaw Pact; the fall of communism led to weapons factories closing. Those that continued to produce weapons paid wages sufficiently low to make staff susceptible to bribery. The Slovak Spectator reported that within a few years, military production had declined by 90% and 50,000-60,000 people previously employed in the arms-manufacturing industry had lost their jobs.) The RIRA wished to receive the sponsorship of a rogue state and believed that with Saddam Hussein's Iraq they would receive both guns and money for their cause and create a supply line for the future. (Note: This was an attempt to have a similar source of weapons and money that the Provisionals had found in Colonel Gaddafi's Libya. Gaddafi had, however, by now entered into a "cautious rapprochement with the West".) The previous year, the group had carried out some high-profile attacks in England, bombing BBC Television Centre in White City in March, Hammersmith Bridge in June 2000, and Ealing Broadway in August, In September the same year they launched a rocket-propelled grenade attack on the MI6 headquarters in Vauxhall; the RPG-22 used in the attack may have been purchased in the Balkans.

MI5 chose the Iraqi ruse for their sting in the belief it "might prove alluring". The so-called political wing of the RIRA, the 32 County Sovereignty Movement (32CSM), had recently published articles on their website condemning Britain for bombing Iraq in 1998. The fake Iraqi gunrunners first established contact with the republicans through the 32CSM's press officer Joe Dillon, reported The Daily Telegraph. At first they claimed to be Iraqi journalists who were merely interested in the Real IRA and British imperialism; they left a mobile telephone on which they could be contacted. They later claimed to be Iraqi intelligence personnel.

=== O'Farrell, Rafferty and McDonald ===
O'Farrell, Rafferty and McDonald were all from the Cooley Peninsula in County Louth: O'Farrell and Rafferty hailed from Carlingford and McDonald was from Dundalk. Their IRA activities were known to the Gardai. An old friendship existed between the three and between their families, and it was later suggested in court that they may have been inspired as much by loyalties to each other as by politics. McDonald had a reputation for using violence and was suspected by the Gardaí of at least one killing. He may have been the RIRA second-in-command to McKevitt in Ireland, and also led the team in Slovakia. At their trial, all three were described as being "leading figures" in the organisation. O'Farrell and Rafferty were 35 and 41 years of age, respectively, when they were arrested.

== Operation Samnite ==
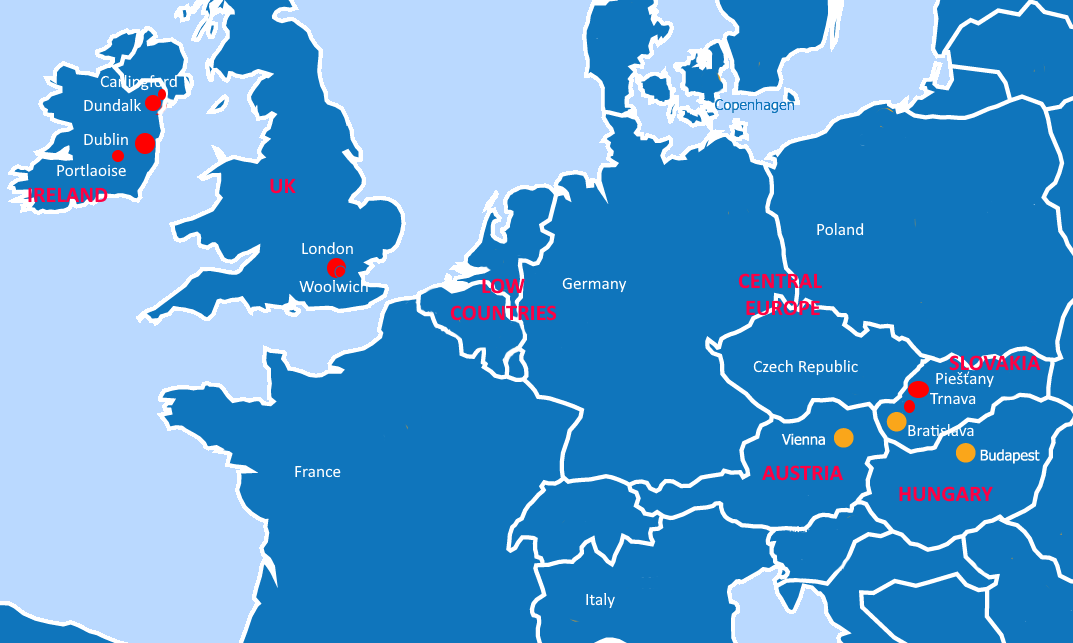
Geography of Operation Samnite

The Real IRA's plans for the continent were discovered in 2000 by Slovak intelligence, which informed MI5. The British operation, called Operation Samnite, took six months to come to fruition the following year and involved up to 50 members of MI5. The RIRA had "an extensive shopping list" of weaponry it wished to acquire. Having agreed to meet a man named Sami who they thought was an Iraqi agent, another Louth man—and close associate of McKevitt—made the first trip to Slovakia. He was under surveillance from the beginning. The Irishmen believed they were negotiating with Iraqi intelligence agents sent by Saddam Hussein, from whom they believed they were buying 5,000 kilograms (11,000 lb) of semtex plastic explosive, 2,000 detonators, 200 grenades and 500 pistols. (Note: For context, reported a Slovak news agency, the usual amount of semtex required for a car bomb was around 1.5 kilograms (3.3 lb).) McDonald may have hoped to obtain a variety of supergun that the Iraqi government was suspected to possess; such a weapon combined with wire-guided missiles—also requested by McDonald—would have enabled the Real IRA to have pierced everything from armour plating to the bulletproof vests worn by the Police Service of Northern Ireland (PSNI) and the British army.

Following the purchase, the Iraqis intended to make two shipments to Ireland overland through Central Europe and the Low Countries. The first shipment was to consist of 2,000 kilograms (4,400 lb) of plastic explosives, 100 grenades, 125 pistols and 125 automatic weapons. The remainder would be sent in another shipment.

=== The sting ===
Five meetings between the RIRA team and the supposed gunrunners took place in Dublin, Austria and Budapest; at these meetings the parties established a working relationship. Telephone calls between the United Kingdom, the Republic of Ireland, Austria and Hungary were intercepted and the meetings were monitored with bugging devices. The Daily Telegraph later reported that O'Farrell and Rafferty told the agents they had been part of the team that had attacked MI6's headquarters the previous year. Rafferty stated the organisation was held back by its "lack of funds and hardware", telling the agents, "[h]ad we got the proper tools we would have done something more, more worse than that", referring to the RPG attack. McDonald suggested they "could do better with more advanced kit", telling the agents their use of it would "bring a smile to your face".

A tactic often favoured by the authorities is the sting operation, in which aspiring terrorists are unwittingly given the space by a person they trust to incriminate themselves in tightly controlled circumstances, such as an arms deal or a planned attack.

— Richard Barrett and Tom Parker, 2018

Two MI5 agents of Middle Eastern appearance arranged to meet the trio in an Arab restaurant in Piešťany, western Slovakia, a spa town that had had a large Arabian community since the 1970s. (Note: The Slovak Spectator described Piešťany thus: "The spa town of Piešťany has long been a European health retreat for wealthy Arabs. Under the former communist regime, middle-east oil magnates and sheikhs would come to the town for its special health centres and natural springs. An Arab influence has remained in the town, and hotels in Piešťany receive Arab TV stations, including TV Kuwait.") The Guardian noted it is popular with wealthy Arabs and with ex-KGB arms dealers. Afraid of being overheard, the Irishmen presented their list of requests to the MI5 men written on a restaurant napkin. McDonald did not intend to let the agents keep the list but one of them forestalled his attempts to retrieve it by taking it from the table, pretending to blow his nose on it and subsequently pocketing the napkin.

Warrants had been issued under the Prevention of Terrorism Act, reported The Daily Telegraph, "relating to the illegal membership of a proscribed organisation, entering into arrangements for the purposes of terrorism, fundraising for the purposes of terrorism and conspiracy charges". The three Irishmen were arrested on Thursday 5 July 2001 by Slovak police, implementing the British warrants and in expectation of an extradition request; the UK has an extradition treaty with Slovakia. The chief of Slovak Interpol compared the arrests to a scene "just like you see in films", because Slovak commandos had set up roadblocks that they used to force the Irishmen's car off the road and ambush them. "All three were taken down in a matter of seconds", he said.

Slovak Chief Prosecutor Milan Hanzel did not acknowledge the men were IRA militants for a week. Following questioning in Bratislava, they were imprisoned in Trnava on an international arrest warrant. Their names were not publicly released for more than a week. While in Slovak custody, according to El Mundo, the three men confessed to having met with Osama bin Laden's European finance manager Hamid Aich. (Note: According to The Slovak Spectator, Aich, who lived in Dublin at the time, had founded the Agency for Mercy and Sympathy, which security services suspected of being the financial hub of 22 global terrorist organisations.) According to The Slovak Spectator, they received from him a large amount of money that was "to be deposited in banks in Santander, Bilbao and Vitori, likely to be used by the Spanish terrorist organisation ETA". Interior Minister Ivan Šimko denied any knowledge of the possibility but said that even if he did know he would not have answered.

== Extradition ==
Slovakia agreed to extradite the three suspects to England in August 2001, although only after a lengthy legal dispute. The men's Slovak lawyer Jan Gereg argued that their rights had been violated while in Slovak custody. The legal team argued there had been insufficient time for the court to reach an independent decision on the extradition request and that the court which examined the request was too minor to make such a decision. Gereg said, ""Even when you're dealing with the worst kind of terrorist, you have to keep to at least the basic principles of law". Their solicitors also claimed MI5 had illegally used covert surveillance devices including bugs and hidden cameras. The Slovak court denied their appeal and allowed the extraditions to go ahead; Alica Klimesova, a justice ministry spokesperson, stated; "the court ruled that the extradition of the three is legally acceptable, and now only the minister will decide". The men were flown to London on 30 August 2001.

On arrival in the UK, the three were held at a "central London police station" and in November they appeared for arraignment at the Old Bailey's Number Two Court under an armed guard. Their trial was set for April 2002 and was expected to last between six and eight weeks. While in police custody, the three men confessed to attempting to purchase arms for use in terrorist attacks. Gardaí searched their homes in Dundalk but did not arrest anyone as a result.

=== Reactions ===
The 32CSM accused those involved in the peace process of having a "sinister agenda" regarding other republicans and announced a campaign to secure the three men's immediate release. Ulster Unionist Party leader David Trimble welcomed the arrests, saying it could indicate the start of a period of increased cooperation between the UK and Eastern Europe. Trimble also stated; "there has been a delay or a reluctance in the past by the Irish authorities to move against" dissident republicans. The Slovak government said in the wake of the joint operation, "if we ever had such a reputation [for gunrunning] such events [the arrest of the Irishmen] help to make that a thing of the past".

=== Sentencing and imprisonment ===
"The men are accused of membership of a proscribed organisation, fundraising for a terrorist organisation, seeking to enter arrangements for the purpose of terrorism and conspiracy charges."

— Kathy Donaghy and Clodagh Sheehy, 2001

McDonald, Rafferty and O'Farrell stood trial at Woolwich Crown Court, London, in May 2002. They were not expected to plead; when on trial in British courts, Irish republicans usually refuse to recognise the court's jurisdiction and ignore the proceedings. On this occasion, however, the defendants pleaded guilty—possibly the first time this had happened in the course of The Troubles. (Note: A side-effect of the trio's guilty pleas was that a covert tape recording of Michael McKevitt in conversation that was due to be played to the court was never heard, and would not be until McKevitt himself was on trial for directing acts of terrorism the following year.) Rafferty's counsel called it a momentous occasion and said he urged the judge on their behalf to sentence the men as soon as possible because they were "extremely anxious now to know their fate". The judge acknowledged that there may have been "pressures upon you coming from the accident of where you lived and loyalty to those you know", but said this was outweighed by the severity of their intended actions. The three men pleaded guilty to various charges under the Terrorism Act 2000 and conspiracy to cause explosions. They also said they had been planning to bomb either Ireland or London on their successful return. Friends and relatives of the accused were in the public gallery. On 7 May, the defendants were each sentenced to 30 years' imprisonment. The 32CSM said it was "shocked by the length of the sentence, considering the three men had changed their pleas to guilty just before the trial was due to start".

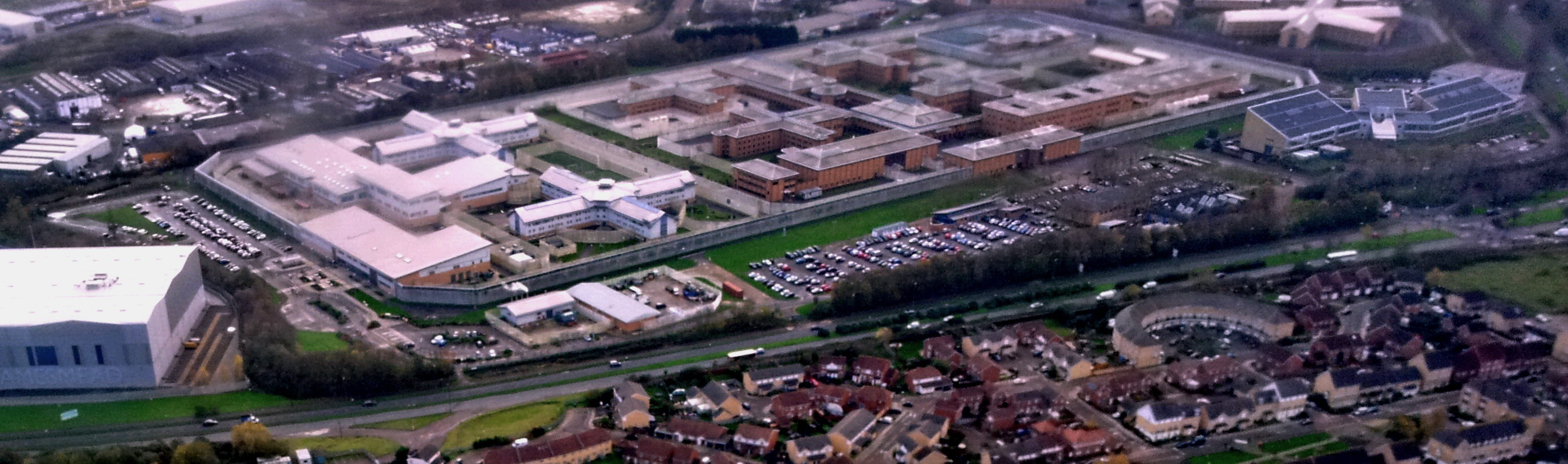
Aerial view of Belmarsh Prison in Woolwich, where the men were incarcerated until their transfer

While serving their sentences in England they were held in HM Prison Belmarsh; the Irish Republican Prisoners' Welfare Association (IRPWA) protested the conditions in which they said the men were being held. The IRPWA said the men were "confined to their cells for 26 hours at a time they are not allowed any exercise periods, use of the gym is also proscribed—as are visits to the prison shop and library. As a result, all three men are suffering physically with serious weight-loss".

The three men appealed against their sentences in July 2005. Julian Knowles, one of their solicitors, accused the British government of "bypass[ing] fundamental legal principles" to secure their extradition from Slovakia and that their extradition had been illegal. Another counsel, Ben Emmerson, described the original sentences as "manifestly excessive" because the trio were only "foot soldiers". Emmerson also reminded the court that in Ireland, Michael McKevitt had recently been convicted of leading the Real IRA but was only sentenced to 20 years. Although Emmerson did not accuse MI5 of entrapment, he said it was a "ruse conducted in the public interest", and called the prosecution of the Slovak Three an "abuse of process". News outlets at the time said the appeal, if it had succeeded, could have impacted the ability of MI5 to perform similar sting operations in the future. The Court of Appeal did not overturn the convictions but reduced all three men's sentences by two years on account of their original guilty pleas. According to Lord Justice Hooper, the court reduced the sentences "not without some reluctance". In 2006, under the Transfer of Sentenced Persons Acts, McDonald, Rafferty and O'Farrell were transferred to Portlaoise Prison in County Laois to complete their sentences in Ireland.

== Aftermath ==
Operation Samnite was the first operation by MI5—officially a domestic intelligence service—to be based solely on evidence gathered abroad. It has since been described as an illustration of the advantages of close cooperation between national security agencies. It was also said to be in stark contrast to previous operations MI5 had attempted, some of which have been described as "too cavalier" in their approach.

=== Release ===
In July 2014, the three men instructed their solicitors to challenge the legality of their sentencing and continued detention. (Note: This followed what was called the Sweeney case—officially Sweeney v. Governor of Loughan House Open Centre IESC 42—in 2015. Irishman Vincent Sweeney had received 16 years imprisonment in Britain in 2006 and was transferred to Ireland two years later. He then challenged the grounds of his continued imprisonment in Ireland, claiming he should be released. Although his appeal to the High Court failed, his subsequent appeal to the Supreme Court succeeded and he was released the same day. Sweeney's case set the precedent for the Slovak Three's successful appeal, because "Judge Hogan "appl[ied] the principles identified in Sweeney".) In September that year, Judge Gerard Hogan ordered the immediate release of O'Farrell, Rafferty and McDonald, declaring that "the High Court had no jurisdiction to retrospectively adapt, so as to achieve compatibility with Irish law, the defective warrants under which the three were detained here following their transfer from English prisons in 2006".

McDonald, Rafferty and O'Farrell were freed within hours of his announcement on the evening of 11 September 2014, having served 12 years of their 28-year sentence. Their relatives were in court to hear the proceedings.The State appealed both the decision and the men's immediate release in an attempt to keep them imprisoned until October 2016. The appeal was held that year. The Supreme Court of Ireland upheld Hogan's ruling by a majority of 4:3. (Note: In the majority were Justices William McKechnie, John MacMenamin, Mary Laffoy, Iseult O'Malley; supporting the State's appeal were the Chief Justice Susan Denham, Frank Clarke and Donal O'Donnell.) Although the judgment noted that it was a "troubling case", and said "many would say, having committed these very serious crimes" the three should be made to serve every year of their sentences, the procedure by which they had had their sentences transferred had been "fundamentally defective" and incompatible with Irish law as it then stood. It concluded the warrants were void ab initio and stated the legal deficiencies were beyond mend either by the law as it stood or by the Irish courts. The disputing judges had disagreed on the last point, believing it was legally possible to adjust the warrants after the fact; the judgment placed responsibility for resolving potential disparity with the sentencing guidelines of another state with the sentencing state—in this case England. The fundamental discrepancy was that under English law, any prisoner serving a custodial sentence of between one and 50 years automatically qualifies for release after serving two-thirds of the sentence. Irish law only allows for 25% remission and no release on licence. As such, the trio would have been liable to release after 18 years if they had remained in England. Further, the warrants themselves recorded an incorrect sentence (28 rather than 30 years) and the sentence itself did not exist in Irish sentencing guidelines; conspiracy, while in England carrying a maximum penalty of life imprisonment, has a maximum term of 20 years in Ireland.

As a result of the disparity revealed by the 2016 appeal decision, the Irish government ceased processing application requests from Irish prisoners in foreign prisons. In April 2018, the Justice Minister Charlie Flanagan confirmed there were 36 outstanding requests awaiting consideration and that another five prisoners had been released. Flanagan confirmed the High Court's ruling was directly responsible for the delay, saying all such future releases were "on hold" while the implications of the release of McDonald, O'Farrell and Rafferty were considered and the possibility of adjusting the law was weighed. The Irish Council for Prisoners Overseas, however, said this left prisoners in a legal "limbo".

== See also ==
- Anti-terrorism legislation in the UK
- Continuity IRA
- New IRA
