= Birmingham bombing =

Birmingham bombing may refer to:

- 16th Street Baptist Church bombing in Birmingham, Alabama, USA, 1963, by the Ku Klux Klan
- Birmingham pub bombings, England, 1974, by the Provisional IRA
- 2001 Birmingham bombing, England, by the Real IRA
