= 1998 Banbridge bombing =

Real IRA car bombing in Northern Ireland

- Part of the Troubles
- Banbridge (Northern Ireland)
- Location: Banbridge, Northern Ireland
- Date: 1 August 1998 (UTC)
- Target: Unionist owned businesses
- Attack type: Car bomb
- Deaths: 0
- Injuries: 35
- Perpetrator: Real IRA

The 1998 Banbridge bombing was the explosion of a car bomb in the town of Banbridge in County Down, Northern Ireland on 1 August 1998. Thirty-three civilians and two Royal Ulster Constabulary (RUC) officers were injured in the attack in a busy shopping street that was later claimed by the Real Irish Republican Army (RIRA), a dissident Irish republican group.

The bomb containing 500 lb (230 kg) of explosives was inside a red Vauxhall Cavalier parked on Newry Street. A 20-minute telephone warning was given allowing the police to clear the town centre and potentially avoiding many fatalities, although the warning was "inadequate" and still led to many injuries. The bomb severely damaged the heart of the town and shops in the area, causing an estimated £3.5 million of damage.

After the bombing, local residents, paramedics, and emergency services worked tirelessly to help the injured and clear the debris.

At the time it was the most damaging bomb attack since the signing of the Good Friday Agreement in April. Two weeks later, the Real IRA would carry out the Omagh bombing. Shortly afterwards, they had a ceasefire.

The town was targeted previously that year by the Continuity IRA in an attempted car bomb on 6 January 1998, which was safely defused after a warning. Major bombings also had occurred there in 1991 and 1982.

== See also ==
- Timeline of Real Irish Republican Army actions
