= Killing of David Black =

2012 killing in Northern Ireland

- Part of Dissident Irish Republican campaign
- Location: M1 motorway, County Armagh, Northern Ireland
- Date: 1 November 2012; 7:30 am
- Target: David Black
- Attack type: Shooting
- Deaths: 1
- Perpetrator: New IRA

On 1 November 2012, David Black, a 52‑year‑old prison officer from Cookstown, County Tyrone, was shot dead while driving to Maghaberry Prison along the M1 motorway between Portadown and Lurgan. Gunmen in a Toyota Camry opened fire on his car, causing it to leave the road and come to rest in a ditch.

Black was the 30th member of the Northern Ireland Prison Service to be killed since 1974, and the first since the murder of Jim Peacock in 1993. The killing prompted widespread political condemnation. In the years that followed, a prosecution related to the attack collapsed, and on the 10th anniversary of his death his widow issued a renewed appeal for information.

== Background ==
David Black, born in August 1960, lived in Cookstown, County Tyrone. He spent more than 30 years in the Northern Ireland Prison Service and was serving at Maghaberry Prison when he was killed. He left school at 16 and was employed in a local bacon‑processing plant before joining the Prison Service. Alongside his work, he also ran the family farm and managed rental properties. He was married, had two children, and was a member of the Orange Order.

== Attack ==
On 1 November 2012, Black was shot while driving from his home in Cookstown to Maghaberry Prison. At about 7:30 am, as he travelled along the M1 motorway between Portadown (Junction 11) and Lurgan (Junction 10), a dark blue Toyota Camry with Dublin registration plates drew alongside his black Audi A4 and shots were fired at him. His car left the motorway and came to rest in a ditch. The Camry, which had been seen in the Lurgan area the previous evening, was found burnt out in the Inglewood area of the town roughly 10 minutes after the shooting. Black was the 30th member of the Northern Ireland Prison Service to be killed since 1974. The previous prison officer to die in such circumstances was Jim Peacock, who was murdered on 1 September 1993.

== Funeral ==
Black's funeral took place on 6 November at Molesworth Presbyterian Church in Cookstown. A private service was held at the family home beforehand, followed by a private burial at Kildress Parish Church. Prison Service staff formed an honour guard for the cortege, and representatives from political and civic bodies in both Northern Ireland and the Republic of Ireland attended the church service. Police carried out security checks in the area in advance. A Sinn Féin source stated that the deputy first minister had been prepared to attend, but the family asked that no Sinn Féin representatives be present.

At the same time, the Irish Congress of Trade Unions held a separate event at Belfast City Hall, attended by several hundred people.

== Reactions ==
Prime Minister of the United Kingdom David Cameron said it was "a dreadful tragedy". PSNI Chief Constable Matt Baggott described it as "a completely senseless attack". Tánaiste Eamon Gilmore expressed "revulsion at this act" and stated that “there will be no return to the dark and violent days of the past”.

== Aftermath ==
In 2018, the trial of a man accused of aiding and abetting Black's murder collapsed. In November 2022, marking the 10th anniversary of the killing, Black's widow issued a renewed appeal for information about those responsible.
