= 2001 Birmingham bombing =

Bomb attack in England

- Part of the Dissident Irish Republican campaign
- Location: Birmingham, United Kingdom
- Date: 3 November 2001; 22:39 – (GMT)
- Attack type: Attempted car bomb
- Deaths: 0
- Injuries: 0
- Perpetrator: Real IRA

A car bomb attack on the city centre of Birmingham took place on 3 November 2001.

== History ==
There was a partial detonation of a car bomb in the city centre of Birmingham on Saturday 3 November 2001. The Real Irish Republican Army (RIRA), a dissident Irish Republican terror group, was responsible. The RIRA gave a telephone warning before the device exploded outside a busy nightclub on Smallbrook Queensway, near the corner with Hurst Street and 250m south of New Street station – just 135 metres (443 ft) from the location of the Birmingham pub bombings in 1974. The bomb was similar in size to those used in the BBC bombing and Ealing bombing that year, but only the detonator exploded, leaving 30 kilograms (66 lb) of home-made explosives intact.

An officer from the West Midlands Police said the bomb, if fully detonated, could have caused a "very serious loss of life" on the busy road. The timing and location of the bombing (10:39 PM on a Saturday night outside a busy nightclub) were likely chosen to maximize damage to the public.

The attack came during a tense period of the Northern Ireland peace process.

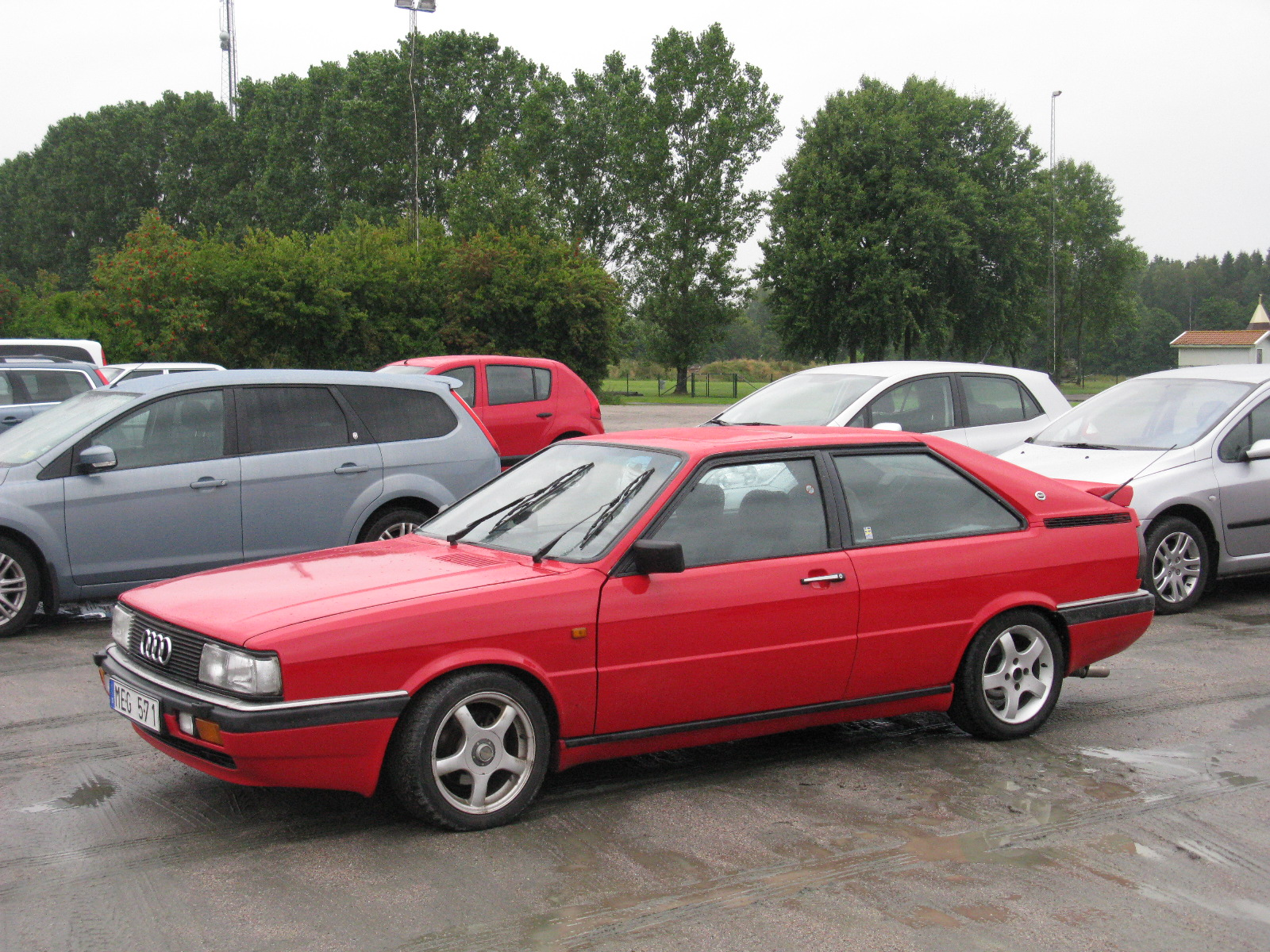
An Audi Coupé similar to the one carrying the bomb

== Convictions ==
In November 2001, three men – Noel Maguire, Robert Hulme and his brother Aiden Hulme – were arrested in connection with the bomb attacks in Birmingham and London that year. They were all later convicted at the Old Bailey on 8 April 2003. Robert and Aiden Hulme were each jailed for 20 years. Noel Maguire, who the judge said played "a major part in the bombing conspiracy", was sentenced to 22 years. Two other men, James McCormack, of County Louth, and John Hannan, of Newtownbutler, County Fermanagh, had already admitted the charge at an earlier hearing. McCormack, who played the most serious part of the five, the judge said, was jailed for twenty-two years. John Hannan, who was seventeen at the time of the incidents, was given sixteen years detention. All had links to the Real IRA stronghold of Dundalk in the Republic of Ireland.

== See also ==
- 2000 MI6 attack
- 2001 Ealing bombing
- 2001 BBC bombing
- Birmingham pub bombings
- 2007 London car bombs
- Chronology of the Northern Ireland Troubles
