= 2018 Derry riots =

2018 riots in Derry, Northern Ireland

- Date: 8 July 2018 – 13 July 2018
- Location: Derry, Northern Ireland
- Methods: Rioting

Parties
| Republican Protestors; New IRA | Police Service of Northern Ireland |

The 2018 Derry riots were riots and civil disturbances taking place in Derry, Northern Ireland from 8 July 2018, before the Protestant Orange Order parade. It was the first 12 July parade to take place in Derry for five years. Violence broke out in the republican Bogside area in what has been called the worst in the city in "decades". The Police Service of Northern Ireland (PSNI) has blamed the New IRA group for trying to kill police officers. Riot police fired plastic baton rounds, whilst at least 70 petrol bombs have been thrown at them.

The riots have been condemned by senior leaders, including Sinn Féin leader Mary Lou McDonald who attended a "not in my name" rally. An Ulster Unionist Party MLA has claimed that the republican rioters are "using children" to blame the PSNI for the violence.

Violence linked to the riots overspilled in other parts of Northern Ireland. On 13 July, the house of Gerry Adams in west Belfast was attacked with a home-made bomb. Adams survived injury and claimed that his two grandchildren were standing at the doorway only ten minutes before the blast at 10:50 pm. The house of another republican in Belfast, Bobby Storey, was also attacked the same day. However, no casualties were reported in either of the attacks.

On 20 July, the New IRA claimed responsibility for gun and bomb attacks at police during the disturbances in Derry.

== See also ==
- 1996 Derry riots
- Belfast City Hall flag protests
