= Republican Action Against Drugs =

Irish republican vigilante group

Republican Action Against Drugs (RAAD) was an Irish republican vigilante group active mainly in Derry and the surrounding area, including parts of County Londonderry and County Tyrone in Northern Ireland, and parts of County Donegal in the Republic of Ireland. It targeted those who it claimed were drug dealers. The group's methods included shooting the alleged dealers in the arms and legs ("punishment shootings"); pipe bomb or arson attacks on the property of alleged dealers; and warning, threatening or banishing the alleged dealers.

In July 2012, it was announced that RAAD was merging with the Real Irish Republican Army and other independent republican paramilitary groups to form what is referred to as the New IRA.

== History ==
RAAD graffiti in the Bogside area of Derry

The group formed in late 2008. It frequently issued statements via the Derry Journal. Shortly after its foundation, it offered an "amnesty" to all drug dealers, asking them to make themselves known to the group before giving an assurance that they had stopped dealing. In an interview with the Derry Journal in August 2009, the group's leadership explained: "We would monitor the actions of those who have come forward and, given an adequate period of time, interest in those drug dealers would cease and they could start to lead normal lives". The group claims to have an intelligence network within the Derry area and stated, "We would never act unless we hold undeniable evidence that the person punished has been dealing in drugs. We regularly compile information on certain individuals – including CCTV footage and statements from those who have received drugs from these people". As its name suggests, it comes from an Irish republican background.

In the 1990s, a group calling itself Direct Action Against Drugs (DAAD) operated in Northern Ireland and used similar methods. Many believe DAAD was linked to the Provisional Irish Republican Army. On the topic of politics, RAAD's leadership said: "There is absolutely no political agenda within our organisation. Our only aim is to eliminate drug dealers from our society and put an end to them destroying our community". The RAAD leadership claimed that some of its members had been involved with the Provisional IRA in the past, and added that Sinn Féin members and officials "have approached us privately, claiming that they support what we are attempting to achieve".

In an October 2010 interview with the Strabane Chronicle, a RAAD spokesman claimed all of its members are former republican volunteers who support the peace process. During an investigation into RAAD in June 2012, the home of the Sinn Féin Mayor of Derry, Kevin Campbell, was raided and searched by the Police Service of Northern Ireland (PSNI). The group was the focus of a 2010 BBC Northern Ireland Spotlight documentary.

In April 2010, RAAD announced its amnesty for drug dealers would end on 1 June 2010 and that anyone continuing to sell drugs afterwards could be killed. In early June, the Derry Journal reported that RAAD had ordered ten drug dealers to leave Derry immediately. The following month, it claimed that it had given another Derry man 48 hours to leave the country. Around the same time, a Derry teenager publicly apologised for having sold drugs after he was threatened by the group.

In July 2010, Kieran McCool; a 42-year-old Derry man was arrested after police found a "scanning device, paramilitary clothing and balaclavas" in his car and a makeshift stun gun in his home. He was described in court as a "key member" of RAAD, but he denied the charge and claimed the stun gun was for his own protection. A detective said that attacks by RAAD had lessened since the McCool's arrest. As part of his bail conditions He was electronically tagged and put under curfew. In 2011 he pleaded guilty and received an eight month suspended sentence.

RAAD claimed its first killing in February 2012 when it shot dead Andrew Allen, a father of two, at his home in an estate in Ludden outside Buncrana, County Donegal. Although this was strongly denied by his family, the group claimed Allen had been warned to stop drug dealing but had not done so. They added that Allen was one of six people who would be executed. Later that month, it was reported that RAAD had begun operating in North Belfast, although it is not known if the Belfast group was linked to the one in Derry.

In June 2012, RAAD members attacked a PSNI vehicle in Derry with a blast bomb. This was the first time it had attacked security forces, claiming the attack was "a direct response to increased and ever more brutal attacks on republicans and their families" and warned that such attacks would continue "as long as the security forces continue to victimise republican areas". By the time of the attack, many republicans were claiming that RAAD had become a political, dissident republican group.

On 26 July, an announcement was made that RAAD was merging with the Real IRA and other dissident republican paramilitaries, but not including the Continuity IRA. This created a new organization known as the New IRA.

In 2019, following an inquest held in Buncrana, the detective leading the investigation into Andrew Allen's murder told the media that RAAD's claims about their victim were "rubbish".

== Timeline ==
The following is a timeline of actions that have been claimed by, or blamed on, Republican Action Against Drugs.

=== 2009 ===
- 16 April: RAAD claimed responsibility for detonating a pipe bomb at a house on Balmoral Avenue, Derry.
- 8 June: RAAD claimed responsibility for detonating a pipe bomb under a car in Manorcunningham, County Donegal.
- 7 October: RAAD claimed responsibility for kidnapping and shooting a 27-year-old man in the foot in Derry.
- 17 October: RAAD claimed responsibility for shooting a 17-year-old boy in both legs at a house on Virginia Court, Derry.
- 6 December: RAAD claimed responsibility for planting five pipe bombs in Derry. Four targeted cars and the fifth was planted behind a house. Three of the bombs exploded.
- 11 December: RAAD claimed responsibility for kidnapping and shooting two men (aged 29 and 27) in the legs in Derry. One of the men later admitted that he had been involved in dealing "dodgy merchandise".

=== 2010 ===
==== January–June ====
- 27 January: RAAD was blamed for shooting a 52-year-old man in the legs at his shop on Waterloo Street, Derry. It is thought the man was targeted for selling 'legal highs'. The attacker fled on a motorcycle.
- 23 February: RAAD claimed responsibility for shooting a 29-year-old man in both legs on Rinmore Drive, Derry. In a statement to a local newspaper, RAAD claimed that the man had been warned about his activities and that he had been "punished" for failing to heed that warning.
- 28 March: RAAD claimed responsibility for exploding two pipe bombs in Derry. One exploded in a van on High Park and another exploded in a car on Carrickreagh Gardens.
- 28 March: RAAD claimed responsibility for planting an explosive device outside a head shop in Letterkenny, County Donegal. It was made safe by the Irish Army. In a statement, RAAD said it was the "first and only warning" the shop would receive. It closed shortly thereafter.
- 30 March: RAAD claimed in a statement that its members had fired a shot at a house in Dungiven, County Londonderry. It added that the members "arrested" a man in the town who later "gave an undertaking to cease his activity immediately".
- 13 April: RAAD were blamed for and later claimed responsibility for the shooting a 24-year-old man in the leg at his house on Cable Street, Derry.
- 19 April: RAAD claimed responsibility for exploding two pipe bombs at houses in the Derry area. One exploded at a house on Spruce Meadows in Culmore and another at a house on Westland Street in Derry.
- 19 April: RAAD claimed responsibility for shooting a 24-year-old man in both legs at a house on Lisnafin Park in Strabane, County Tyrone.
- 20 April: RAAD claimed responsibility for exploding a pipe bomb outside a house on Dunmore Gardens, Derry.
- 21 April: RAAD were blamed for exploding a pipe bomb outside a house on Anderson Crescent, Limavady.
- 22 May: RAAD were blamed for shooting a 25-year-old man in his home at Glebe Gardens, Strabane. He was shot once in each leg and once in the arm. The man had recently returned from England, after being threatened by RAAD for dealing cocaine. The gunmen told him to leave Northern Ireland within 24 hours. On 3 June, the man's then-vacant house was set alight.
- 23 May: RAAD were blamed for exploding a pipe bomb in a car at O'Nolan Park, Strabane.
- 27 May: RAAD claimed responsibility for exploding a pipe bomb at a house in Springhill Park, Strabane. The group said it was a warning to the owner to cease drug dealing.
- 28 May: RAAD claimed responsibility for planting a pipe bomb in the Celtic Bar on Stanley's Walk, Derry; it failed to explode.
- 3 June: RAAD were blamed for exploding a pipe bomb inside a parked car in the Ballycolman area of Strabane. Four masked men smashed the car window and threw the bomb inside shortly after midnight.
- 3 June: RAAD claimed responsibility for exploding a pipe bomb inside a car in the Ardgrange area of Derry.
- 8 June: RAAD claimed responsibility for exploding a pipe bomb at the door of a house in the Ardgrange area of Derry, claiming the owner was a "career criminal" selling heroin.
- 8 June: RAAD claimed that it held a "show of strength" in the Creggan area of Derry. RAAD members allegedly searched a row of shops before firing 80 shots in the air using automatic weapons.
- 15 June: RAAD claimed to have seized "several thousand" ecstasy pills from a criminal gang and handed them to a community worker in Derry for destruction.
- 25 June: RAAD were blamed for exploding a pipe bomb at the front door of a house on Hawthorn Drive, Derry. The house was owned by a convicted drug smuggler and his partner, who had recently been fined for drug possession. The group later claimed responsibility.

==== July–December ====
- 17 July: RAAD were blamed for shooting a taxi driver in both legs at Glebe Gardens, Strabane.
- 26 July: RAAD claimed responsibility for raiding a house in Dunmore Gardens, Derry. Four men entered the house (which was occupied) and fired shots before leaving. RAAD stated that the homeowner had ignored its warnings to stop dealing drugs. The man later admitted this, and claimed that he had stopped dealing drugs since the raid.
- 31 August: RAAD claimed responsibility for firing shots at a house in Dove Gardens, Derry. It also claimed to have discovered and destroyed 12 cannabis plants in a house a week earlier. When the PSNI responded to the incident they were attacked with petrol bombs and other missiles.
- 18 September: a RAAD member fired warning shots during a disturbance on Bligh's Lane, Derry. A news report claimed that shots were fired at a group of youths, but RAAD claimed the shots had been fired "over their heads". In a statement to the Derry Journal, it said "We were left with no option but to act after the people involved attacked a house at Rinmore Drive to gain entry to drink and take drugs". It claimed the youths had been involved in "drug dealing, drug taking, joyriding, assaults, arson and intimidation of local residents" in the area.
- 17 October: RAAD claimed responsibility for shooting a 20-year-old man in the legs at his home in Slievemore Park, Derry. He had been convicted of assaulting an ambulance driver in 2007 and RAAD claimed that he continued to be involved in "anti-social behaviour and criminality".
- 23 October: RAAD claimed responsibility for shooting a 20-year-old man as he delivered food to a house in Creggan Heights, Derry. He was hit six times in the legs. The group claimed he was involved in drug dealing and that had been "under close surveillance" for the past ten months. The man later admitted being a drug dealer and claimed to have stopped after the shooting.
- 21 November: RAAD were blamed for exploding a pipe bomb inside a man's car at Cromore Gardens, Derry. The man, Jose Santos, a Portuguese national, denied being involved in drug dealing.

=== 2011 ===
- 7 March: RAAD claimed responsibility for firing shots at a house in Muff, County Donegal. In a statement, it said it had "attempted to execute" a named individual, adding, "Only for a malfunctioning weapon he would be dead". On 24 May 2011, it claimed responsibility for an incendiary bomb attack on the same house.
- 13 March: RAAD was blamed for shooting a 20-year-old man in the legs at Springhill Park, Strabane.
- 2 June: RAAD claimed responsibility for detonating a small bomb at the door of a house on Lecky Road, Derry. Shrapnel went through two nearby windows but there were no injuries. The group apologized for "causing any distress". On 7 July, it claimed responsibility for shooting a 36-year-old man in the legs at a house on the same road.
- 17 November: RAAD claimed responsibility for shooting a 61-year-old man at a house in Ballyarnet, Derry. Three days later, it claimed responsibility for shooting a 22-year-old man in the legs at a house on Creggan Road in the city.
- 13 December: RAAD was blamed for shooting two men, one of whom is a nephew of Martin McGuinness, in the legs at High Park, Derry.

=== 2012–2014 ===
- 9 February 2012: RAAD claimed responsibility for shooting dead Andrew Allen (24) at his home in Lisfannon, Buncrana, County Donegal. The shots were fired through the window of a ground-floor bedroom after gunmen failed to gain entry through the door. The car used by the gunmen was later found burnt-out at Fahan. RAAD said that Allen had been warned to stop drug dealing but had not done so. It also claimed Allen had used RAAD's name to scare other dealers.
- 3 April 2012: RAAD claimed responsibility for beating a 26-year-old man and shooting him in the leg at his home in the Ballycolman area of Strabane.
- 26 April 2012: in Derry, a mother was forced to bring her 18-year-old son to be shot in the legs by members of RAAD. The mother said her son had been "dealing drugs to feed his habit". She added, "It could have been worse. I honestly feared that he was going to be found dead having overdosed in a flat somewhere ... I also believe that it was better he is shot in the legs now, than shot in the head further down the line". Two days later, about 200 people attended an anti-RAAD rally in the city.
- 1 May 2012: RAAD claimed responsibility for shooting a man in both arms and both legs at his home in St Johnston, County Donegal.
- 2 June 2012: RAAD claimed responsibility for throwing a blast bomb at a Police Service of Northern Ireland vehicle during a security alert in Derry. They also warned that more attacks on security forces would follow.
- July 2012: RAAD ceased to exist as it merged with RIRA and other dissident groups to form the 'New IRA'.
- 26 March 2014: A small bomb exploded in a car parked outside a house in the Creggan area of Derry. The blast wrecked the car but caused no injuries. Social Democratic and Labour Party politician Pat Ramsey blamed the attack on the RAAD saying it bore the hallmarks of the RAAD, though victims said they didn't believe dissidents were responsible.
