= New Irish Republican Army =

Irish Republican armed group formed in 2012

- Óglaigh na hÉireann
- Other name: Irish Republican Army
- Leader: Army Council
- Founded: 2012
- Dates active: 2012–present
- Merger of: Real IRA; RAAD
- Active regions: Northern Ireland (mainly); Republic of Ireland
- Ideology: Irish republicanism Dissident republicanism Irish republican legitimism Socialism
- Size: 250–300 (as of September 2012)

The New Irish Republican Army, or New IRA, is an Irish republican paramilitary group. It is a continuation of the Real Irish Republican Army (Real IRA), which began to be called the 'New IRA' in July 2012 when Republican Action Against Drugs (RAAD) and other small republican militant groups merged with it. The group calls itself simply "the Irish Republican Army". The New IRA has launched many attacks against the Police Service of Northern Ireland (PSNI) and the British Army. It is the largest and most active of the "dissident republican" paramilitary groups but still much smaller than the original IRA, waging a campaign against the British security forces in Northern Ireland.

== History ==
=== Origin ===
On 26 July 2012, it was reported that Republican Action Against Drugs (RAAD) and other small republican militant groups were merging with the Real IRA. As before, the group would continue to refer to itself as "the Irish Republican Army".

After the merger, the media began to refer to the group as the "New IRA". As well as RAAD, the alliance includes an east Tyrone group thought to be responsible for killing PSNI officer Ronan Kerr in 2011, and a Belfast group who badly wounded PSNI officer Peadar Heffron in 2010.

=== Membership ===
As of 2012, the PSNI believed that the new group had a membership of "between 250 and 300 military activists, backed up by associates". In November 2012 the group claimed responsibility for killing a prison officer near Lurgan, the first prison officer to be killed since 1993.

=== Actions ===
On 3 September 2012, prominent Real IRA member Alan Ryan was shot dead in Dublin. Gardaí believed that he had been involved in a feud with major crime gangs from whom he was trying to extort money. Following Ryan's death an internal feud developed in the Real IRA. Ryan's replacement as leader and another associate were shot and wounded in November 2012, on the orders of the Northern leadership. In March 2013, another prominent former Real IRA member, Peter Butterly from Dunleer, was shot dead; three Dublin men, allegedly from the Alan Ryan faction, were charged with his murder and Real IRA membership.

In February 2014, the group sent seven letter bombs to British Army recruitment offices in south-east England; the first time republicans had struck in Britain since 2001. The following month, a PSNI Land Rover was hit by an explosively formed projectile in Belfast. A civilian car was also hit by debris, but there were no injuries. The Real IRA claimed responsibility. In November 2014, a PSNI armoured jeep was hit by another 'horizontal mortar' in Derry, and in Belfast a PSNI Land Rover was attacked with a homemade rocket-propelled grenade (RPG) launcher.

On Halloween morning, 2015, three men were arrested and charged with IRA membership in addition to firearm offences. In November, a PSNI vehicle in Belfast was riddled with automatic gunfire, fired from an AK-47. On Christmas Day in North Belfast, police came under fire from the republicans again but were not injured. The attacker was charged with attempted murder.

Following the murder of Vincent Ryan, Alan Ryan's brother, on 29 February 2016, an individual claiming to represent 'Action Against Drugs' told the Irish Mirror that all drug dealers were legitimate targets. On 4 March 2016, a prison officer (Adrian Ismay) died of a heart attack in hospital, having received serious wounds following a booby-trap bomb detonating under his van on Hillsborough Drive, East Belfast, 11 days earlier. The New IRA claimed responsibility and said it was a response to the alleged mistreatment of republican prisoners at Maghaberry Prison. It added that the officer was targeted because he trained prison officers at Maghaberry.

On 8 April 2016, Gardaí arrested two significant members of the New IRA and seized €10,000. On 13 April, explosives linked to the New IRA were found in Dublin and several people were questioned by police. On 18 April 2016, the New IRA were blamed for badly injuring a man in a punishment shooting in Derry, shortly after a man had been killed by a dissident Republican attack in Ardoyne. On 25 April a New IRA member, Michael Barr was shot dead in west Dublin. Gardaí suspected Barr was shot dead because it was believed by the Kinahan cartel that he had provided a "safe house" to one of the gunmen in the Regency Hotel attack. Fifteen people were arrested in Northern Ireland following a paramilitary funeral for him.

On 9–10 May 2016, three men were shot in separate paramilitary style attacks in republican areas in Belfast, leaving two injured and one dead. The terrorist threat level in Great Britain was upgraded to "substantial" on 11 May 2016, with the New IRA's continuing threats being part of the reason by Home Secretary Theresa May and MI5.

In June 2016, it was revealed that a five-man New IRA hit team were in Dublin's north inner city looking to murder two leading gangsters after one of their associates was shot dead in a gangland feud. Sources said the murder squad from the North spent several days and nights looking for their targets in the streets. In September 2016 an associate of Alan Ryan, who had been arrested and imprisoned in 1999 following the Stamullen raid, was sentenced to nine years' imprisonment in Belfast for possession of a sub-machine gun and ammunition, after being stopped on his return journey to Belfast from Dublin.

In Cork City at 5 pm on 7 December 2016, former Chief of Staff of the RIRA southern command, Aidan "The Beast" O'Driscoll, was shot and killed in the street by two masked gunmen. O'Driscoll had been shot in the leg in June 2013 in what the New IRA claimed was a punishment-style shooting for "unrepublican conduct" before he had stepped-down from command in 2012.

On 7 June 2017, Gardaí foiled a serious IRA bomb plot after discovering six kilos of Semtex, "enough to blow up a street".

On 1 September 2017, the Police Service of Northern Ireland warned that the group had developed a new type of bomb.

In December 2017, MI5 said that Northern Ireland has the highest level of terrorist activity of anywhere in Europe with attacks being disrupted weekly. Over 250 seizures, thwarted attacks, and counter-terrorist operations are reported to have been undertaken by British security services.

The group remained active in 2018, with it and the Continuity IRA claiming they have no plans to announce a ceasefire along the lines of that of the ONH. However, both groups have suffered major setbacks and inactivity due to feuding and heavy police intervention, and have likewise often failed to commit successful attacks due to antiquated equipment and member inexperience.

In July 2018, the New IRA claimed responsibility for a spate of gun and bomb attacks on police officers during the riots in Derry.

On 19 January 2019, there was a car bomb attack at the Bishop Street Courthouse in Derry, for which the New IRA are the "main line of enquiry". Four men were arrested in connection with the bombing. The following month, two men were shot in the city of Derry, in what was described as a "paramilitary attack" by New IRA members.

On 5 March 2019 at around 12:00 pm three explosive devices were found in packages that were found in Jiffy bags at Waterloo station and City Airport in London, as well as a separate package found nearby Heathrow Airport. MI5 warned that the possibility of Republicans being behind the suspicious packages as "possible". Also on 5 March, a parcel bomb was found in the store room of the University of Glasgow at around 11:40 am. The West Blocks of the university were evacuated by the police and the bomb was safely detonated under a controlled explosion by a bomb disposal unit. Nobody was injured. On 11 March 2019, it was reported that a group stylising themselves as the IRA claimed to be behind the explosive devices, stating that they had sent 5 devices, but only 4 had been discovered. The fifth device was discovered on 22 March in a postal sorting office in the Irish city of Limerick. The device was addressed to Charing Cross railway station in central London.

On 18 April 2019, rioting took place on the streets of the Creggan in Derry after the PSNI launched a raid looking for munitions. During the unrest, a member of New IRA fatally shot journalist Lyra McKee—who was not the intended victim—and the organisation later claimed responsibility and issued a statement of apology to her family and friends. Using their traditional Easter Rising commemorations various other Republican groupings including Sinn Féin and Éirígí expressly called for an end to all armed actions, while others including the 32 County Sovereignty Movement condemned the attack without adding a call for the end of violence. The Irish Republican Socialist Party cancelled its Easter Rising commemoration in Derry as a direct result of Lyra McKee's death. Republican murals around the city of Derry, including the famous Free Derry Corner gable end wall, were amended over the weekend following Lyra McKee's death expressing a community desire to move away from the violence of the past and disowning the dissident groupings who desire a return to it. These events have been cited as a sign of change in attitude towards dissidents in traditionally Republican areas.

On 7 June 2019, the New IRA claimed responsibility for a potentially lethal bomb discovered on 1 June fitted under the car of a police officer at a golf club in east Belfast. A cross-border investigation was launched.

On 18 August 2020, ten suspects were arrested in Northern Ireland as part of an all-island operation against the New IRA. The PSNI and Gardaí joined forces for 48 hours to carry out arrests and searches. The PSNI said that officers had made a number of arrests under the Terrorism Act across Northern Ireland in relation to New IRA activities. Those arrested were held in PSNI custody suites in Belfast. The PSNI raided properties in Derry, East Tyrone and Belfast. In the Republic Gardaí raided properties in Dublin, Cork, Kerry and Laois but arrested nobody.

On 21 April 2021, the group said that it had planted an explosive device behind a PSNI officer's car in Dungiven. The device was made safe by the bomb disposal unit.

On 17 February 2022, the group claimed responsibility for shooting a man in the legs in Strabane the week before.

On 17 November 2022, the New IRA claimed responsibility for a bomb attack in which two PSNI officers were targeted by an explosive device which detonated near their vehicle while they were on patrol in Strabane, County Tyrone. Neither officer was seriously injured in the attack.

The New IRA admitted in a typed statement that it had carried out the attempted murder of PSNI Detective Chief Inspector John Caldwell, who was shot multiple times by two gunmen in front of his son and other children after a youth football session he had been coaching on 22 February 2023. As of 26 February 2023, the PSNI had arrested six people in connection with the attempted murder. Rallies in County Tyrone organized under the slogan 'No Going Back', in reference to the violence of The Troubles, condemned the shooting.

On 9 April 2023, the PSNI foiled a bomb plot that was aimed to disrupt US President Joe Biden's visit to Belfast on 12 April, to mark the 25th anniversary of the Good Friday Agreement.

On 22 May 2024, the PSNI arrested two men in Derry and seized an AK-47 variant assault rifle.

On 30 March 2026, a pizza delivery driver was forced at gunpoint to deliver an explosive to a police station in Lurgan. The New IRA claimed responsibility for the operation on 3 April.

On 26 April 2026, a car was hijacked and later exploded outside of a police station in Dunmurry, with police suspecting the New IRA. They claimed responsibility days later and announced the homes of police officers are potential targets.

On 21 July 2026, a car being driven by a woman in her 20s was stopped by Gardai near Carrickmacross and discovered to contain an 'extremely significant' bomb. The car was intended to be driven across the border, with the New IRA allegedly being responsible. A man in his 40s was subsequently arrested in Dublin.

== Status ==
On 30 June 2023, the United States added the New IRA into the list of Foreign Terrorist Organisations. It is widely considered that Saoradh is the political wing of the New IRA.
