= 2000 MI6 attack =

Attack in London

Coordinates: 51.4873°N 0.1243°W

MI6 attack
- Location: Vauxhall, Lambeth, London
- Date: 20 September 2000 (26 years ago); 21:45 (BST)
- Target: SIS Building
- Attack type: Anti-tank rocket
- Weapon: Russian-built RPG-22
- Deaths: 0
- Injuries: 0
- Perpetrator: Real IRA

On Wednesday 20 September 2000, the Real Irish Republican Army (RIRA) carried out an attack on MI6's SIS Building headquarters in Vauxhall, Lambeth, London. A Russian-built RPG-22 anti-tank rocket, fired 300 metres (330 yards) away from MI6 headquarters, struck the building on the south side of the eighth floor, causing superficial damage. No fatalities or injuries were recorded.

Although London had been the target of terrorist attacks before 2000, it had not been subjected to a rocket launcher attack; this was the first time a RPG-22 rocket launcher was seen and used in Great Britain. It was initially thought the Real IRA acquired the launchers from the Provisional IRA's arsenal, but later confirmed it was brought from Yugoslavia. The "audacious" attack caused minimal damage due to the building's bullet-proof and bomb-proof structure, failing to penetrate the inner cladding.

At the time of the attack, the constituency of South Antrim was preparing for a by-election to be held the following day; it was won by Democratic Unionist William McCrea, who defeated Ulster Unionist David Burnside.

== Background ==
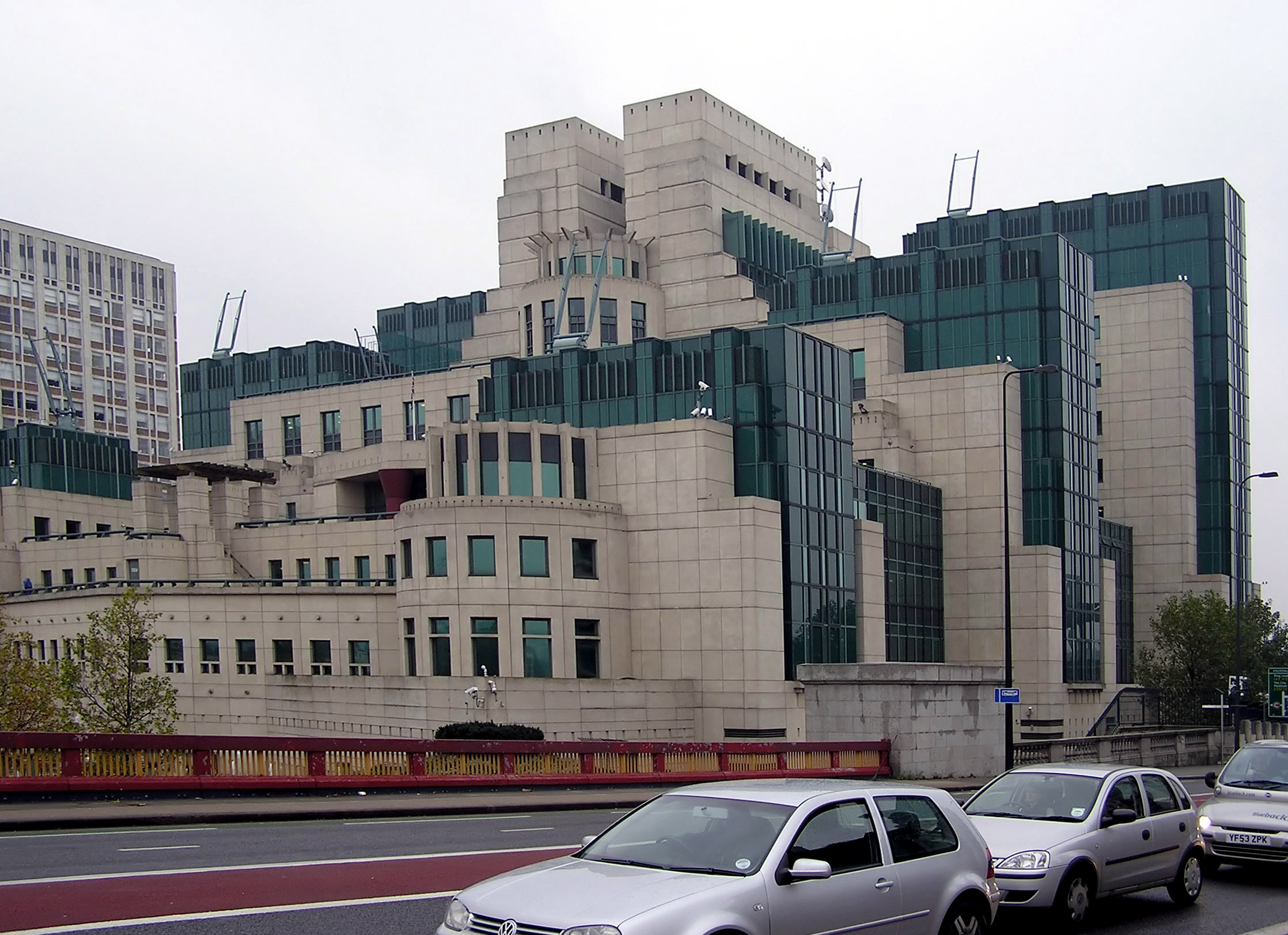
The SIS building, headquarters of MI6

London had been the target of a similar attack in 1991 when an IRA mortar shell was fired at 10 Downing Street and exploded during a cabinet meeting held by then Prime Minister John Major. Before the Real IRA's MI6 attack, Hammersmith Bridge was damaged by a small bomb blast in June 2000, resulting in the bridge requiring renovation. A further planting of a bomb occurred near a west London train station in July 2000.

A by-election in the constituency of South Antrim was scheduled to be held the day after the attack. Democratic Unionist William McCrea was elected with 37.95% of the votes, defeating fellow candidates Ulster Unionist David Burnside, Donovan McClelland of the Social Democratic and Labour Party, Martin Meehan of Sinn Féin, David Ford of the Alliance Party of Northern Ireland and David Collins of the Natural Law Party.

== Details of the attack ==
Three members of the RIRA went into an area of Vauxhall Gardens and used a grassy knoll to fire their 2.8 kg RPG-22 missile about 300 metres away from the SIS Building. At 21:45 the grenade caused damage to a green plated glass window, metres below sensitive satellite equipment on the building's roof which was believed to be the main target. The force of the explosion was felt by people who were in underground stations and in nearby cars.

== Reaction ==
The attack was condemned by the Deputy Assistant Commissioner and head of the Anti-Terrorist Branch of the Metropolitan Police Alan Fry as an "audacious attack in a busy part of London". Security procedures at the SIS Building were reviewed by the British Government in conjunction with the Metropolitan Police.

Police sealed off an area between Vauxhall and Lambeth bridges to allow further investigations to occur. Services from Waterloo station were cancelled until the mid-afternoon on 21 September.

== Investigation ==
A discarded launcher was discovered in Vauxhall Gardens, along with remnants of the rocket. In an effort to trace the source of the RPG-22, security officers analysed the serial number located on the rocket launcher, which was identified to have originated from a cache of weapons in Croatia. A stockpile of RPG-22s were ordered by the Real IRA in July 2000 and were seized by Croatian police.

Police in London conducted a fingertip search of nearby railway lines running into Waterloo station, which promoted speculation that the missile was fired from railway lines. There were extensive searches around the area of the SIS Building.

== See also ==
- 2001 Ealing bombing
- 2001 Birmingham bombing
