= Real Irish Republican Army =

Irish republican paramilitary group split from the Provisional IRA in 1997

- Óglaigh na hÉireann
- Leadership: Army Council
- Dates active: 1997–2012
- Split from: Provisional Irish Republican Army
- Merged into: New Irish Republican Army
- Active regions: Northern Ireland (mainly); Republic of Ireland; England
- Ideology: Irish republicanism Dissident republicanism
- Size: 150 (June 2005)
- Wars: The Troubles (1997–1998); Dissident Irish republican campaign (ongoing)

The Real Irish Republican Army, or Real IRA (RIRA), was a dissident Irish republican paramilitary group that aimed to bring about a United Ireland. It was formed in 1997 following a split in the Provisional IRA by dissident members, who rejected the IRA's ceasefire that year. Like the Provisional IRA before it, the Real IRA saw itself as the only rightful successor to the original Irish Republican Army and styled itself as simply "the Irish Republican Army" in English or Óglaigh na hÉireann in Irish. It was an illegal organisation in the Republic of Ireland and designated a proscribed terrorist organisation in the United Kingdom and the United States.

The Real IRA waged a campaign in Northern Ireland against the Police Service of Northern Ireland—formerly the Royal Ulster Constabulary—and the British Army. It was the largest and most active of the "dissident republican" paramilitary groups operating against the British security forces. It targeted the security forces in firearm attacks and bombings, and with grenades, mortars and rockets.

The Real IRA was also responsible for bombings in Northern Ireland and England with the goal of causing economic harm and disruption, the most notable being the 1998 Omagh bombing, which killed 29 people. After that bombing, the Real IRA went on ceasefire, but resumed operations in 2000. In March 2009 it claimed responsibility for an attack on Massereene Barracks which killed two British soldiers, the first to be killed in Northern Ireland since 1997. The Real IRA has also been involved in attacks on drug dealers.

In July 2012, it was reported that Republican Action Against Drugs (RAAD) and other small republican militant groups were merging with the Real IRA. This new entity was named the New IRA by the media but members continue to identify themselves as simply "the Irish Republican Army". Small pockets of the Real IRA that did not merge with the New IRA continue to have a presence in the Republic of Ireland, particularly in Cork and to a lesser extent in Dublin.

== Origins ==
In July 1997, the Provisional IRA called a ceasefire. On 10 October 1997, a Provisional IRA General Army Convention was held in Falcarragh, County Donegal. At the convention, Provisional IRA Quartermaster General Michael McKevitt—also a member of the 12-person Provisional IRA Executive—denounced the leadership and called for an end to the group's ceasefire and to its participation in the Northern Ireland peace process. He was backed by his partner and fellow Executive member Bernadette Sands McKevitt. The two dissidents were outmanoeuvred by the leadership and were left isolated. The convention backed the pro-ceasefire line, and on 26 October McKevitt and Sands McKevitt resigned from the Executive along with other members.

In November 1997, McKevitt and other dissidents held a meeting in a farmhouse in Oldcastle, County Meath, and a new organisation, styling itself Óglaigh na hÉireann, was formed. The organisation attracted disaffected Provisional IRA members from the republican stronghold of South Armagh, as well as Dublin, Belfast, Limerick, Tipperary, County Louth, County Tyrone and County Monaghan.

The name "Real IRA" entered common usage when in early 1998 members set up a roadblock in Jonesborough, County Armagh, and told motorists "We're from the IRA. The real IRA". By the summer of 1998, the organisation was estimated to number around 90 members, of whom approximately 30 were on active service at any one time.

== Objectives ==
The RIRA's objective was a united Ireland by forcing the end of British sovereignty over Northern Ireland through the use of physical force. The organisation rejected the Mitchell Principles and the Good Friday Agreement, comparing the latter to the 1921 Anglo-Irish Treaty which resulted in the partition of Ireland. The organisation aimed to uphold an uncompromising form of Irish republicanism and opposed any political settlement that falls short of Irish unity and independence.

Bernadette Sands McKevitt, sister of hunger striker Bobby Sands and a founder of the RIRA's political wing, the 32 County Sovereignty Movement, said in an interview that her brother "did not die for cross-border bodies with executive powers. He did not die for nationalists to be equal British citizens within the Northern Ireland state". The RIRA adopted a tactic of bombing town centres to damage the economic infrastructure of Northern Ireland. The organisation also attacked members of the security forces using land mines, home-made mortars and car bombs, and had also targeted England using incendiary devices and car bombs to "spread terror and disruption".

== Campaign ==
=== Early campaign ===
Real IRA leaders, allegedly after some persuasion by Liam Campbell, decided on a car bombing campaign to undermine the Good Friday Agreement negotiations by inducing Ulster Unionist Party politician's to abandon talks.The organisation's first action was an attempted bombing in Banbridge, County Down on 7 January 1998. The intention was to explode a 300-pound (140 kg) car bomb, but this was thwarted when the bomb was defused by security forces. The RIRA continued its campaign in late February with bombings in Moira, County Down and Portadown, County Armagh. On 9 May the organisation announced its existence, in a coded telephone call to Belfast media claiming responsibility for a mortar attack on a police station in Belleek, County Fermanagh.

The RIRA also carried out attacks in Newtownhamilton and Newry, and a second attack in Banbridge on 1 August injured 35 people and caused £3.5 million of damage when a 500-pound (230 kg) car bomb exploded. Despite these attacks the organisation lacked a significant base and was heavily infiltrated by informers. This led to a series of high-profile arrests and seizures by the Garda Síochána in the first half of 1998; these involved the death of RIRA member Rónán Mac Lochlainn who was shot dead trying to escape from police, following an attempted robbery of a security van in County Wicklow.

=== Omagh bombing ===
On 15 August 1998, the RIRA left a car containing 500 lb of home-made explosives in the centre of Omagh, County Tyrone. The bombers could not find a parking space near the intended target of the courthouse, and the car was left 400 metres away. As a result, three inaccurate telephone warnings were issued, and the Royal Ulster Constabulary (RUC) believed the bomb was located outside the courthouse. They attempted to establish a security cordon to keep civilians clear of the area, which inadvertently pushed people closer to the location of the bomb. Shortly after, the bomb exploded killing 29 people and injuring 220 others, in what became the single deadliest strike of the Troubles in Northern Ireland.

The bombing caused a major outcry throughout the world, and the Irish and British governments introduced new legislation in an attempt to destroy the organisation. The RIRA also came under pressure from the Provisional IRA, when Provisional IRA members visited the homes of 60 people connected with the RIRA and ordered them to disband and stop interfering with Provisional IRA arms dumps. With the organisation under intense pressure, which included McKevitt and Sands-McKevitt being forced from their home after the media named McKevitt in connection with the bombing, the RIRA called a ceasefire on 8 September.

=== Ceasefire ===
Following the declaration of the ceasefire the RIRA began to regroup, and by the end of October had elected a new leadership and were planning their future direction. In late December, Irish government representative Martin Mansergh held a meeting with McKevitt in Dundalk, in an attempt to convince McKevitt to disband the RIRA. McKevitt refused, stating that members would be left defenceless against attacks by the Provisional IRA. In 1999, the RIRA began preparations for a renewed campaign, and in May three members travelled to Split in Croatia to purchase arms, which were smuggled back to Ireland. On 20 October, ten people were arrested when Gardaí raided a RIRA training camp near Stamullen, County Meath.

Officers found a firing range inside a disused wine cellar being used as an underground bunker, and seized weapons including an assault rifle, a submachine gun, a semi-automatic pistol and an RPG-18 rocket launcher. An earlier version of the rocket launcher, the RPG-7, had been in the possession of the Provisional IRA from as early as 1972, but this was the first time the RPG-18 had been found in the possession of a paramilitary organisation in Ireland.

=== Return to activity ===
On 20 January 2000, the RIRA issued a call-to-arms in a statement to the Irish News. The statement condemned the Northern Ireland Executive, and stated: "Once again, Óglaigh na hÉireann declares the right of the Irish people to the ownership of Ireland. We call on all volunteers loyal to the Irish Republic to unite to uphold the Republic and establish a permanent national parliament representative of all the people." The RIRA launched its new campaign on 25 February with an attempted bombing of Shackleton Army Barracks in Ballykelly. The bombers were disturbed as they were assembling the device, which would have caused mass murder if detonated, according to soldiers.

On 29 February, a rocket launcher similar to one seized in the 1999 raid was found near an army base in Dungannon, County Tyrone, and on 15 March three men were arrested following the discovery of 500 lb of home-made explosives when the RUC searched two cars in Hillsborough, County Down. On 6 April a bomb attack took place at Ebrington Barracks in Derry. RIRA members lowered a device consisting of 5 lb of homemade explosives over the perimeter fence using ropes, and the bomb subsequently exploded damaging the fence and an unmanned guardhouse.

==== Bombings in England ====
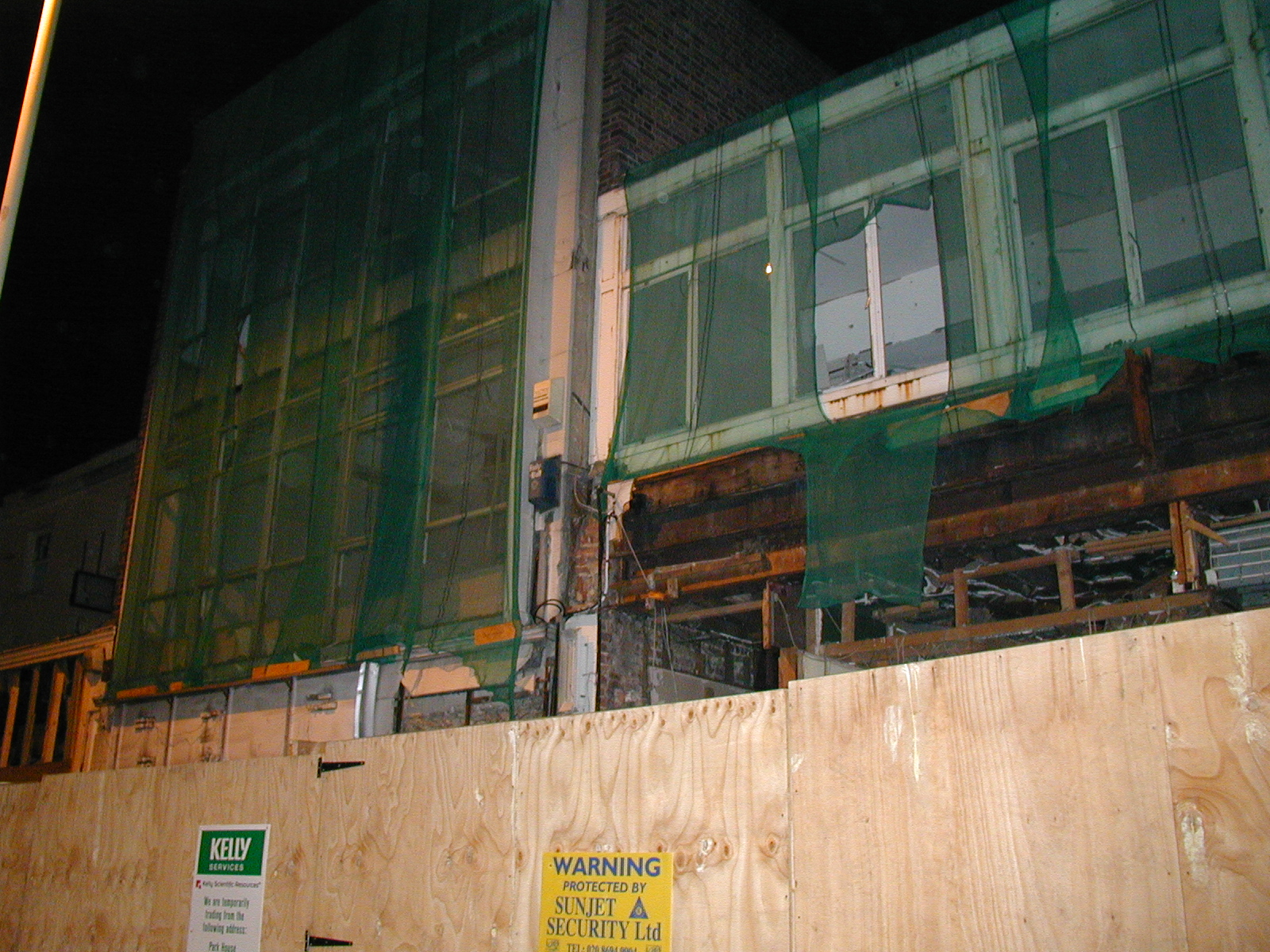
The damage caused by the 3 August 2001 Ealing bombing

After the Omagh bombing, the RIRA leadership were unwilling to launch a full-scale campaign in Northern Ireland due to the possibility of civilians being killed. Instead they decided to launch a series of attacks in England, in particular London, which they hoped would attract disenchanted Provisional IRA members to join the RIRA. On 1 June 2000, a bomb damaged Hammersmith Bridge, a symbolic target for Irish republican paramilitary groups. The bridge had been targeted by the Irish Republican Army on 29 March 1939 as part of its Sabotage Campaign, and by the Provisional IRA on 24 April 1996.

On 19 July, security forces carried out a controlled explosion on a bomb left at Ealing Broadway station and public transport was disrupted when the Metropolitan Police closed Victoria and Paddington train stations and halted services on the London Underground. On 21 September a rocket-propelled grenade was fired at the MI6 headquarters using an RPG-22 rocket launcher, which generated headlines around the world. In November 2000, security forces foiled a plot to drive 500 lb of homemade explosives to central London that month, a bomb twice as powerful as the one in Omagh. At the time, police were warning for weeks that a terrorist attack in London could be imminent.

On 21 February 2001, a bomb disguised as a torch left outside a Territorial Army base in Shepherd's Bush seriously injured a 14-year-old cadet, who was blinded and had his hand blown off. A second attack in Shepherd's Bush, the 4 March BBC bombing, injured a civilian outside the BBC Television Centre. The explosion was captured by a BBC cameraman, and the footage was broadcast on TV stations worldwide, and gained mass publicity for the group. On 14 April, a bomb exploded at a postal sorting office in Hendon, causing minor damage but no injuries. Three weeks later on 6 May, a second bomb exploded at the same building, causing slight injuries to a passer-by. The 3 August 2001 Ealing bombing injured seven people, and on 3 November a car bomb containing 60 lb of home-made explosives was planted in the centre of Birmingham. The bomb did not fully detonate and no one was injured.

==== Renewed campaign in Northern Ireland ====
The successful attack on Hammersmith Bridge encouraged the RIRA leadership to launch further attacks in Northern Ireland. On 19 June 2000 a bomb was found in the grounds of Hillsborough Castle, home of Secretary of State for Northern Ireland Peter Mandelson. On 30 June, a bomb exploded on the Dublin-to-Belfast railway line near the village of Meigh in County Armagh. The explosion damaged the tracks, and caused disruption to train services. On 9 July a car bomb damaged buildings in Stewartstown, County Tyrone including an RUC station, and on 10 August, an attack in Derry was thwarted by the RUC after a van containing a 500 lb bomb failed to stop at a police checkpoint. Following a car chase the bombers escaped across the Irish border, and the Irish Army carried out a controlled explosion on the bomb after the van was found abandoned in County Donegal.

On 13 September 2000, two 80 lb bombs were planted at the Magilligan army camp in County Londonderry, one of which was planted in a wooden hut and partially exploded when a soldier opened the door to the hut. The second bomb was found during a follow-up search and made safe by bomb disposal experts. On 11 November the RUC and British Army prevented a mortar attack after stopping a van near Derrylin, County Fermanagh, and the RUC prevented a further attack on 13 January 2001 when an 1100 lb bomb was found in Armagh – the largest bomb found in several years according to the RUC.

On 23 January, the RIRA attacked Ebrington Army Barracks in Derry for a second time, firing a mortar over a perimeter fence. A mortar similar to the one used in the attack was found by Gardaí near Newtowncunningham on 13 February, and British army bomb disposal experts made safe another mortar found between Dungannon and Carrickmore on 12 April. On 1 August a 40 lb bomb was discovered in a car at the long-stay car park of Belfast International Airport following a telephone warning, and was made safe with two controlled explosions by bomb disposal experts. In December a six-day security operation ended when a 70 lb bomb found under railway tracks at Killeen Bridge near Newry was defused. The operation began following telephone warnings, and the road and railway line connecting Newry to Dundalk were closed due to security alerts.

A pipe bomb was discovered at a police officer's home in Annalong, County Down on 3 January 2002, and two teenage boys were injured in County Armagh on 2 March when a bomb hidden in a traffic cone exploded. On 29 March 2002 the RIRA targeted a former member of the Royal Irish Regiment from Sion Mills, County Tyrone, with a bomb attached to his car that failed to explode. On 1 August 2002 a civilian worker was killed by an explosion at a Territorial Army base in Derry. The man, a 51-year-old former member of the Ulster Defence Regiment, was the thirtieth person killed by the RIRA.

=== Arrests ===
Despite the RIRA's renewed activity, the organisation was weakened by the arrest of key members and continued infiltration by informers. McKevitt was arrested on 29 March 2001 and charged with membership of an illegal organisation and directing terrorism, and remanded into custody. In July 2001, following the arrests of McKevitt and other RIRA members, British and Irish government sources hinted that the organisation was now in disarray. Other key figures were jailed, including the RIRA's Director of Operations, Liam Campbell, who was convicted of membership of an illegal organisation, and Colm Murphy who was convicted of conspiring to cause the Omagh bombing, although this conviction was overturned on appeal.

On 10 April 2002, Ruairi Convey, from Donaghmede, Dublin, was jailed for three years for membership of the RIRA. During a search of his home a list of names and home addresses of members of the Gardaí's Emergency Response Unit was found. Five RIRA members were also convicted in connection with the 2001 bombing campaign in England, and received sentences varying from 16 years to 22 years' imprisonment. In October 2002, McKevitt and other RIRA members imprisoned in Portlaoise Prison issued a statement calling for the organisation to stand down. After a two-month trial, McKevitt was sentenced to twenty years' imprisonment in August 2003 after being convicted of directing terrorism.

=== 2002–2007 ===
After McKevitt's imprisonment, the RIRA regrouped and claimed responsibility for a series of firebomb attacks against premises in Belfast in November 2004, and an attack on a Police Service of Northern Ireland (PSNI) patrol in Ballymena during March 2006 was attributed to the RIRA by the Independent Monitoring Commission (IMC). On 9 August 2006, fire bomb attacks by the RIRA hit businesses in Newry, County Down. Buildings belonging to JJB Sports and Carpetright were destroyed, and ones belonging to MFI and TK Maxx were badly damaged. On 27 October 2006, a large amount of explosives was found in Kilbranish, Mount Leinster, County Carlow by police, who believe the RIRA were trying to derail the peace process with a bomb attack. The IMC believe the RIRA were also responsible for a failed mortar attack on Craigavon PSNI Station on 4 December 2006. The IMC's October 2006 report stated that the RIRA remains "active and dangerous" and that it seeks to "sustain its position as a terrorist organisation". The RIRA has stated it has no intention of calling a ceasefire unless a declaration of intent to withdraw from Northern Ireland is made by the British Government.

In a lengthy interview with the newspaper An Phoblacht in 2002, the leadership of the Provisional IRA said that the RIRA had "no coherent strategy".

=== 2007–2011 ===
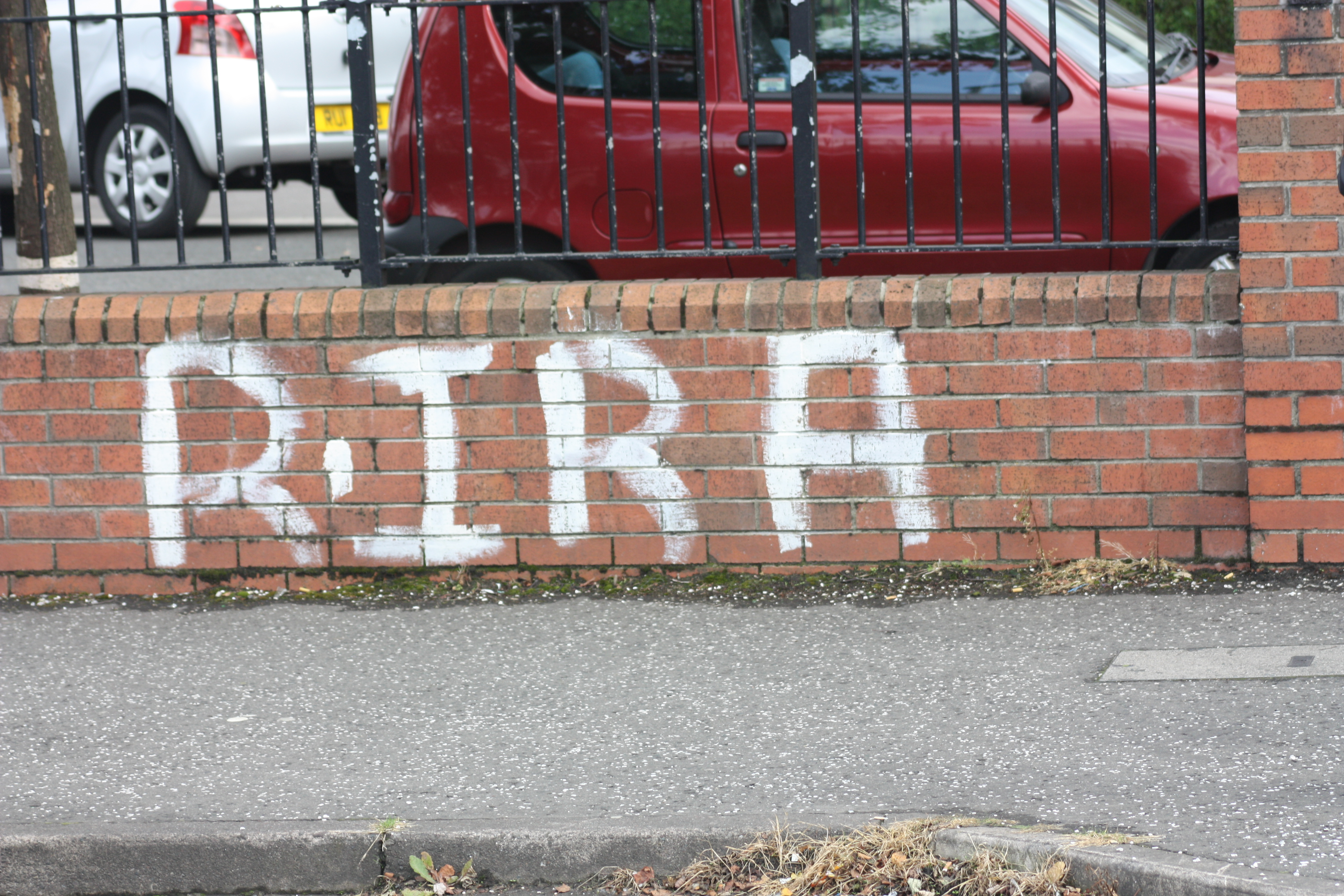
Real IRA graffiti in Bogside, Derry

On 8 November 2007, two RIRA members shot an off-duty PSNI officer as he sat in his car on Bishop Street in Derry, causing injuries to his face and arm. On 12 November another PSNI member was shot by RIRA members in Dungannon, County Tyrone. On 7 February 2008, the RIRA stated that, after experiencing a three-year period of reorganisation, it intended to "go back to war" by launching a new offensive against "legitimate targets". It also, despite having apologised for the Omagh bombing, denied any large scale involvement with the attack and said that their part had only gone as far as their codeword being used. On 12 May 2008 the RIRA seriously injured a member of the PSNI when a booby trap bomb exploded underneath his car near Spamount, County Tyrone. On 25 September 2008 the RIRA shot a man in the neck in St Johnston, near the County Londonderry border. The same man was targeted in a pipe bomb attack on his home on 25 October, the RIRA did not claim responsibility for the attack, but security forces believe they were responsible for it.

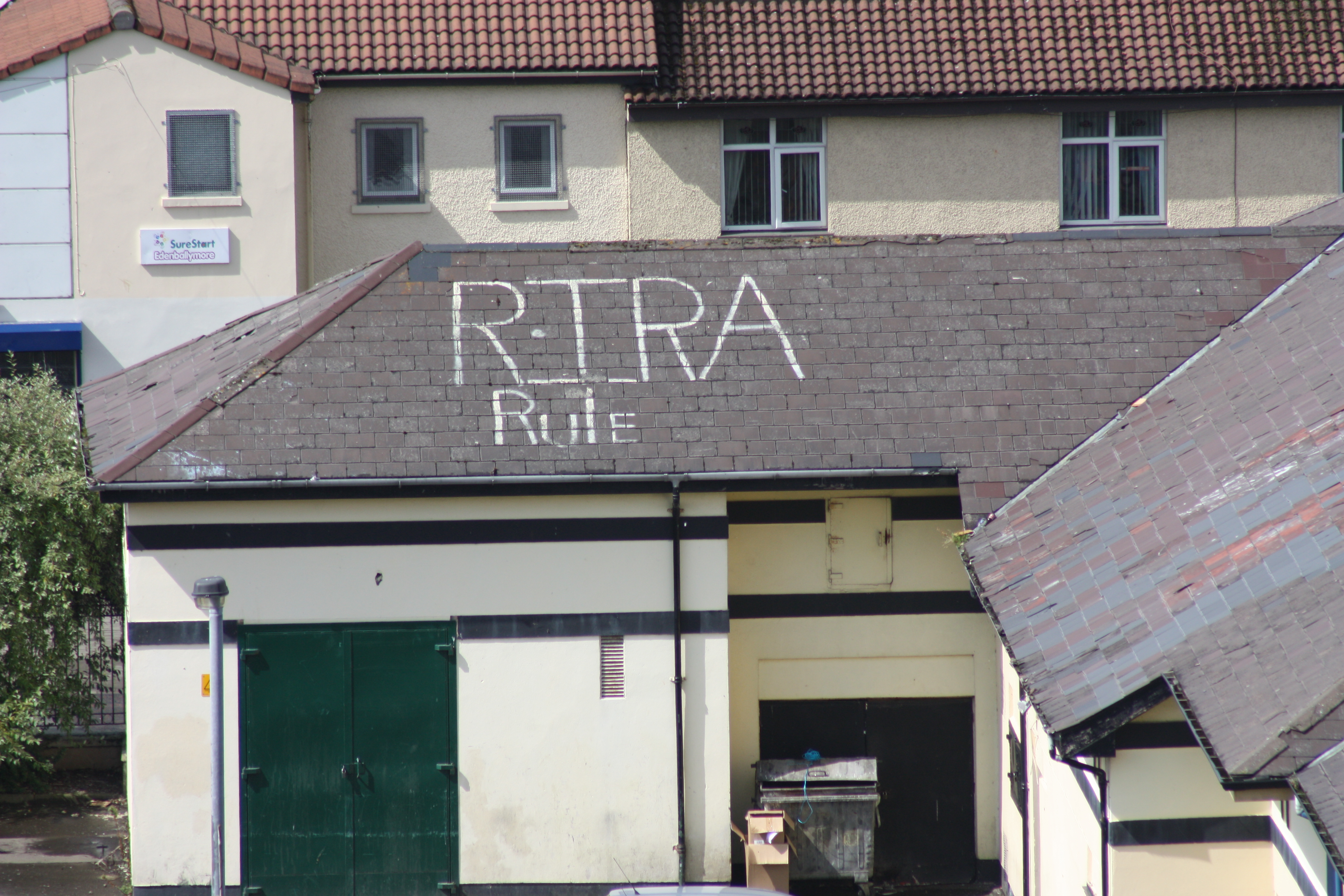
Pro-RIRA graffito on a roof in the Bogside, Derry, 2009

On 7 March 2009, the RIRA claimed responsibility for the 2009 Massereene Barracks shooting. This shooting occurred outside the Massereene Barracks as four soldiers were receiving a pizza delivery. Two soldiers were killed, and the other two soldiers and two deliverymen were injured. On 3 April 2009, the RIRA in Derry claimed responsibility for carrying out a punishment shooting of a man who was awaiting sentencing for raping a 15-year-old girl. The RIRA were also blamed for orchestrating rioting in the Ardoyne area of Belfast on 13 July 2009 as an Apprentice Boys parade was passing. Several PSNI officers were injured in the rioting and at least one shot was fired at police. In early November, the Independent Monitoring Commission released a report stating that the threat from the RIRA and other dissident republicans was at its most serious level since the 1998 Good Friday Agreement.

When drug dealer Sean Winters was shot dead in Portmarnock, north Dublin, in September 2010, the Real IRA "emerged as the chief suspects". They were also suspected of shooting dead drugs gang leader Michael Kelly in Coolock in September 2011.

On 5 October 2010, a car bomb exploded outside a branch of the Ulster Bank on Culmore Road in Derry. Two police officers were slightly injured in the blast, which also damaged a hotel and other businesses. Several telephone warnings were received an hour prior to the blast allowing police to cordon off the area. The RIRA later claimed responsibility in a telephone call to the Derry Journal.

A large Real IRA explosives dump and arms cache were discovered in Dunleer, County Louth by Gardaí in October 2010, following a weekend of searches and arrests in the east of the country. In addition, two Real IRA men were charged in Dublin's non-jury Special Criminal Court of membership of an illegal organisation. The Real IRA claimed responsibility for kidnapping and shooting dead of one of their members, Kieran Doherty, for alleged drug dealing. Further seizures of the group's arms and explosives by the Gardaí in 2012 and 2013 led to over a dozen more arrests. In 2011 Michael Campbell, brother of Liam, was found guilty in Vilnius, Lithuania, of trying to purchase arms and explosives and was sentenced to twelve years in prison. In October 2013 Campbell was freed on appeal, only to have the Supreme Court of Lithuania order a retrial in June 2014. Campbell has maintained his innocence, accusing British intelligence of attempting to frame him.

=== Since 2012: merger and beyond ("New IRA") ===
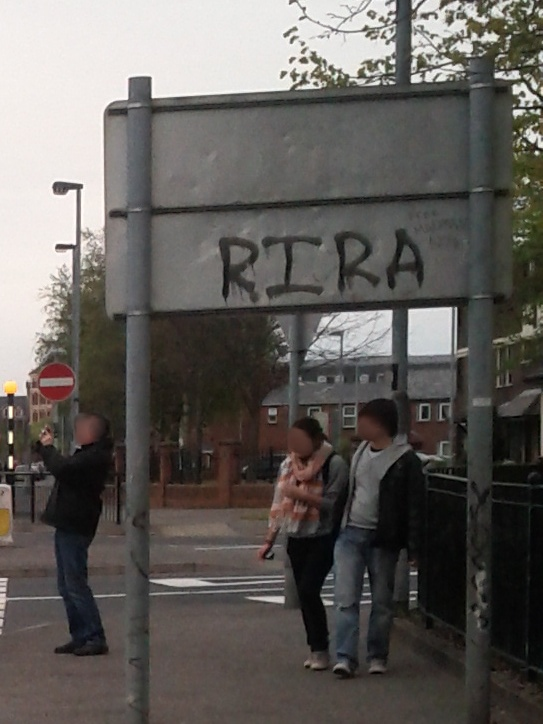
Real IRA graffiti on a road sign in Derry, 2012

On 26 July 2012, it was reported that Republican Action Against Drugs (RAAD) and other small republican militant groups were merging with the Real IRA. As before, the group would continue to refer to itself as "the Irish Republican Army", though some media began to refer to the group as a "new IRA".

== Structure and status ==
The RIRA has a command structure similar to the Provisional IRA, with a seven-member Army Council consisting of a chief of staff, quartermaster general, director of training, director of operations, director of finance, director of publicity, and adjutant general. The rank-and-file members operate in active service units of covert cells to prevent the organisation from being compromised by informers. In June 2005, the organisation was believed to have a maximum of about 150 members, according to a statement by the Irish Minister for Justice, Equality and Law Reform, Michael McDowell.

The RIRA also has political wings: the 32 County Sovereignty Movement (formerly the 32 County Sovereignty Committee), led by Francis Mackey, and unregistered political party Saoradh, led by Brian Kenna.

The RIRA is distinct from the Continuity IRA, another Provisional IRA splinter group founded in 1986, although the two groups have been known to co-operate at a local level. The Provisional IRA has been hostile to the RIRA and issued threats to RIRA members, and in October 2000 was alleged to be responsible for the fatal shooting of Belfast RIRA member Joe O'Connor according to O'Connor's family and 32 County Sovereignty Movement member Marian Price.

Organisations called "Irish Republican Army" are illegal in both UK law and Irish law; both proscriptions have been held to apply to the RIRA as to other groups of the name. Membership in the organisation is punishable by a sentence of up to ten years' imprisonment under UK law. On 16 May 2001, the United States government designated the RIRA (and its aliases) as a "Foreign Terrorist Organization" (FTO). This makes it illegal for Americans to provide material support to the RIRA, requires American financial institutions to freeze the group's assets, and denies suspected RIRA members visas into the United States.

== Funding ==
In 2014, Forbes magazine estimated the group's annual turnover at US$50 million. According to the police in Northern Ireland, the main sources of the Real IRA's funding are illegal fuel operations and various smuggling activities. Illicit cigarettes were also said to be a significant source of income for the group. There are also other significant sources of funding from the group, including funding from sympathisers based in the US and other countries.

== Weaponry ==
The RIRA initially took small amounts of materiel from Provisional IRA arms dumps under the control of McKevitt and other former Provisional IRA members, including the plastic explosive Semtex, Uzi submachine guns, AK-47 assault rifles, handguns, detonators and timing devices. The defection of senior Provisional IRA members also gave the RIRA the ability to manufacture home-made explosives and improvised mortars, including the Mark 15 mortar capable of firing a 200-pound (91 kg) shell.

In 1999, the organisation supplemented its equipment by importing arms from Croatia, including military explosive TM500, CZ Model 25 submachine guns, modified AK-47 assault rifles with a folding stock, and RPG-18 and RPG-22 rocket launchers but a July 2000 attempt to smuggle a second consignment of arms was foiled by Croatian police, who seized seven RPG-18s, AK-47 assault rifles, detonators, ammunition, and twenty packs of TM500.

In 2001, RIRA members travelled to Slovakia to procure arms, and were caught in a sting operation by the British security agency MI5. The men attempted to purchase five tonnes of plastic explosives, 2,000 detonators, 500 handguns, 200 rocket-propelled-grenades, and also wire-guided missiles and sniper rifles. Three men from County Louth were arrested and extradited to the UK and subsequently imprisoned for 30 years each after pleading guilty to conspiring to cause explosions and other charges.

In June 2006, the PSNI made arrests following an MI5 sting operation targeting a dissident republican gun smuggling plot. The RIRA had attempted to procure arms from France including Semtex and C-4 plastic explosives, SA-7 surface-to-air missiles, AK-47s, rocket launchers, heavy machine guns, sniper rifles, pistols with silencers, anti-tank weapons and detonators. On 30 June 2010, two of those arrested were found guilty following a trial by judge in Belfast. On 1 October 2010, one man was sentenced to 20 years' imprisonment for attempting to import weapons and explosives, while the other was sentenced to four years' imprisonment for making a Portuguese property available for the purpose of terrorism.

== See also ==
- List of designated terrorist groups
