= 2001 Ealing bombing =

2001 bombing in Ealing, London, England

2001 Ealing Bombing
- Part of the Dissident Irish Republican campaign
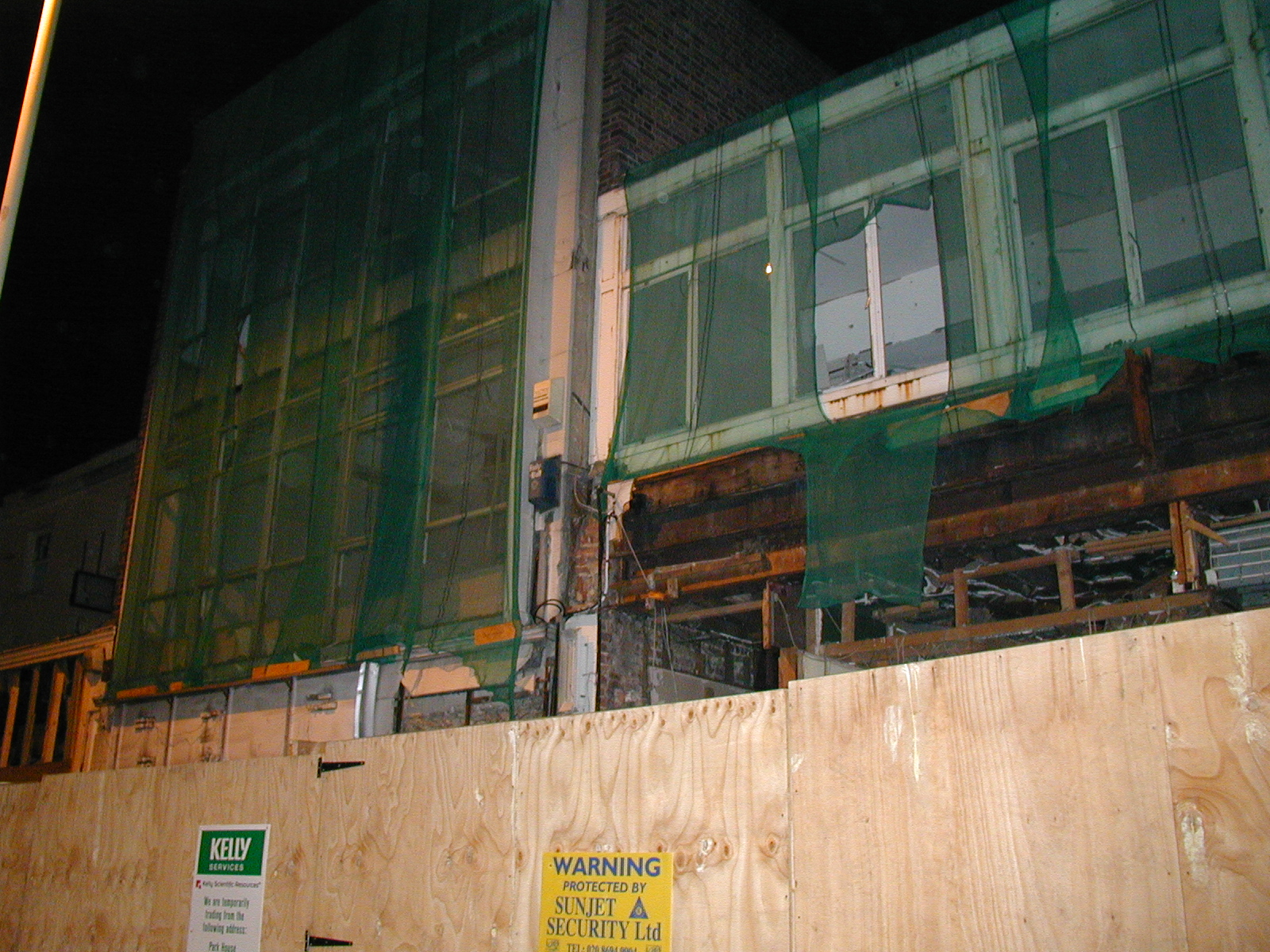
- The damage caused by the bombing, a month after the attack
- Location: 51°30′50″N 0°18′08″W; Ealing, London, United Kingdom
- Date: 3 August 2001; 12:02 am – (UTC+1)
- Target: Ealing Broadway
- Attack type: Car bomb
- Deaths: 0
- Injuries: 7
- Perpetrator: Real IRA

The 2001 Ealing bombing was a bomb attack in Ealing, London, England by the Real Irish Republican Army (RIRA), a splinter group of the Provisional Irish Republican Army (PIRA) that opposed the Good Friday Agreement.

== Bombing ==
On 3 August 2001, the Real IRA, a dissident Irish republican organisation and splinter of the Provisional IRA, detonated a car bomb containing 100 lb (45 kg) of homemade plastic explosives in Ealing Broadway, West London, England. The bomb was in a grey Saab 9000 near the train station, restaurants and pubs on Uxbridge Road, which exploded shortly after midnight, injuring seven people. Debris caused by the bomb spread more than 200 m (220 yd). The bomb was timed to target leaving karaoke pub-goers—but whilst most escaped injury, the explosion still caused significant property damage, estimated to be around £200,000. The adjacent Ealing Broadway shopping centre was also damaged by flooding arising from the water main under the car bomb being ruptured.

Experts regarded the bomb to be designed to look spectacular on CCTV for the purposes of 'armed propaganda' rather than to cause large numbers of injuries. However, anti-terrorist detectives alleged that the attack was planned to be a massacre and to cause as much carnage as the Omagh bombing three years prior.

The bombing was the last successful Irish republican bombing on British soil outside Northern Ireland, where dissidents have waged an armed campaign since the Belfast peace agreement was signed in 1998, ending the Troubles.

== Aftermath and conviction ==
The attack was condemned by Prime Minister Tony Blair, Sinn Féin leader Gerry Adams and others. It also came during a crucial time for the Northern Ireland peace process with disagreements regarding the Provisional IRA's decommissioning process. The attack came months after the Real IRA bombed the BBC Television Centre 3 miles away—a local MP claimed that west London residents felt "cold fury". Two days prior to the attack, a 20 kg Real IRA bomb was discovered at Belfast International Airport. After Ealing, the bombers targeted a new attack on Birmingham on 3 November, but which ultimately failed.

In November 2001, three men—Noel Maguire, Robert Hulme and his brother Aiden Hulme of Dundalk, County Louth—were arrested in connection with the Ealing, BBC and Birmingham bomb attacks. They were all later convicted at the Old Bailey on 8 April 2003. Robert and Aiden Hulme were each jailed for 20 years. Noel Maguire, who the judge said played "a major part in the bombing conspiracy", was sentenced to 22 years.

Two other men, James McCormack, of County Louth, and John Hannan, of Newtownbutler, County Fermanagh, had already admitted the charge at an earlier hearing. McCormack, who played the most serious part of the five, the judge said, was jailed for twenty-two years. John Hannan, who was seventeen at the time of the incidents, was given sixteen years' detention.

== See also ==
- 2000 MI6 attack
- Timeline of the Troubles
- List of terrorist incidents in London
- Colombia Three
