= 2001 BBC bombing =

2001 Real IRA attack on the BBC headquarters in London

4 March 2001 BBC bombing
- Part of the Dissident Irish Republican campaign
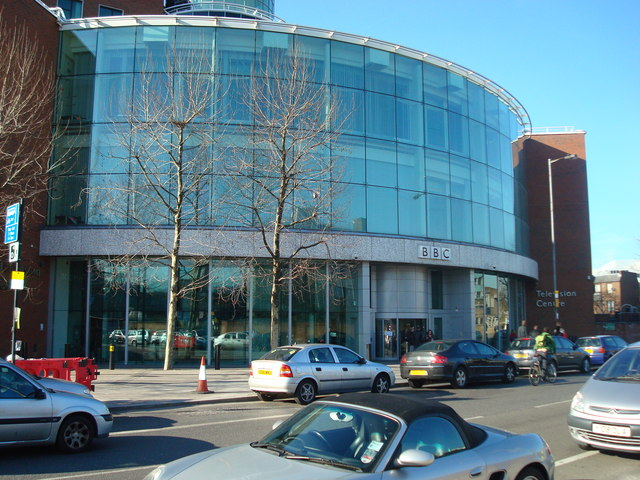
- The BBC Television Centre on Wood Lane
- Location: 51.5113°N 0.2248°W; White City, London, United Kingdom
- Date: 4 March 2001; 12:30 am – (GMT)
- Target: BBC Television Centre
- Attack type: Car bomb
- Deaths: 0
- Injuries: 1
- Perpetrators: Noel Maguire, Robert Hulme, Aiden Hulme, James McCormack and John Hannan

The 2001 BBC bombing was a bomb attack on the BBC's main news centre within BBC Television Centre, on Wood Lane in the White City area of West London.

== History ==
At 12:27 am (0027 UTC) on 4 March 2001, the Real IRA, a dissident Irish republican group, detonated a car bomb outside the BBC's main news centre within BBC Television Centre, on Wood Lane in the White City area of West London.

Between ten and twenty pounds (approximately 4.5 to 9 kilograms) of high explosives had been placed in a red taxi (erroneously identified in early reports as a black taxi). The taxi was purchased on the morning of 3 March in Edmonton, north London, and abandoned yards from the main front door of BBC Television Centre at 11 pm. Police officers were attempting to carry out a controlled explosion on the bomb with a bomb disposal robot when it went off. Staff had already been evacuated after police received a coded warning that had been given to a London hospital and charity one hour before the explosion. There were no fatalities, though one London Underground worker suffered cuts to his eye caused by glass debris.

BBC cameraman Jon Brotherton caught the moment of the explosion and the resulting damage—which included numerous smashed windows in the front entrance—was seen as day broke.

== Conviction ==
The bomb was part of a Real IRA bombing campaign which included the Ealing bombing on 2 August 2001 and an attempted bombing in Birmingham city centre on 3 November 2001. Later in November, three men—Noel Maguire, Robert Hulme, and his brother Aiden Hulme—were arrested in connection with all three bomb attacks. They were convicted at the Old Bailey on 9 April 2003, together with two other men—James McCormack, of County Louth, and John Hannan, of Newtownbutler, County Fermanagh, both of whom had already admitted the charge at an earlier hearing. The Hulme brothers were both jailed for 20 years; Maguire, who the judge said played "a major part in the bombing conspiracy", was sentenced to 22 years; McCormack, who the judge said had played the most serious part of the five, also received 22 years; and Hannan, who was 17 at the time of the incidents, was given 16 years' detention.
