= Seamus McGrane =

Irish dissident republican (1956–2019)

Seamus McGrane (c. 1954 – 25 May 2019) was an Irish dissident republican. He was co-founder of the Real IRA and leader of its splinter group Óglaigh na hÉireann.

== Real IRA ==
McGrane was convicted of Provisional IRA membership in 1976 and imprisoned for a year. As chairman of the Provisional IRA Army Executive, McGrane played a leading role in mounting serious opposition to attempts by Sinn Féin leader Gerry Adams to depart from the original principles of the organisation. He was amongst a number of IRA members who left over acceptance of the Mitchell Principles, which required decommissioning of its arsenal. In November 1997, McGrane joined former IRA quartermaster-general, Michael McKevitt, in forming the hardline Real IRA which opposed the IRA ceasefire. It was one of a number of small dissident republican groups that rejected the Good Friday Agreement and the peace process and were committed to continuing with an armed struggle against what they considered forces of occupation. At the formation of the Real IRA, McGrane was appointed director of training. In 1999 he was arrested training recruits in the use of firearms, during a Real IRA training session for which he was also jailed for four years by the Special Criminal Court. The arrest followed an operation carried out by the Garda Emergency Response Unit.

== Óglaigh na hÉireann ==
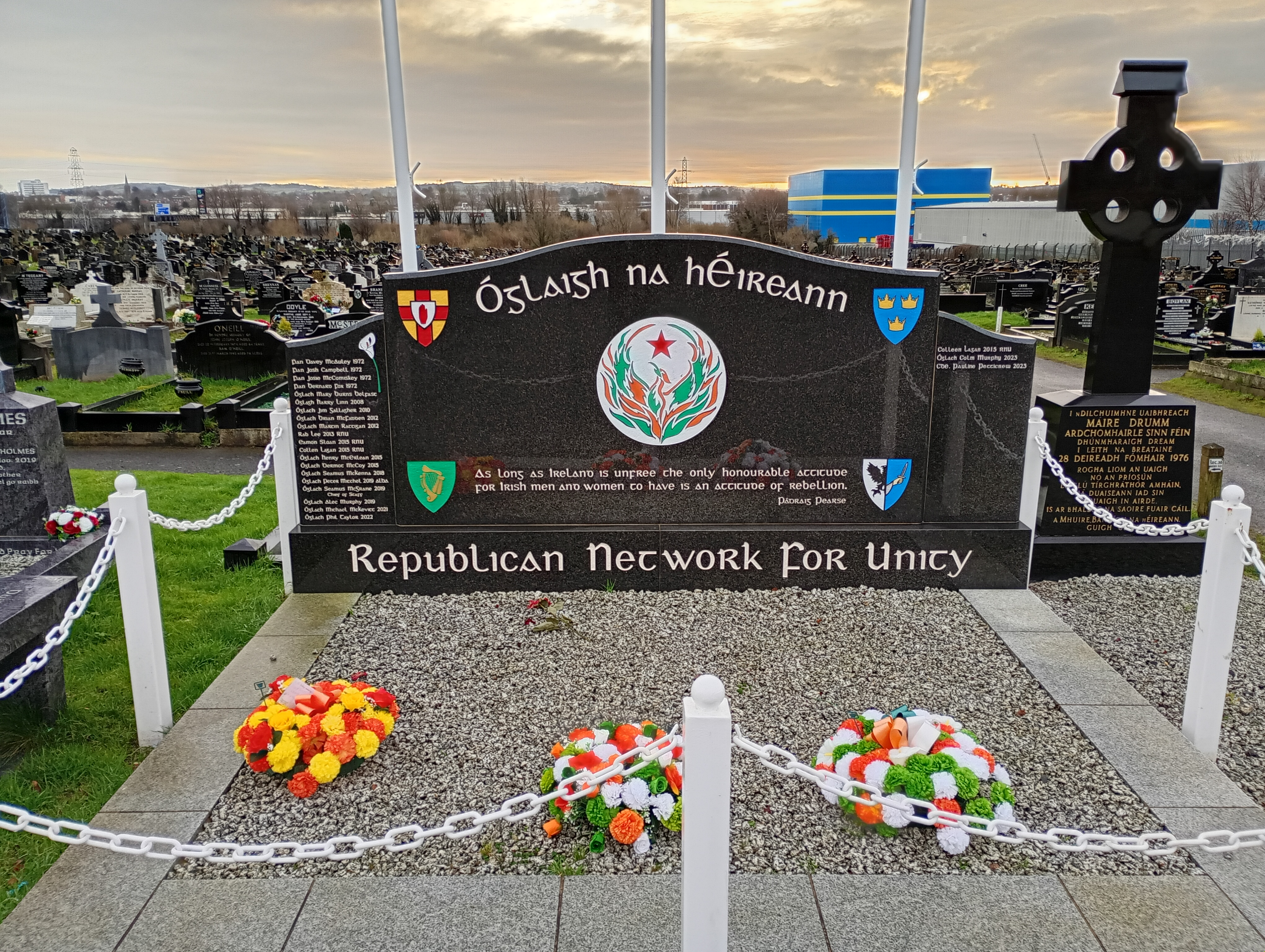
McGrane appears on the Republican Network for Unity memorial in Milltown Cemetery, Belfast

McGrane split from the Real IRA in 2009, leading the splinter group Óglaigh na hÉireann until he was arrested. He was only the second person to be convicted of directing terrorism in the Republic of Ireland. In 2017, at a non-jury three-judge Special Criminal Court sitting in Dublin, McGrane was sentenced to 11 and a half years in prison for directing terrorism and being a member of an illegal organisation. McGrane was convicted of directing the activities of an unlawful organisation between 19 April and 13 May 2015. He was also convicted of being a member of the IRA between January 2010 and May 2015. At his trial the judge ruled that there was "the clearest evidence of directing an illegal organisation" and that "McGrane was leader of a splinter dissident group formed in 2008, known as Óglaigh na hÉireann", which was a distinct entity and operated “in a different capacity” from the Real IRA.

At the time of his final arrest McGrane had allegedly planned a bomb attack in 2015 during Prince Charles' visit to Ireland.

McGrane died in prison on 25 May 2019.
