= Máiría Cahill =

Irish politician and journalist (born 1981)

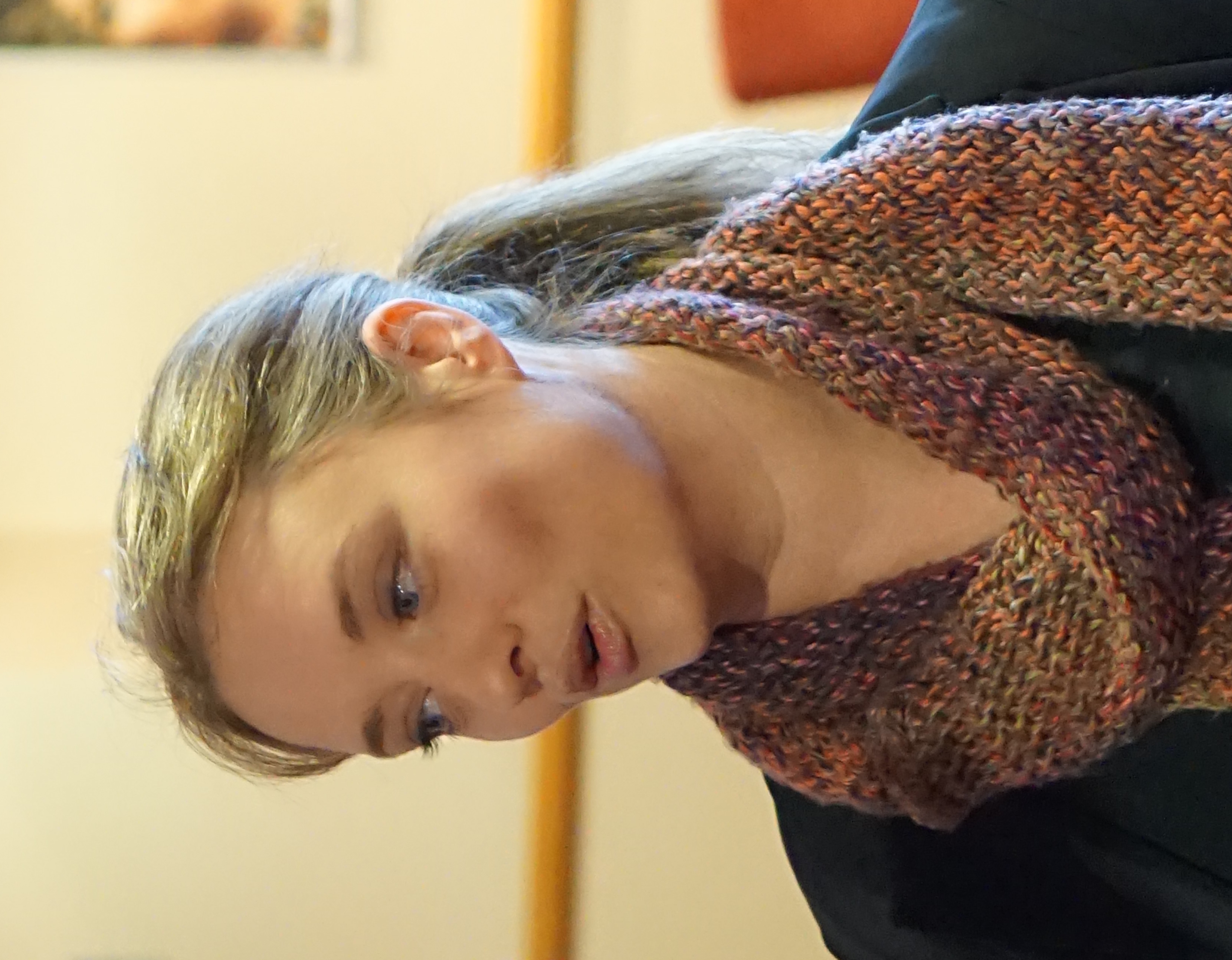
- Cahill in 2014

Lisburn and Castlereagh City Councillor
- In office July 2018 – May 2019
- Constituency: Killultagh

Senator
- In office 13 November 2015 – 8 June 2016
- Constituency: Industrial and Commercial Panel

Personal details
- Born: May 1981 (age 45) Belfast, Northern Ireland
- Party: SDLP (2018–2019); Labour Party (2015–2016)
- Other political affiliations: Sinn Féin (1998–2001); Republican Network for Unity (early 2010)
- Children: 1
- Website: mairiacahill.com

Máiría Cahill (Irish pronunciation: [mˠaːˈɾʲiːə]; born 1981) is an Irish journalist and former politician. In October 2014, she waived anonymity as a complainant in a sexual abuse case to tell of her claims of being sexually abused as a teenager by her uncle-in-law Martin Morris, a Provisional IRA member and allegations of being subjected to an IRA internal investigation which forced her to confront her abuser. The documentary, A Woman Alone with the IRA, prompted a review of Public Prosecution Service conduct in three cases related to Cahill's allegations. In October 2015, the Labour Party announced Cahill had joined the party and she would be its candidate for election to Seanad Éireann. Cahill was elected as a Senator in November 2015 on the first count, with 122 first preferences out of 188 valid votes from Oireachtas members. In July 2018 she joined Northern Ireland's Social Democratic and Labour Party, which she left in November 2019 as a result of its decision not to field a candidate in Belfast North during the 2019 United Kingdom general election.

== Early life and family ==
Cahill was born in 1981 in West Belfast into a prominent republican extended family. Her great-uncle Joe Cahill was one of the founders and chief of staff of the Provisional IRA in the 1970s. She is a cousin of both Siobhán O'Hanlon, a prominent republican activist in the IRA and later in Sinn Féin until her death in 2006, and her sister Eilis O'Hanlon, a political commentator for the Irish Independent and critic of both the IRA and Sinn Féin. Cahill has also claimed her grandfather recruited Gerry Adams into the IRA.

== Public life ==
Cahill was elected National Secretary of Ógra Shinn Féin and worked for Sinn Féin between 1998 and 2001. She sang one song in Arthur MacCaig's 2001 documentary film Song for Ireland, in which she sang 'The Ballad Of Mairéad Farrell' and spoke about the Fleadh (music festival) held annually in Ardoyne.

Cahill was elected National Secretary of the RNU organisation during 2010 but resigned this position and left the organisation.

Cahill joined the Irish Labour Party in 2015 and was a senator from November 2015 to April 2016.

Cahill was an SDLP councillor from July 2018 to April 2019.

=== Rape allegations ===
In January 2010 Cahill went public in a Sunday Tribune interview that, between 1997 and 1998, she had been raped by an IRA member. She was aged 16–17 during this period. In October–November 1999 the IRA started an internal inquiry, which Cahill did not agree with, into the matter, and in March 2000 she was forced to attend a face-to-face confrontation with the IRA member. The "trial" was inconclusive. In July 2000, Cahill learned that two other children in her extended family had also accused the same man of abuse and that the IRA had also interviewed them.

Shortly after her interview with the Sunday Tribune, Cahill reported her allegations to the PSNI, leading to three prosecutions brought against the alleged rapist and those alleged to have been involved in the IRA inquiry. All charges were eventually dropped and the accused rapist acquitted after Ms Cahill withdrew her evidence in May 2014, citing her loss of confidence in the conduct of the prosecutions.

In October 2014, Cahill told of her objections to the IRA inquiry and loss of confidence in the prosecutions in the documentary, A Woman Alone with the IRA. The documentary and public controversy prompted the Director of Public Prosecutions, Barra McGrory QC, to request a review of Public Prosecution Service's (PPS) conduct in the three cases related to Cahill's allegations. The programme has since won several awards for BBC NI Spotlight and reporter Jennifer O'Leary, including the Royal Television Society's Scoop of the Year, and an award from Amnesty International for excellent reporting in its Nations or Regions category.

The former Director of Public Prosecutions (DPP) for England and Wales, Keir Starmer, was appointed to conduct a review of the Cahill cases. He found the Public Prosecution Service had failed all three victims. The Director of Public Prosecutions publicly apologised to Mairia Cahill in May 2015, citing 'I wish to make clear that no fault or blame attaches to Mairia Cahill. The Public Prosecution Service let you down, and for that I am sorry'.

In September 2018, the Northern Ireland Police Ombudsman released a statement saying its report held that in 2000, intelligence received by CID and Special Branch was that 'Martin Morris was abusing children and the IRA were investigating it.' The Chief Constable George Hamilton issued a public apology to Cahill, and the other two victims, as did Sinn Féin leader Mary Lou McDonald. Cahill called McDonald's approach, 'woeful and inadequate.'

=== Leaving Sinn Féin ===
Cahill quit Sinn Féin in 2001 when she moved to America. She later returned and worked on two election campaigns for the party before growing disillusioned at her treatment and leaving for good.

Cahill was in 2010 a member (and National Secretary) of Republican Network for Unity (RNU), an anti-policing political pressure group. Cahill stated she joined while 'at a vulnerable period' of her life and argued against 'outside influences' while a member and left the group.

=== Labour senator ===
In February 2015, Cahill received a James Larkin Thirst for Justice award from the Irish Labour Party. In November 2015, she received a Special Recognition Award in The Irish Tatler's Woman of the Year Awards. Since becoming a public figure, Cahill has written as a political commentator for the Sunday Independent and Belfast Telegraph, both part of the Independent News & Media group. She also writes a fortnightly column for The Irish News and her bylines have appeared in The Sunday Times, The Spectator, and Fortnight magazine.

In October 2015, Labour Party leader Joan Burton announced Cahill had joined the party and she, along with her deputy Alan Kelly, would put her forward as the party's nominee in a by-election to Seanad Éireann's Industrial and Commercial Panel. The by-election had been occasioned by the resignation of Senator Jimmy Harte due to illness. Cahill secured the party's nomination unopposed and won the election in November 2015 on the first count, with 122 first preferences out of 188 valid votes from Oireachtas members.

Cahill was criticised by Senator David Norris for failing to satisfactorily answer questions on her links to dissident republican groups and for failing to take part in media debates with other candidates.

In a March 2016 interview with Catherine Shanahan of the Irish Examiner, Kathleen Lynch, a former Labour Party TD and Minister of state, stated she had no idea as to why Cahill was chosen as the party's by-election candidate.

Cahill did not contest the 2016 Seanad elections.

=== SDLP councillor ===
Cahill was co-opted into an SDLP council seat in Lisburn and Castlereagh council in July 2018. She had to withdraw from the local election campaign in April 2019, due to a law requiring candidates to publish their home addresses. Cahill was unable to do so due to threats made against her.The British Government subsequently apologised.

Cahill, along with the Northern Ireland Human Rights Commission, sued the Secretary of State and the NIO, which resulted in a settlement in January 2021. As part of the court proceedings, the British Government gave a commitment to change the law and did so in June 2020. Candidates are no longer required to publish their home addresses when standing for election.

== Media work ==
She first wrote for the Irish Independent in 2014. She also writes a fortnightly column for The Irish News and a weekly column for the Sunday Independent, interviewing murder suspect Ian Bailey in mid-2020. She has also written for Fortnight and The Spectator magazines also regularly appears as a commentator on radio and television, frequently on the BBC Nolan Show.

Cahill's Number One bestselling memoir Rough Beast was first published by Head of Zeus in September 2023.
