= Lasair Dhearg =

Irish far-left group

- General Secretary: Éamonn Ó Cleirigh
- Founded: 2017
- Ideology: Communism; Anti-imperialism; Irish republicanism
- Political position: Far-left
- Slogan: Time for a Socialist Republic!

Website
- lasairdhearg.com

Lasair Dhearg ([ˈl̪ˠɔsˠəɾʲ ˈjaɾˠəɡ] LOSS-er YAUR-ug, lit. 'Red Flame') is a far-left and dissident Irish republican organisation based in Belfast. It is mainly involved in direct action.

== Ideology ==
Lasair Dhearg describes itself as a republican-socialist organisation striving to create a socialist republic on the island of Ireland. The group campaigns for "the establishment of a 32 County democratic socialist republic built upon the principles of the Proclamation of the Irish Republic of 1916" through armed force. They oppose what they call "Occupied Ireland".

The group is against the Good Friday Agreement and views Sinn Féin as too lenient.

The group supports a living wage, universal healthcare, the promotion of the Irish language and the establishment of a "Socialist Republic of Ireland".

== Activity ==
The group was founded in late 2017/early 2018 in Belfast but did not allow outside members to join until 2020.

In 2018, Lasair Dhearg held a joint event with Anti-Imperialist Action Ireland, which was addressed by video link by Palestinian Marxist militant Leila Khaled, a member of the Popular Front for the Liberation of Palestine. Gilad Erdan petitioned the Irish government not to allow the meeting, noting that Khaled had been convicted of hijacking two passenger planes.

In July 2020, Lasair Dhearg activists, supported by members of Saoradh, the Irish Republican Socialist Party and the Connolly Youth, smashed an Irish Freedom Party stall in Belfast city centre.

In 2022, Lasair Dhearg sent letters to principals of schools in Northern Ireland, warning them against hosting Police Service of Northern Ireland (PSNI) visits. The letters called the police "armed gunmen" and told schools to consult with Lasair Dhearg before inviting police to visit. The letters were criticized as trying to "drag society backwards".

Shortly after the beginning of the Gaza war, in October 2023, Lasair Dhearg activists unfurled a banner at a protest in Derry, calling for the Israeli ambassador to be expelled. It likened Israel to Nazi Germany, and the letters SS mimicked those of the Schutzstaffel. Lasair Dhearg said that Israel is "undeniably fascist". Members also waved the flag of the Popular Front for the Liberation of Palestine.

In October 2024, the organization held its first ardfheis in Belfast.

In November 2024, a sign on the County Donegal border saying "Welcome to Northern Ireland" was changed by Lasair Dhearg activists to say "Welcome to Occupied Ireland".

On 7 October 2025, Lasair Dhearg unfurled a poster outside the Royal Belfast Academical Institution depicting a Palestinian militant with an assault rifle, to commemorate the October 7 attacks on Israel. The poster displayed the words "Palestine has a right to resist".

In February 2026, the group claimed responsibility for a pouring red paint over a statue of Queen Victoria in the grounds of the Royal Victoria Hospital, Belfast. It described her as the "Famine Queen" who oversaw the Great Famine in Ireland. DUP Assembly member Alan Chambers, the party's health spokesman, said hospitals "should never be seen as an opportunity for idiotic political protest or criminal damage. Every pound that now has to be spent repairing this damage is a pound taken away from the health service".

== See also ==
- Anti-Imperialist Action Ireland
- Connolly Youth Movement
- Saoradh
