= Ógra Shinn Féin =

Youth wing of the Irish political party, Sinn Féin

- Founded: c. 1997
- Headquarters: 44 Parnell Square, Dublin 1 and 53 Falls Road, Belfast
- Ideology: Irish republicanism Left-wing nationalism
- Mother party: Sinn Féin

Ógra Shinn Féin (colloquially known as Republican Youth, Irish: Óige Phoblachtach, and formerly, officially known as Sinn Féin Republican Youth, Irish: Sinn Féin Óige Phoblachtach, from 2012 to March 2018) is the youth wing of the Irish political party Sinn Féin. Ógra Shinn Féin is active and organised throughout the island of Ireland.

Upon its establishment in 1997 it was originally known as Sinn Féin Youth; it changed to Ógra Shinn Féin in 1998. A number of Sinn Féin's elected representatives are also members of Ógra Shinn Féin.

== Membership ==
Membership is free and open to all Sinn Féin party members and college society members aged 15 to 29 who support a united Ireland and the establishment of a democratic socialist republic. Following a successful Ógra motion at the 2019 Sinn Féin Ard Fheis, all party members under the age of 26 are automatically Ógra Shinn Féin members and are encouraged to participate in the youth wing.

== Organisation ==
Ógra Shinn Féin is organised in all 32 counties of Ireland, in both local communities and universities. Its structure is similar to that of Sinn Féin. Ógra Shinn Féin cumainn are largely autonomous from local Sinn Féin structures.

- Cumainn - cumainn are organised within a local area or within a college or university. At present there are over 50 active Ógra Shinn Féin cumainn throughout Ireland. A cumainn is required to have a minimum of five members.
- National Youth Committee - the National Committee (Comhairle Náisiúnta) is the democratically elected governing body of Ógra Shinn Féin. It consists of between 21 members. Half of the National Youth Committee will be elected by activists at an annual conference, and half will be selected by those elected already in place. The chair of the National Youth Committee is now elected by delegates at a national congress, having previously been appointed by the party chair.

== Campaigns and issues ==
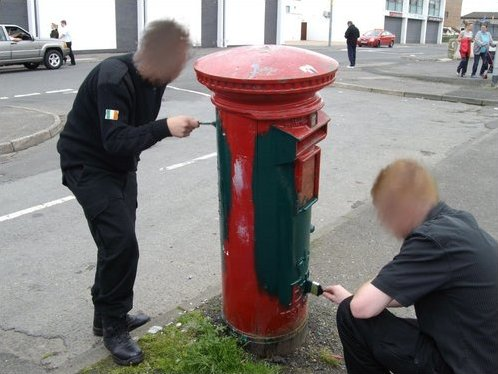
Members of Ógra Shinn Féin in Derry 2008 painting a Royal Mail postbox as part of the Green Post-Box Campaign.

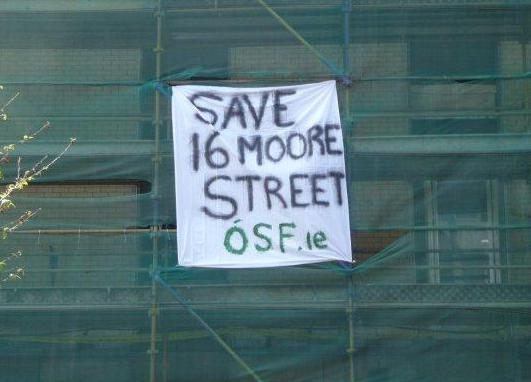
An Ógra Shinn Féin banner drop on O'Connell Street in April 2009, as part of the Save 16 Moore Street campaign

The long-term aim of Ógra Shinn Féin is "to recruit young dedicated activists to ensure the continuity and successful conclusion of the struggle" to establish a 32-county democratic socialist republic.

Specific issues of primary importance include: Irish unity and independence; workers' rights; the protection of the environment; an end to sectarianism and racism in Ireland; decent housing for the people; weekend elections and referendums; education; supporting the Shell to Sea campaign, voting age to be lowered to 16; and the promotion of the Irish language (Gaeilge).

The following is a list of some campaigns which Ógra Shinn Féin has been involved in:

- Educate to be Free Campaign - This campaign was launched in December 2008 and calls for free education for all. It also calls for an increase in Irish language education and for student empowerment and radicalizing students unions.
- Green Postbox Campaign - This campaign was launched in 2008 and involved young republicans in Northern Ireland painting postboxes green (postboxes in the Republic of Ireland are green while those in Northern Ireland are red). The campaign received severe criticism from Unionist politicians such as Jim Wells. It is alleged that hundreds of postboxes were painted throughout Northern Ireland. Although this campaign was officially launched in 2008, it had been common for ÓSF members and other Irish republicans to engage in this practice. In 2006, a Tyrone ÓSF member was arrested for painting a postbox in Fintona.
- National Suicide Prevention Campaign - In 2006 Ógra Shinn Féin launched a nationwide suicide prevention campaign. The campaign focuses on the dissemination of information and the demand for an all-Ireland approach to suicide awareness.
- ARISE - In 2007 Ógra Shinn Féin launched the Anti-Racism, Imperialism, Sectarianism and Exploitation (ARISE) campaign.
- Other campaigns - It is/was also involved in campaigns regarding Demilitarization, Anti-Collusion, Disband the Royal Ulster Constabulary/Proper Policing, Minimum Wage, Lower Car Insurance, A President for All, Gay Rights, Re-routing Orange Order marches, "Freedom for the POW's", "Bring them home" (Colombia Three), anti-occupation of Iraq, remembering "Irish martyrs", Irish language, Shell to Sea, Save 16 Moore Street and All Ireland mobile tariff.
- In August 2016 Sinn Féin youth activists staged a protest outside of Fine Gael Headquarters due to their decision to use tax-payers' money to appeal the European Commission's decision to force Apple Inc. to hand over €13 billion in unpaid taxes to the state. The protest involved dumping dozens of apples on the doorstep of the building as well as impaling apples on the railings.

== Recent events ==
Sinn Féin Republican Youth members with Sinn Féin President Mary Lou McDonald and the late Martin McGuinness at Máirtín Ó Muilleoir's Westminster election launch in February 2015.

As part of the transformation of the Provisional Republican Movement to reflect changing realities brought about by the peace process, a decision was taken to change the logo, and at the 2004 National Congress the green star and orange graffiti-style logo was adopted. The logo was again changed at the 2006 Congress when the current logo, incorporating the words Ógra Shinn Féin, the Starry Plough, the Sunburst Flag and the "Freedom Lark" was adopted. In 2014 Ógra Sinn Féin was criticised by the Young Unionists for failing to remove the petrol bomb logo from a number of its wall murals.

== Affiliations ==
- National Youth Council of Ireland (NYCI) - Ógra Shinn Féin was previously a full member of the National Youth Council of Ireland.
- European Network of Democratic Young Left (ENDYL) - Ógra Shinn Féin was a full member of the ENDYL until its dissolution.

=== International ===
Ógra Shinn Féin has strong connections with a number of pro-independence and socialist groups throughout the world, including:

- SEGI - A Basque nationalist party that forms part of the Basque National Liberation Movement and is aligned with Langile Abertzaleen Batzordeak, Batasuna and the militant organisation ETA. SEGI is proscribed as a terrorist organisation by the Spanish and French authorities. ÓSF frequently send delegations to the Basque Country It has been reported in the Spanish media that the Spanish security services are monitoring both groups closely and have noticed a sharp increase in co-operation between the two. Spanish papers have also claimed that the youth wings exchange IRA and ETA knowledge and information.
- Ghjuventù Indipendentista - A youth movement which supports Corsican Nationalism and advocates independence from France. An ÓSF delegation attend the "Scontri Internaziunali" which is held in the town of Corte in central Corsica every year.
- Jovent Republicà - The youth wing of the Catalan nationalist group Republican Left of Catalonia which campaigns for the independence of Catalonia from Spain.
- Others - ÓSF also supports nationalist movements in Kanaky (New Caledonia), Kabylie (Algeria), Galicia, Spain, Scotland, Sardinia and Brittany.

== Notable members and former members ==
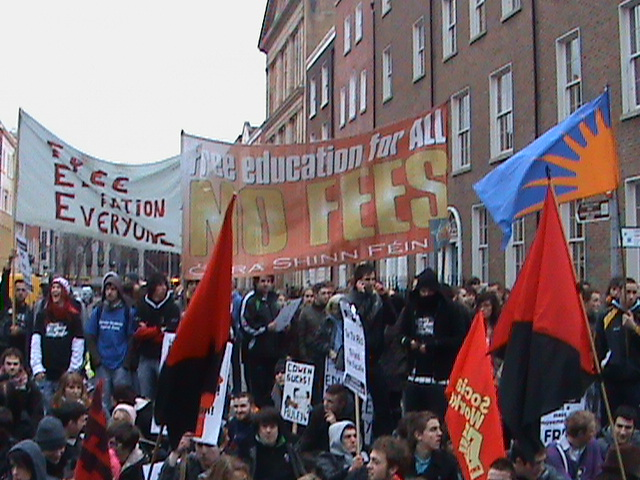
Members of Ógra Shinn Féin (along with SWN and WSM) protesting against the reintroduction of college fees, Dublin, February 2009. Note the use of the sunburst flag, a symbol of Fianna Éireann

- Pearse Doherty – Current TD representing Donegal and former Senator, served as a member of the ÓSF National Executive.
- Máiría Cahill – Former ÓSF National Secretary. Cahill was served as a Senator from 2015 to 2016 for the Labour Party, and selected as an SDLP member of Lisburn and Castlereagh City Council in 2018.
- Toiréasa Ferris – Elected to Kerry County Council and candidate for Sinn Féin in the European Parliament Elections in 2009.
- Eoin Ó Broin – Current TD representing Dublin Mid-West. Sinn Féin Director of European Affairs. He is also a published author and a former National Organiser of Sinn Féin Youth.
- Daithí McKay – Former Sinn Féin MLA for North Antrim and political commentator.
- Jonathan O'Brien – Sinn Féin TD representing Cork North-Central.
- Niall Ó Donnghaile – Sinn Féin councillor representing East Belfast, and Sinn Féin Assembly Press Officer. Lord Mayor of Belfast (2011–12). Seanadóir in the Seanad Éireann.
- David Cullinane – Current TD representing Waterford. Former Senator and previous member of Waterford City Council.
- Matt Carthy – Sinn Féin TD representing Cavan–Monaghan.
- Megan Fearon – Former Sinn Féin MLA for Newry and Aramgh.
- Emma Sheerin - Sinn Féin MLA for Mid Ulster.
- Fintan Warfield - Sinn Féin Seanadóir in the Seanad Éireann and former National Chair of Ógra Shinn Féin.

== National Chairs ==
Sinn Féin Youth members in South Armagh 1997

- Eoin Ó Broin – 1997–98
- Matt Carthy – 1998–2000
- Damian Lawlor – 2000–02 (Author of Na Fianna Éireann and the Irish Revolution - 1909 to 1923)
- Chris O'Ralaigh – 2002–03
- Mickey Bravender – 2003–06
- Barry McColgan – 2006–09
- Donnchadh Ó Laoghaire – 2009–2011
- Darren O'Rourke – 2011–2014
- Harry Connolly – 2014–2016
- Fintan Warfield – 2016–2018
- Aodhán Ó hAdhmaill – 2018–2019 (First chair elected by membership at a National Congress)
- Caoimhín McCann – 2019–2022

== Publications ==
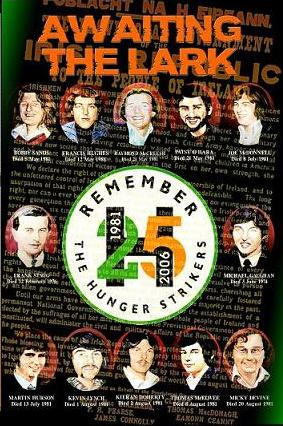
The front cover of Awaiting the Lark written and published by Sinn Féin Republican Youth

Ógra Shinn Féin publishes a quarterly republican youth magazine entitled Splanc. The magazine was launched in 2001, eventually ceasing publication around 2006. It was re-launched in 2007, primarily in online format, with the same name, Splanc (which is the Irish language translation of Spark).

ÓSF has published its own book Awaiting the Lark in 2006 to mark the 25th Anniversary of the 1981 Irish hunger strike. The book includes interviews with many well known Irish republicans such as Michelle Gildernew, Barry McElduff, Sean Crowe, Seanna Walsh and Martina Anderson. It includes photographs from the funerals of the hunger strikers and protests that took place around the time. The book also includes information about Michael Gaughan and Frank Stagg who died on hunger strike in 1974 and 1976 respectively.

== Notable actions and incidents ==
Ógra Shinn Féin frequently attracts media attention or causes controversy due to some of its activities.

Some notable examples include:

- Arrests at Belfast City Hall 1997 - On 3 November 1997 three members of ÓSF were arrested after they scaled the front of Belfast City Hall and unfurled a banner calling for the release of political prisoners. This was part of the "Saoirse" campaign. The RUC special branch later allegedly attempted to recruit one of those arrested to serve as an informant.
- Alleged abuse by Gardaí in Store Street 1998 - In November 1998 seven members of ÓSF were arrested by Gardaí in Dublin for allegedly acting in an abusive manner. While being held in Store Street Garda station the activists alleged that they were kicked and beaten by Gardaí. A protest which took place outside the Garda Station that night resulted in skirmishes between demonstrators and the Gardaí.
- UCC Riot 1999 - In November 1999, 50 gardaí were called in to reinforce University College Cork security after a melee broke out in the corridors of the Science building. Members of Ógra Shinn Féin, the Socialist Party, Workers' Party and anti-fascist groups had attempted to force their way into a lecture hall where British writer and Holocaust denier David Irving was to hold a talk. Gardaí decided to baton charge the 600 strong crowd.
  Protest outside Crossmaglen British Army (1999)
- South Armagh demilitarization riots 2001 - In December 2001 ÓSF was blamed for carrying out petrol bomb attacks against RUC and British army bases in south Armagh. Twenty-two police officers, three soldiers and two police dogs were injured in the incidents during which protesters attacked the watchtowers at Creevekeeran and Drummuckaval with iron bars, bottles, fireworks and petrol bombs. Two soldiers suffered serious head injuries after being hit with petrol bombs and had to be airlifted to hospital. Another soldier suffered serious burns. The barracks at Crossmaglen was attacked and protesters managed to smash through the main gate after igniting an oil barrel and pushing it into the entrance.
- Attack on SDLP councillor's office - In January 2002, SDLP councillor P. J. Bradley claimed members of ÓSF were responsible for an attack on his offices in Warrenpoint during which eleven windows were smashed and paint was poured over the building and in through the windows. Caitríona Ruane disputed Bradley's comments.
- Attack on Rosslea PSNI station 2002 - On 1 July 2002 ÓSF was blamed for an organised attack against Rosslea PSNI station. Up to 50 masked youths threw stones and bottles at the police station causing extensive damage to the exterior of the building. The Unionist Newsletter described the attack as "appalling" and condemned ÓSF for "laying vicious siege" to Rosslea PSNI Station.

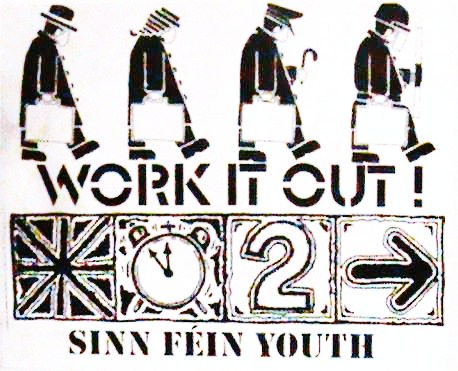
"Britain, It's Time 2 Go" sticker

- Sit-in at British Tourist office in Dublin 2003 - In May 2003, six members of ÓSF staged a sit-in in the British Tourist office in Dublin, in protest at the decision by the British government to postpone the elections in Northern Ireland. A picket in support of the protest was held outside.
- ÓSF banned from Trinity College 2005 - Sinn Féin had been banned from organising in Trinity College Dublin until the ban was overturned in 1999. In 2005, it was temporarily re-instated (until the end of the college term) after the chairperson of the TCD Ógra Shinn Féin cumann forwarded an email on to others which included threatening remarks towards former British Prime Minister Baroness Thatcher.

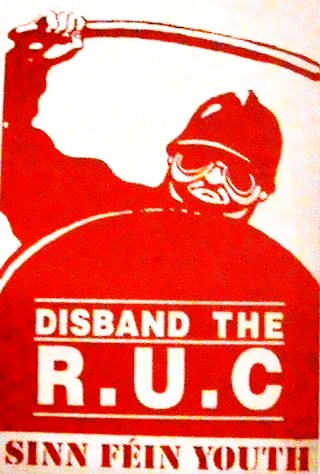
ÓSF sticker calling for the Royal Ulster Constabulary to be disbanded

- 1916 Auction Protest 2006 - In April 2006 members of ÓSF disrupted a sale of memorabilia associated with the Easter Rising of 1916 at James Adams & Sons Auctioneers on Stephen's Green, Dublin. Two activists were arrested by Gardaí but were later released without charge. The protest was the lead story on a number of News broadcasts including TV3 News.
- Down Orange hall incident 2007 - In September 2007, ÓSF was heavily criticised after one of its members was taken to hospital following a fall from the roof of an Orange hall. The member had been removing a Union Flag from the roof. This incident occurred at a time when Orange halls in the area had been subjected to firebomb and arson attacks. Some people claimed that removing the flag was anti-sectarian and should be applauded.
- Green Postbox campaign 2008 onwards - One campaign undertaken by ÓSF involved changing the colour of Royal Mail postboxes in Northern Ireland from red to green (green is the standard colour of postboxes in the Republic of Ireland). Sinn Féin MLA Barry McElduff described the campaign as "peaceful political statement". Other politicians claimed this amounted to the MLA condoning criminal damage. It is believed hundreds of postboxes were painted green in such republican heartlands as Derry, Strabane and West Tyrone alone.
- Occupation of Green Party offices 2008 - On 4 December 2008, a number of ÓSF members took part in a protest organised by the student based "Free Education for Everyone" (FEE) group. A number of protesters were arrested after they occupied the offices of Paul Gogarty, Green Party Spokesperson on Education, in Lucan, Dublin. Gardaí were forced to break down the door of the office and arrested ten of the activists.
- Gregory Campbell incident 2009 - ÓSF were criticised for comparing East Londonderry MP Gregory Campbell to Nazi propaganda minister Joseph Goebbels on its blog. An accompanying edited image on the site showed Campbell's head superimposed on the body of a man wearing a Nazi uniform. The article criticised Campbell's NI Executive culture portfolio and his stance on the Irish language.
- PSNI recording incident 2009 - In January 2009 a member of ÓSF in Omagh was arrested following a confrontation in the town. While at the police station, a constable attempted to recruit the man as an informant. The ÓSF member managed to record the incident on his cellphone. The incident has been brought before Omagh DPP and is currently under investigation by the Police Ombudsman. The recording of the incident was uploaded to YouTube.
- Warrenpoint visit 2009 - On 10 January 2009 ÓSF held a Republican Youth weekend in Newcastle, County Down. Part of the weekend involved a trip to the site of the Warrenpoint Ambush where an IRA unit ambushed and killed 18 British soldiers in 1979. Protesters including Willie Frazer and Jim Wells branded the trip an "insult to victims". Loyalist victims campaigner Willie Frazer said "10 years ago the world hoped that they had moved on from terrorism but as the last few days have shown they still firmly believe in armed conflict". The local ÓSF spokesperson claimed it was simply part of a historical tour of the County Down area.
- Belfast dinner dance 2009: In January 2010 the Sunday World (Northern Ireland edition) ran a full-page article which criticized ÓSF for hosting a "Pro-IRA event" in a hotel in Belfast City Centre. The paper also claimed that there were numerous chants of "F*** the Brits" and "You'll never ever beat the IRA". According to ÓSF the event was a celebration of 100 years of Na Fianna Éireann with the families of dead Fians in attendance and traditional Irish Rebel music.
- Government protests 2010: On 22 November 2010 ÓSF members took part in protests against the International Monetary Fund bail-out. During a protest outside government buildings in Dublin one member of ÓSF was injured and taken to hospital after he was struck by a ministerial car during a sit-down protest. Scuffles also broke out with police. In Cork, Ógra Shinn Féin occupied the offices of Fianna Fáil councillors in Cork City hall protesting against the selling out of Irish sovereignty to the European Union and the IMF.
- Israel embassy protest 2012: On 15 November 2012, two members of Ógra Shinn Féin were arrested during a protest outside the Israeli embassy in Dublin. Gardaí batoned activists who were taking part in a sit-down protest on the road in opposition to the Israeli bombing of Gaza as part of its Operation Pillar of Cloud.

== See also ==
- Sinn Féin
