= IRPWA =

Irish republican organisation which supports republican prisoners

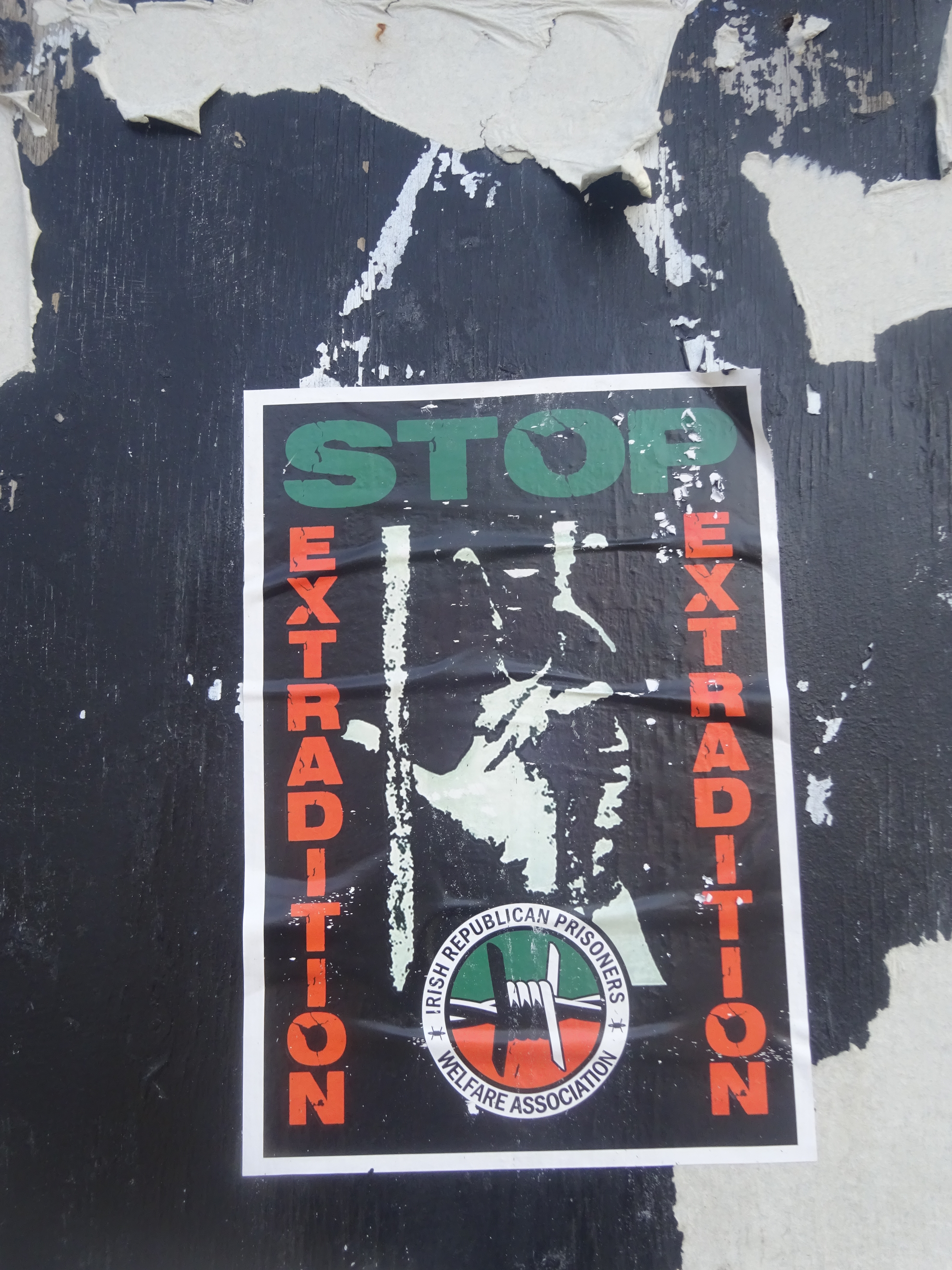
IRPWA poster in Dublin

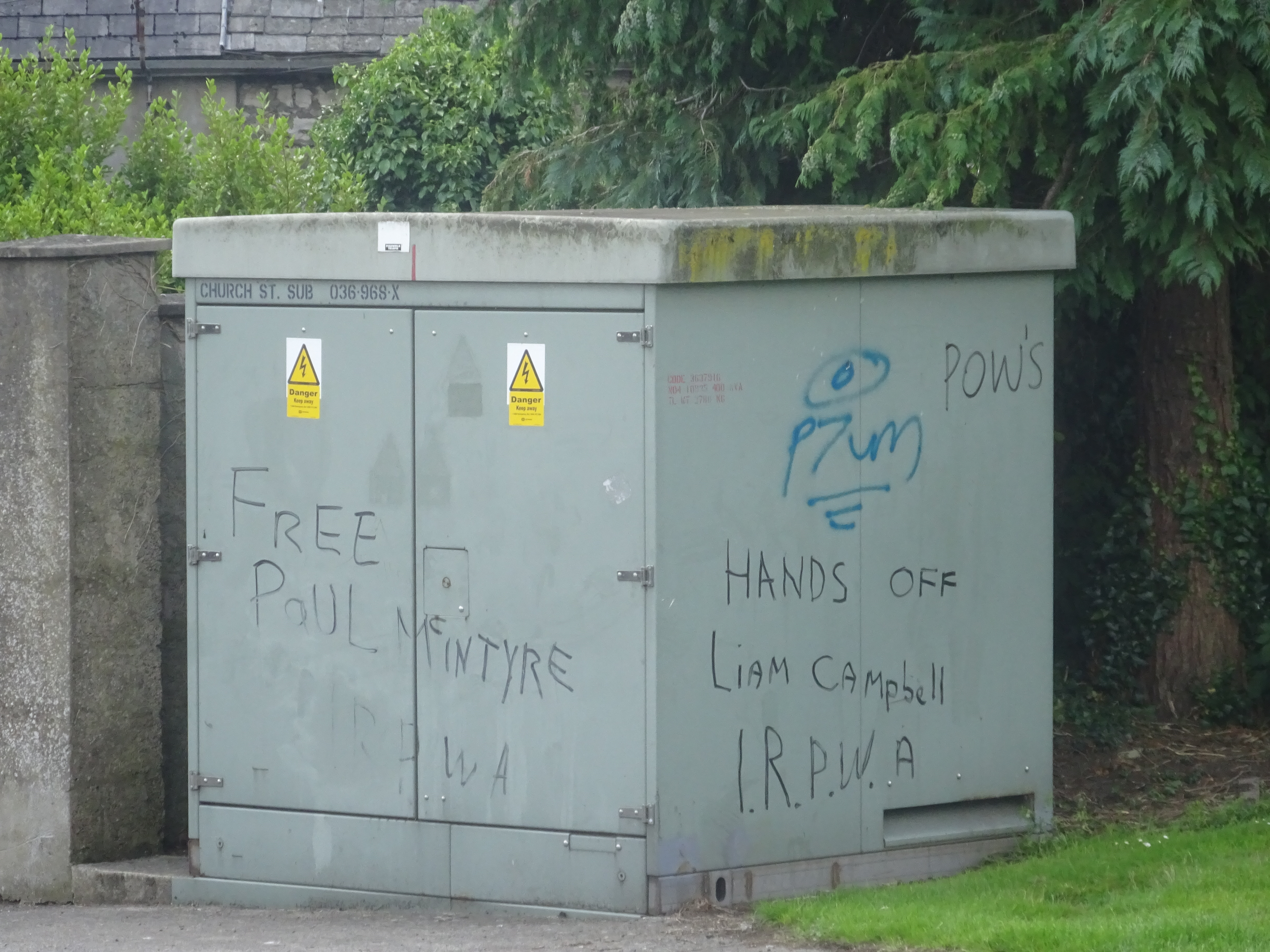
Graffiti in Limerick in support of the IRPWA, of Liam Campbell, and of Paul McIntyre (accused in the shooting of Lyra McKee).

The Irish Republican Prisoners Welfare Association (IRPWA) is an Irish republican organisation which supports republican prisoners. It has ties with the political party Saoradh and the 32 County Sovereignty Movement.

In May 2016 an unknown member of the IRPWA interrupted a ceremony to commemorate British soldiers who were killed during the Easter Rising. In response the Canadian ambassador to Ireland Kevin Vickers grabbed him and dragged him away. The event gained international attention.

In October 2016 the DUP criticised the organisation, saying it was promoting violence, in response to a mural at an IRPWA office saying "unfinished revolution" with two republican paramilitaries.
