= Starry Plough =

Irish political flag

Irish Citizen Army
- Other names: The Starry Plough, Plough and Stars flag
- Use: Other
- Adopted: 1914
- Design: A yellow plough with a sword for a coulter outlined in black with seven silver stars forming the Big Dipper outlined in black.
- Designed by: William H. Megahy or George William Russell

The Starry Plough banner (Irish: An Camchéachta, lit. 'the bent plough') is a flag which was originally used by the Irish Citizen Army, a socialist Irish republican movement, in 1914, and subsequently adopted by other Irish political organisations.

== Composition ==
The original Starry Plough was designed by William H. Megahy, though the concept may have originated with George William Russell, for the Irish Citizen Army and showed silver stars on a green background. The flag depicts an asterism (an identifiable part of a constellation) of the constellation Ursa Major, called The Plough (or "Starry Plough") in Ireland and Britain, the Big Dipper in North America, and various other names worldwide. Two of the Plough's seven stars point to Polaris, the North Star. James Connolly, co-founder of the Irish Citizen Army with Jack White and James Larkin, said the significance of the banner was that a free Ireland would control its own destiny from the plough to the stars. The sword as the coulter is also a biblical reference in Isaiah 2:3-4. In the Bible verse, God pushes his followers to turn their weapons into tools, turning the means for war into the means for peace. The marriage of Catholic tradition, the biblical reference being integral to the flag's design, with socialist concepts, like the working class and the oppressor forcing them to take up their ploughshares as arms, leaves the Starry Plough flag with complex and nuanced implications that are susceptible to a wide range of interpretations.

== History ==
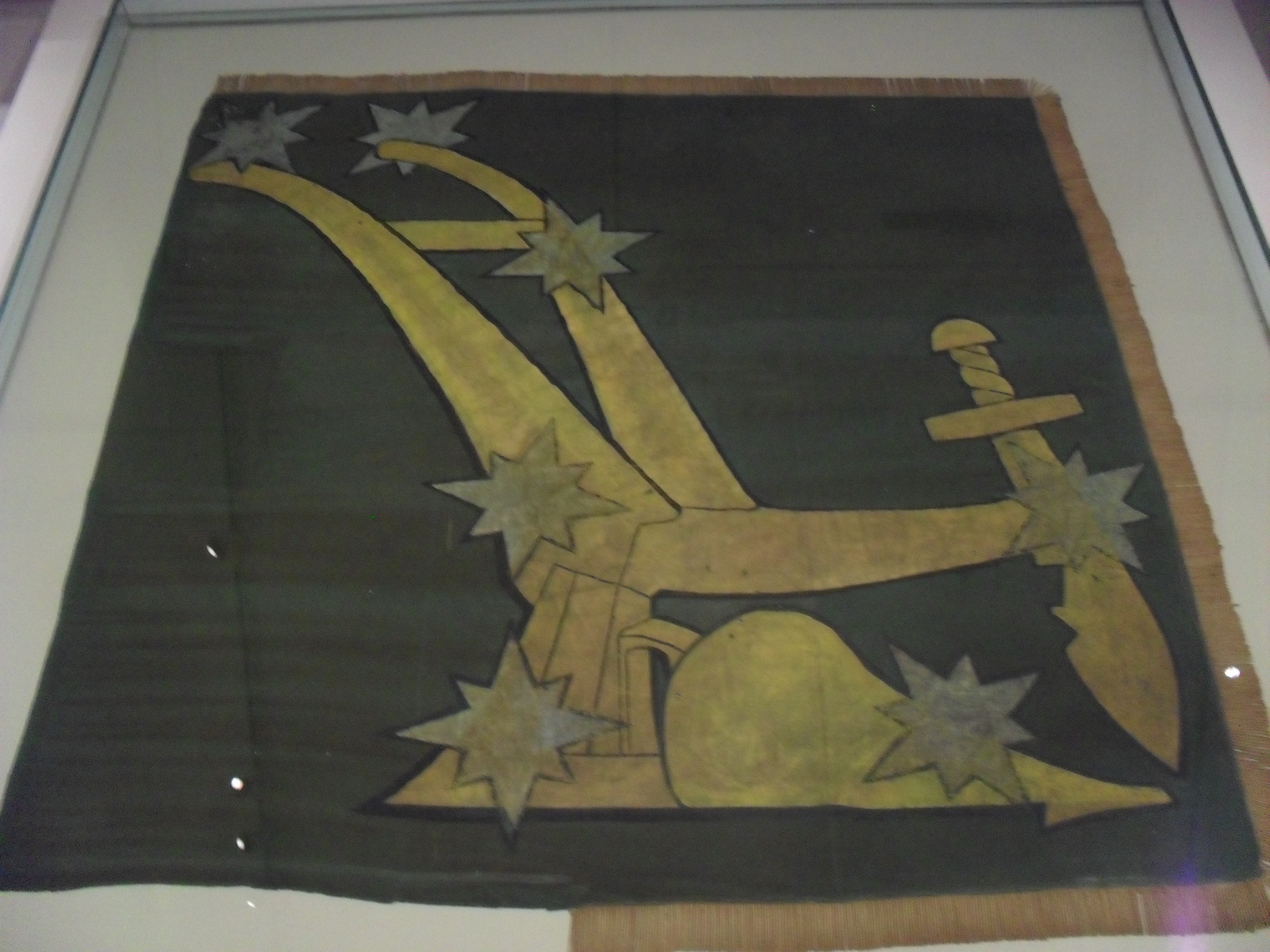
Original 1914 Starry Plough.

The original Starry Plough was unveiled on 5 April 1914 and flown over the Imperial Hotel by the Irish Citizen Army during the 1916 Easter Rising. The 1916 flag is on display at the National Museum, Collins Barracks, in Dublin.

At public performances of The Plough and the Stars, the Seán O'Casey play which takes its name from the flag, riots were known to break out when the Starry Plough appeared.

During the 1930s the design changed to a blue banner which was designed by members of the Republican Congress, and was adopted as the emblem of the Irish Labour movement, including the Labour Party. Labour adopted the rose as its official emblem in 1991 but continued to use the Starry Plough for ceremonial occasions, and in 2021 the party reverted to using the Starry Plough as their primary symbol (this time with white stars on a red background). It is also used by Irish republicans and has been carried alongside the Irish tricolour and Irish provincial flags and the sunburst flag, as well as the red flag at Provisional IRA, Continuity IRA, Real IRA, Official IRA, Irish People's Liberation Organisation and Irish National Liberation Army rallies and funerals.

The flag, and alternative versions of it, are also used by Saoradh, Éirígí, the Connolly Youth Movement, Republican Sinn Féin, Labour Youth, Ógra Shinn Féin, Communist Party of Ireland, the Republican Socialist Youth Movement, and socialist Celtic F.C. supporters. In the past it was used by the Sligo–Leitrim Independent Socialist Organisation before it merged with the Irish Labour Party. The flag was draped on the coffin of the Independent TD Tony Gregory during his funeral.

The older banner featuring the plough is still occasionally used today by the Irish Republican Socialist Party, Sinn Féin and the Workers' Party (formerly known as Official Sinn Féin).

While similar to the flag of the US state of Alaska, it predates the latter by more than a decade.

In Northern Ireland, the flag is often burned by loyalist activists in protest.

== Gallery ==
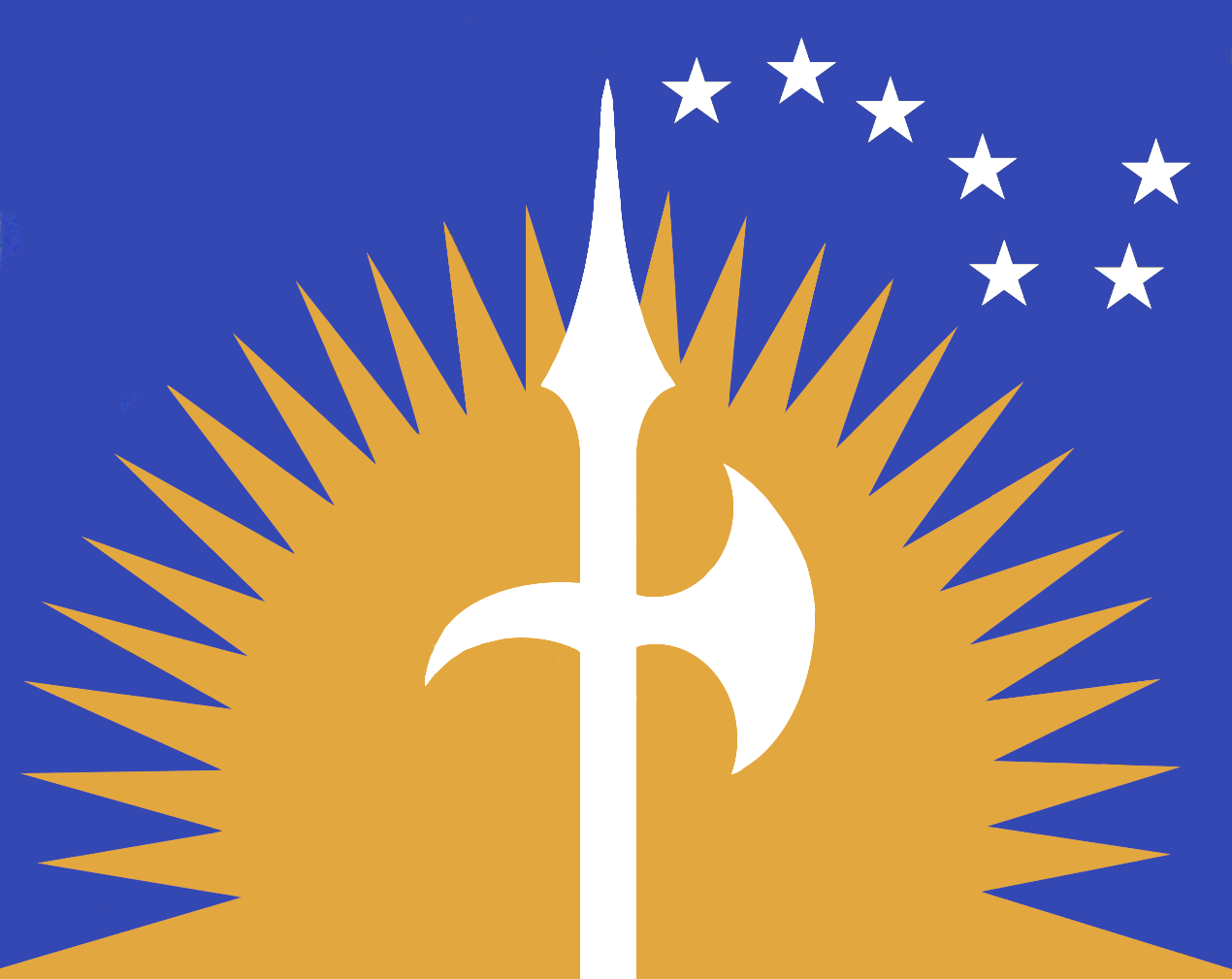
A version of the sunburst flag with the Starry Plough and a pike, associated with the United Irishmen. The flag may have been used by the 26th Battalion of the National Army.

Modern variant of the Starry Plough flag

Modern dark blue variant used by the Irish National Liberation Army

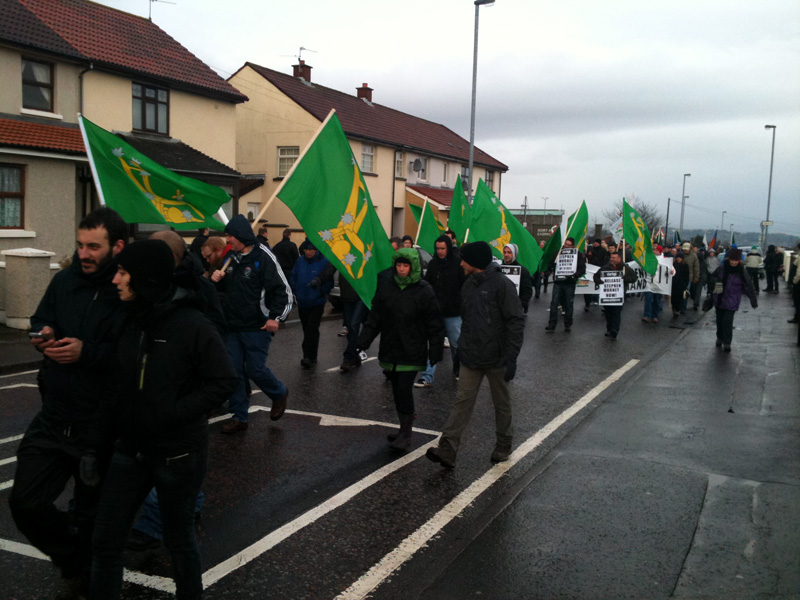
Members of the socialist political party Éirígí carry facsimile-Starry Plough flags in Derry, January 2013

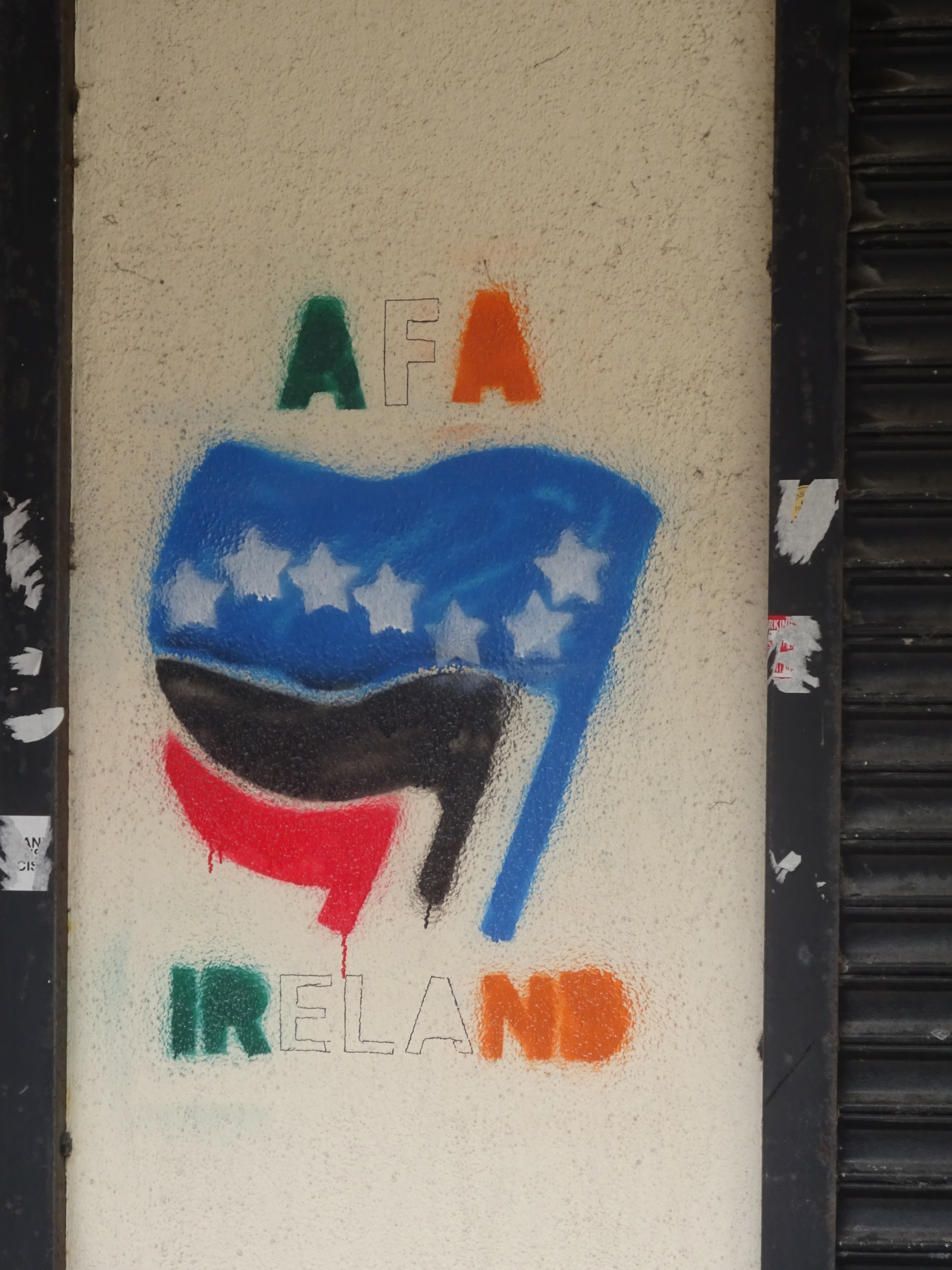
Starry Plough on a modern anti-fascist graffito, Longford

The 2021 version of the Labour Party logo incorporates the Starry Plough symbology

== See also ==
- The Plough and the Stars, the play by Seán O'Casey (1926)
- Flag of Alaska (a similar design)
- Plough flag (a similar design)
- Otava flag (a similar design)
- Sunburst flag (another Irish nationalist flag)
- Communist symbolism
