= Dissident republican =

Irish republicans opposed to the 1998 peace agreement that ended the Troubles

Dissident republicans (Irish: poblachtach easaontach) are Irish republicans who do not support the Northern Ireland peace process. The peace agreements followed a 30-year conflict known as the Troubles, in which more than 3,500 people were killed and 47,500 injured, and in which republican paramilitary groups such as the Provisional Irish Republican Army waged a campaign to bring about a united Ireland. Negotiations in the 1990s led to a Provisional IRA ceasefire in 1994 and to the Good Friday Agreement of 1998. Mainstream republicans, represented by Sinn Féin, supported the Agreement as a means of achieving Irish unity peacefully. Dissidents saw this as an abandonment of the goal of an independent Irish republic and acceptance of partition. They hold that the Northern Ireland Assembly and Police Service of Northern Ireland (PSNI) are illegitimate and see the PSNI as a British paramilitary police force.

Some dissident republican political groups, such as Republican Sinn Féin and the 32 County Sovereignty Movement, support political violence against the British security forces and oppose the Provisional IRA's 1994 ceasefire; other groups, such as the Irish Republican Socialist Party, wish to achieve their goals only through peaceful means.

Since the IRA ceasefire, splinter groups have continued an armed campaign against the British security forces in Northern Ireland. Like the Provisional IRA, each of these groups sees itself as the only rightful successor of the original IRA and each calls itself simply "the IRA", or Óglaigh na hÉireann in Irish (see also Irish republican legitimism).

== Groups currently described as dissident republican ==
=== Paramilitary ===
- Arm na Poblachta (ANP)
- Continuity Irish Republican Army (Continuity IRA)
- Cumann na mBan
- Fianna Éireann
- Irish Republican Liberation Army (IRLA)
- Irish Republican Movement (IRM)
- New Irish Republican Army (New IRA)
- Óglaigh na hÉireann (ONH)

=== Political ===
- 32 County Sovereignty Movement (32CSM)
- Anti-Imperialist Action Ireland (AIA)
- Glór na hÓglaigh (GNH, lit. 'Voice of the Volunteers')
- Irish Republican Prisoners' Welfare Association (IRPWA)
- Irish Republican Resistance (IRR)
- Irish Republican Socialist Party (IRSP)
- Lasair Dhearg
- Republican Network for Unity (RNU)
- Republican Sinn Féin (RSF)
- Saoradh

== Groups previously described as dissident republican ==
=== Paramilitary ===
- Irish National Liberation Army (INLA) (Armed campaign ended in 2009)
- Real Irish Republican Army (Real IRA) (merged into the New IRA in 2012)
- Republican Action Against Drugs (RAAD) (merged into the New IRA in 2012)

=== Political ===
- Irish Republican Voice (IRV) (disbanded 2014)
