= Sunburst flag =

Early flag associated with Irish nationalism

Traditional variation of the sunburst flag

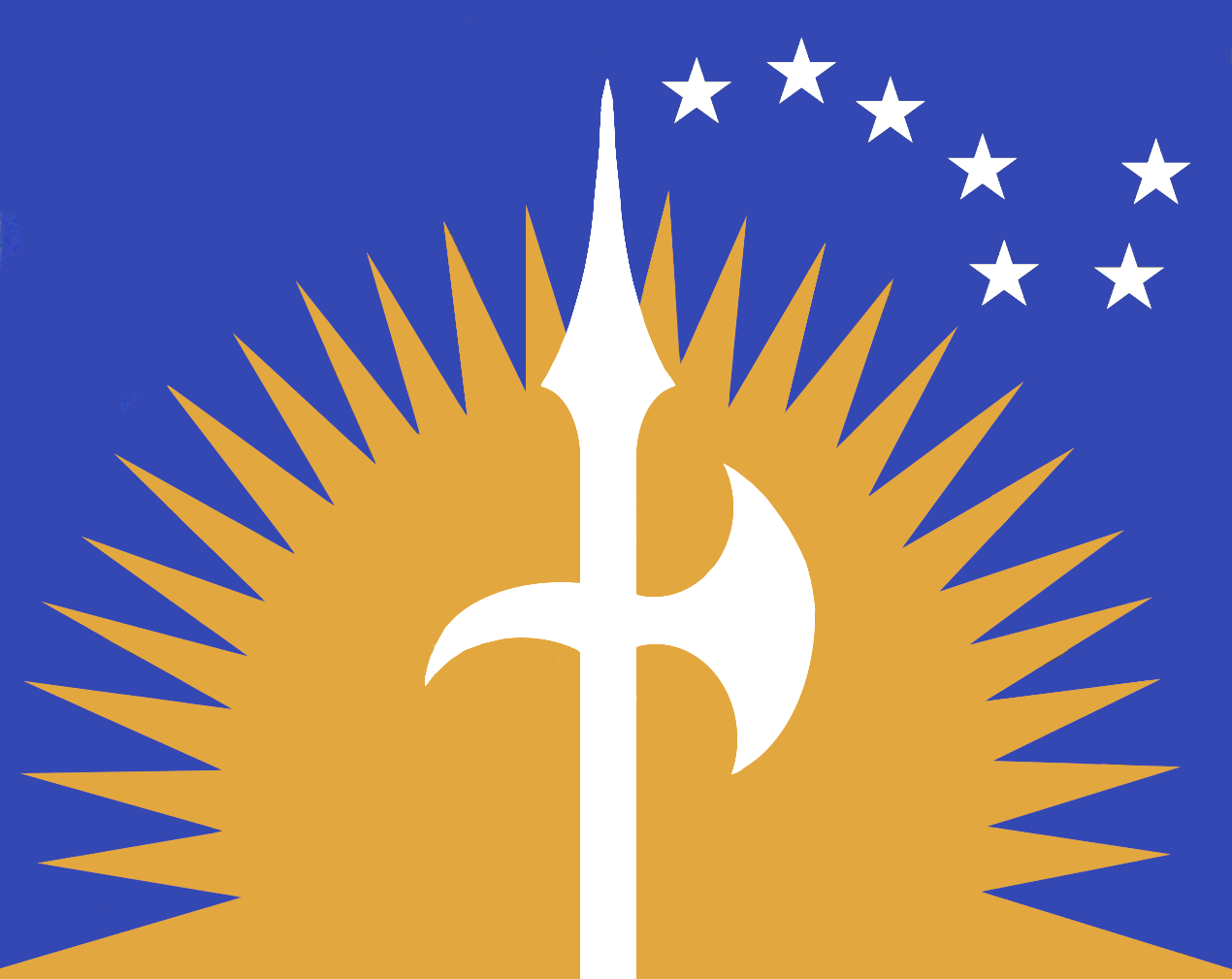
A version of the sunburst flag which incorporates the Starry Plough flag as well as a pike, associated with the United Irishmen. The flag may have been used by the 26th Battalion of the National Army.

A modern variation of the sunburst flag

The sunburst flag (Irish: An Gal Gréine) is an Irish flag associated with early Irish nationalism, Irish culture and language groups, and more recently, youth wings of Irish republican groups such as Na Fianna Éireann. The flag is first thought to have been used in 1858 by the Irish Republican Brotherhood. The sunburst flag is still used today, by both republican groups, and various Irish language and Gaelic revival organisations most notably Conradh na Gaeilge.

== History and origins of the flag ==
The sunburst flag's design is inspired by the Fianna of Irish mythology. Described as brave warriors who performed a large number of impressive feats, the Fianna referred to themselves as either Gal Gréine or Scal Ghréine, which both mean sunburst. The earliest confirmed use of the sunburst flag is found in the 18th century as the guidon of the County Sligo Light Horse. The motto was as Post nubila Phoebus ("After the clouds Sun") symbolising a new day.

The sunburst flag, and the symbol of the sunburst itself came into more common use by Irish nationalists during the 19th century. In 1858, the Irish Republican Brotherhood adopted the flag as their symbol. During the American Civil War, the sunburst motif was incorporated by several Irish regiments in their standards. In 1893 the Irish-language group called Conradh na Gaeilge established themselves, using the flag as the group's symbol in reference to the Fianna.

During January of 1861 a group of French Zouaves were visiting Cork and they were given a banner by the local Nationalists. On the banner was a representation of the sunburst flag between the Stars and Stripes and French tricolor.

== Modern Usage ==
Flag of the Communist Party of Ireland

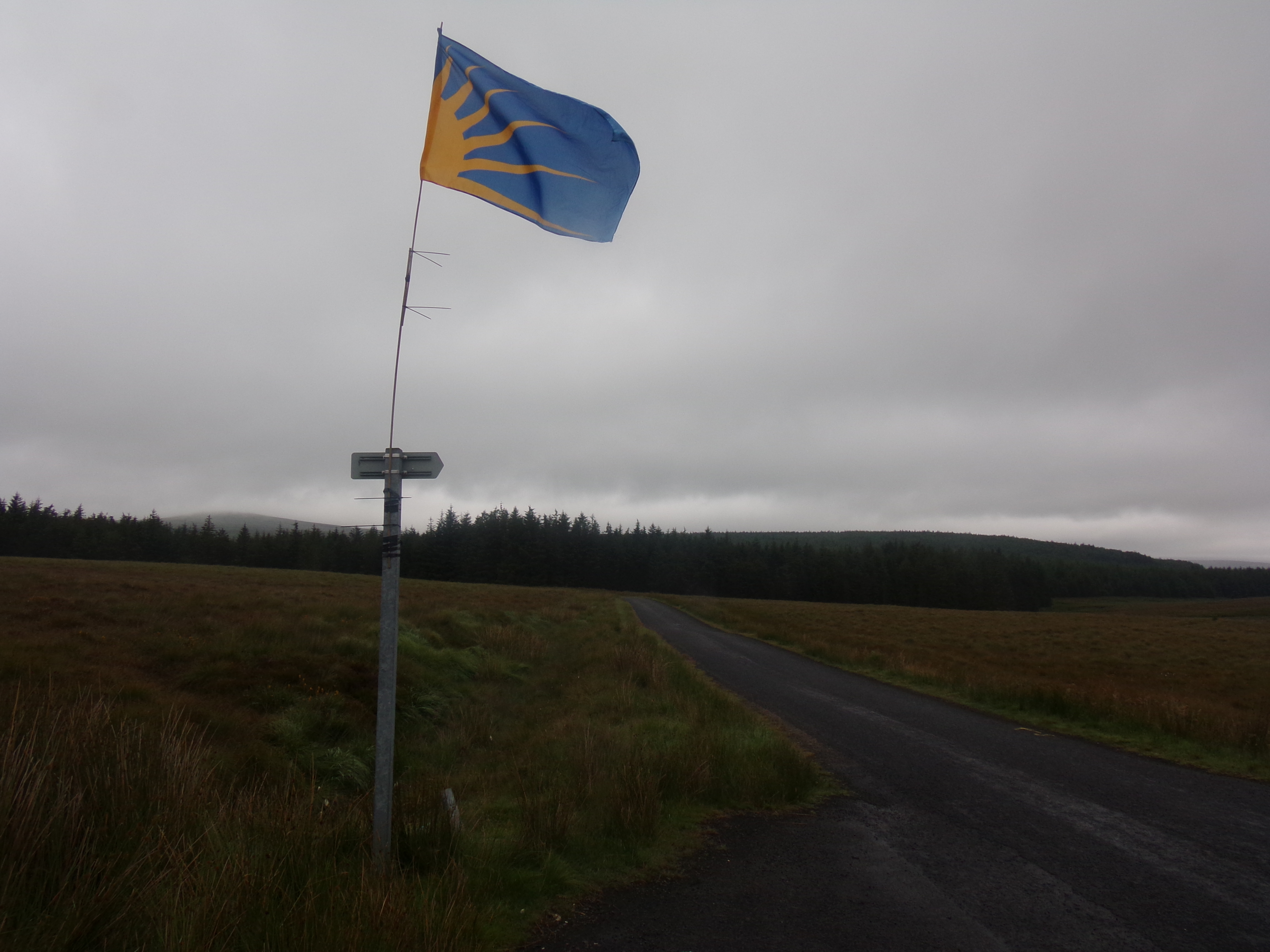
Modern republican sunburst variant flying at Old Cushendun Road in county Antrim, Northern Ireland.

Since the 1970's, the Communist Party of Ireland have incorporated the sunburst design into their flags on a field of Gules as recently as the 2014 local elections where they stood two candidates, both of which lost.

Several dissident republican groups and the Republican Network for Unity have also incorporated the design since the early 2000's, including Saoradh a decade later. In northern counties, such as Antrim, variants can be found flying on rural county roads and private residencies. These flags are often flown by dissident republicans but usage is not necessarily exclusive to them. In the United States, for example, some fraternal organizations like the Ancient Order of Hibernians still incorporates the sunburst design into their badges, emblems, and occasional flags. There also exists, in New York, an Irish-American micronation and or organization that also uses a variant of the sunburst design locally.

Variants not affiliated with the dissident republicans, such as the Irish Military College, typically use variants of the banner closer to the early 20th century Fenian orders, where the half-sun and its expanding rays are centered on the lower edge of the flag, the sunbeams alternating between short and longer ones. By contrast, most dissident republican flag variants, after 1990, tend to place a quarter-sun in the lower left field of the flag with rays emanating outwards into the top right field in either straight, wavy, or alternating between both. Additionally, after 1970, both official and unofficial sunbursts have changed from the traditional gold-yellow to orange reflecting the final block of the Tricolour.

== See also ==
- Nebra sky disk
- Rising Sun (badge), a badge of the Australian army
- Rising Sun Flag, a Japanese flag
- Starry Plough (flag)
