= Óglaigh na hÉireann (Real IRA splinter group) =

2009–2018 Irish republican paramilitary group

- Leader: Seamus McGrane
- Dates active: 2009–present
- Active regions: Northern Ireland (mainly); Republic of Ireland
- Ideology: Irish republicanism
- Size: 50 members (2010)
- Wars: the Dissident Irish republican campaign

Óglaigh na hÉireann (pronounced [ˈoːɡl̪ˠiː n̪ˠə ˈheːɾʲən̪ˠ]; ONH) is a small dissident Irish republican paramilitary group that took part in the dissident Irish republican campaign. The organisation started carrying out attacks around 2009 having been formed after a split, led by Seamus McGrane, within the Real IRA.

In December 2010, the group's strength was estimated to be about 50 members and it was recruiting and training in Northern Ireland and the Republic of Ireland. The group has carried out high-profile attacks on the Police Service of Northern Ireland (PSNI) and the British Army in Northern Ireland. The organisation seems to be mainly based in the Belfast area, and there are also elements within the Derry, Strabane and south Armagh / north Louth areas. However, with the growth of the larger Real IRA after it merged with other dissident groups in July 2012 to form the New IRA, the organisation's activity has steadily declined. Splits and an intelligence campaign waged against it by the PSNI and MI5 have caused the organisation to lose many members, according to media reports. The organisation is said to be aligned with the Republican Network for Unity, a republican socialist group, although RNU has denied this.

The group called a ceasefire in January 2018, announcing they were suspending all operations against the British state. However, a group of members formed the new group Irish Republican Movement and threatened to continue the fight against British forces. The ONH itself has continued to target former members and drug dealers.

== Name ==
Óglaigh na hÉireann is an Irish language idiom for "soldiers of Ireland", "warriors of Ireland", "Irish Volunteers", or "volunteers of Ireland". It is referred to as ONH for short by many, including the Independent Monitoring Commission.

== Origins ==
The organisation came into existence after a split among the leadership of the Real IRA. These tensions were evident as far back as late 2003, when Real IRA members in Portlaoise Prison called on the leadership to stand down and call off its campaign. A dispute started as a result, with most Real IRA prisoners at the time siding with the older leadership who founded the organisation. The organization was formed in 2009, with the split led by Seamus McGrane.

== Weaponry ==
It is not well known what weaponry Óglaigh na hÉireann had access to. Most of its attacks used improvised explosive devices rather than more conventional military weapons. These include coffee jar bombs, car bombs, pipe bombs, improvised mortar, under car booby traps and other booby traps. These are weapons that have been used in attacks they have claimed. In August 2013 the group was blamed for planting a Katyusha-style rocket in undergrowth next to a field near Cullyhanna in South Armagh. The weapon was to be triggered using a mobile phone.

Other attacks Óglaigh na hÉireann has carried out have used conventional weapons such as grenades, assault rifles and pistols. In 2010 a man on a bicycle threw a "Russian type" hand grenade at PSNI officers attending a call to a betting shop. The officers were injured and the grenade caused slight damage to a kerb. In 2022 during an Easter parade a 3D printed FGC-9 was spotted.

== Campaign ==
In November 2010 an ONH leader stated that "The Provisional IRA took approximately 15 years to wind down. There is no ready-made IRA pack that can be assembled in a short period of time. An [Óglaigh na hÉireann] capable of having a sustained campaign will take time to develop."

=== 2009 ===
- 1 September: Óglaigh na hÉireann was believed to have been behind the planting of a 600 lb roadside bomb close to the border near Forkill, County Armagh. It was likely meant to blow up a PSNI patrol. However, it was abandoned by those who planted it, and defused by the British Army.
- 16 October: Óglaigh na hÉireann claimed responsibility for detonating a booby-trap bomb under a PSNI officer's car in Kingsdale Park, east Belfast. The bomb exploded as the officer's girlfriend was driving the car alone, and she suffered minor wounds. The bomb was planted under the passenger side.
- 21 November: Óglaigh na hÉireann was blamed for a failed car bomb attack on the Northern Ireland Policing Board headquarters in Belfast. A 400 lb car bomb was driven through a security barrier by two men, who then fled. The bomb partially exploded.

=== 2010 ===
- 8 January: Óglaigh na hÉireann claimed responsibility for an under-car booby-trap bomb attack on a PSNI officer in Randalstown, County Antrim. The bomb exploded shortly after the officer left his home. He was badly hurt in the attack and had to have one of his legs amputated.
- 12 April: Óglaigh na hÉireann was blamed for a car bomb attack on Palace Barracks in Holywood, County Down. The British Army base houses MI5's Northern Ireland headquarters. A taxi driver had been forced to drive the 120 lb bomb to the base. He abandoned the car shortly before midnight, prompting the PSNI to clear the area. The bomb exploded twenty minutes later, lightly wounding an elderly man. This attack was initially blamed on the Real IRA.
- 6 May: Óglaigh na hÉireann's Derry Brigade claimed responsibility for disrupting an election count (for the 2010 Westminster election) at Templemore Sports Complex in Derry. The group had hidden a hoax device in the building before the count began. As the count was underway, Óglaigh na hÉireann members forced a taxi driver to drive a pipe bomb to the building. A warning was issued, and the building was evacuated shortly before midnight. The British Army carried out a controlled explosion on the pipe bomb, but the other device was not found for a further four days.
- 12 July: Óglaigh na hÉireann's Derry Brigade claimed responsibility for a gun attack on a burning PSNI vehicle during a riot. Five shots were fired at the vehicle after it had been hit with petrol bombs in the Bogside area of Derry after several hours of rioting as a result of The Twelfth parades.
- 3 August: Óglaigh na hÉireann's Derry Brigade claimed responsibility for detonating a 200 lb car bomb outside the Strand Road PSNI station in Derry. Like the attack on 12 April, a taxi driver was forced to drive the bomb in his taxi to the station. The bomb exploded at 03:20, 22 minutes earlier than the warning had said. There were no casualties but several businesses were badly damaged from the blast. The attack was condemned by many politicians. Philip O'Donnell was subsequently sentenced to 13 years with half of it to be served in prison.
- 21 September: Óglaigh na hÉireann's Derry Brigade claimed responsibility for a gun attack in Derry. The group said that its members had gone to a house to order the occupant to leave the country. When the gunmen found he was not at home, they fired shots through the windows of his car.
- 5 November: Óglaigh na hÉireann's Belfast Brigade claimed responsibility for a grenade attack on three PSNI officers in Belfast. The officers were investigating a robbery on Shaws Road when a man on a bike threw the grenade. All three were injured and one suffered severe arm wounds.
- 15 November: In a punishment shooting, a sex offender was shot five times in the abdomen, groin and leg areas.

=== 2011 ===
- 7 February: Óglaigh na hÉireann claimed responsibility for an arson attack on a taxi depot on Oldpark Road, Belfast. It claimed that the owners were using the depot as a cover for drug dealing.
- 27 March: Óglaigh na hÉireann claimed responsibility for planting a car bomb in Derry. The 110 pounds (50 kg) bomb was left in a car-park on Bishop Street, beside the court-house. The group issued a telephoned warning and the bomb was made safe by the security forces.
- 28 March: Óglaigh na hÉireann claimed responsibility for throwing a "coffee-jar bomb" at the PSNI on Grosvenor Road, Belfast. The device deflected into waste ground. The group then issued a telephoned warning and it was made safe by the security forces.

=== 2012 ===
- 5 January: Óglaigh na hÉireann claimed responsibility for planting a booby-trap bomb in a soldier's car at Blackdam Court, Belfast. It said that the device was hidden under the driver's seat and was connected to the seat buckle. However, the device was spotted and later made safe by the security forces.
- 28 April: Óglaigh na hÉireann were blamed for planting a bomb underneath a car in a loyalist area of Belfast. The PSNI said the car had belonged to an officer but had recently changed hands.
- 4 June: A volley of more than a dozen shots was fired from an automatic rifle at the funeral of republican Brian Mac Fadden in the Bogside, Derry.
- 6 June: Óglaigh na hÉireann claimed responsibility for a grenade attack on a PSNI vehicle at Whin Park, Belfast. A number of vehicles were damaged but nobody was injured.
- 11 June: Óglaigh na hÉireann claimed responsibility for a grenade attack on the PSNI at Barnfield Road, Dunmurry. Local residents reported hearing a loud bang in the area and the police issued an appeal for information. Nobody was injured.
- 13 July: A gunman opened fire on the PSNI during a riot in the Ardoyne area of North Belfast. The attack was captured on video. Óglaigh na hÉireann claimed responsibility.
- 27 July: Óglaigh na hÉireann claimed responsibility for attacking a PSNI vehicle on Glen Road, Belfast. A single shot was fired at the vehicle and the group claimed it had fired a horizontal mortar, triggered by a mobile phone. However, the PSNI denied that a mortar had been fired.
- 25 October: A pipe bomb was thrown at PSNI officers responding to a call in Poleglass, west Belfast. However, it failed to detonate. Óglaigh na hÉireann was blamed.
- 30 December: Óglaigh na hÉireann was believed to be behind an attempted car bombing in east Belfast. A PSNI officer was preparing to go out for lunch with his family when he checked under his car and discovered the device. The discovery prompted a security alert and the area was cordoned off for a number of hours.

=== 2013 ===
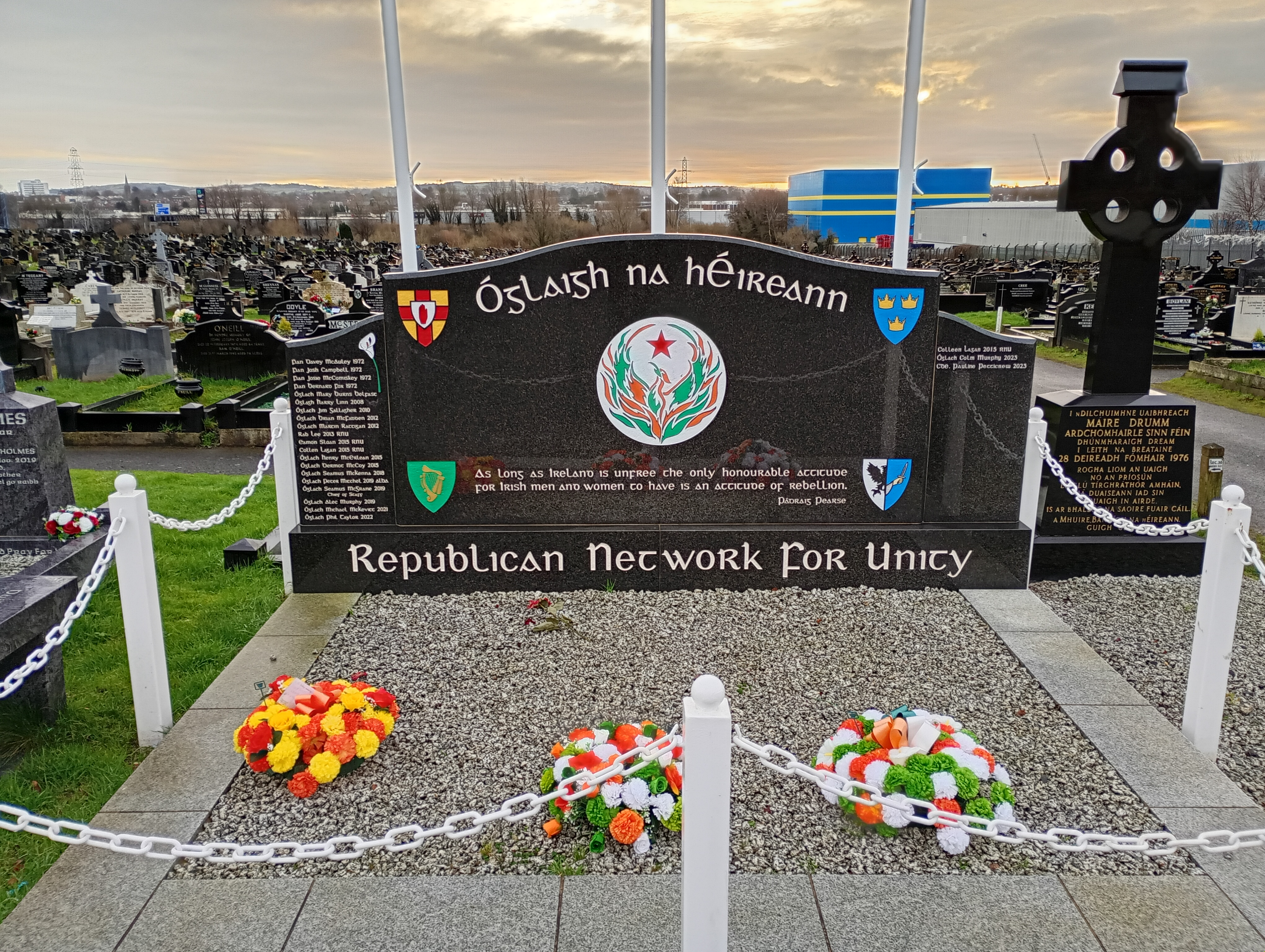
Óglaigh na hÉireann and Republican Network for Unity memorial in Milltown Cemetery, Belfast

- 29 January: Óglaigh na hÉireann issued a bomb warning to a North Belfast community centre, forcing it to be evacuated. A pipe bomb was found in the building's back yard and taken away by the British Army.
- 30 January: Óglaigh na hÉireann was believed to be behind a failed pipe bomb attack on a PSNI car in the Oldpark area of north Belfast. A number of homes were evaluated in the security alert that followed.
- 9 March: A bomb exploded near PSNI officers on the Duncrue towpath in north Belfast. There were no injuries. Óglaigh na hÉireann claimed responsibility.
- 15 March: A mortar attack on a New Barnsley PSNI station in Belfast was foiled after a PSNI officer spotted the launcher. Óglaigh na hÉireann claimed responsibility.
- 23 March: The British Army defused a car bomb abandoned on the Derrylin Road near Enniskillen. Óglaigh na hÉireann said it had planned to detonate it at the Lough Erne Resort—the hotel hosting the 39th G8 summit—but had to abort the attack.
- 1 April: A member of Óglaigh na hÉireann fired a volley of shots into the air at a republican commemoration in Ardoyne, north Belfast.
- 15 May: A Belfast man claimed that Óglaigh na hÉireann had ordered him to smuggle a bomb into Stormont. He believed he was targeted because of his role with a support group, Survivors and Victims of Institutional Abuse, which holds meetings in the building.
- 16 May: Shots were fired and a bomb thrown at PSNI officers as they got out of their vehicle in Foxes Glen, Belfast. The three officers dived for cover and drove away. Police did not return to the scene for a number of hours. Óglaigh na hÉireann claimed responsibility.
- 11 July: Óglaigh na hÉireann was blamed for an attempted bomb attack on PSNI officers in north Belfast. Officers responded to a call that shots had been fired at an abandoned house in Ardoyne. A booby-trap bomb was found behind the front door, having failed to detonate.
- 12 August: Two pipe bombs were thrown at a Woodbourne PSNI station in west Belfast. One exploded, but there were no injuries. Óglaigh na hÉireann was blamed.
- 27 August: There was an attempted mortar attack near Cullyhanna, County Armagh. A bomb warning was sent by telephone to lure the PSNI into the area. The weapon was to be triggered by mobile phone, but the attack was abandoned when the PSNI failed to respond to the telephone call. The device was found in undergrowth two weeks later and made safe.
- 25 November: A car bomb partially exploded on Victoria Street in Belfast, near Victoria Square Shopping Centre and a PSNI station. A man was forced to drive the 132 pounds (60 kg) bomb to the spot and then raised the alarm. There were no injuries and only the car was damaged. It was the first such attack in Belfast city centre for many years. Óglaigh na hÉireann claimed responsibility.
- November: Republican Michael Bellew was beaten with baseball bats and shot in both legs in the kitchen of his Cullyhanna farmhouse. Óglaigh na hÉireann claimed responsibility accusing him of placing "the lives of volunteers at risk of death or capture as well as risking the capture of equipment belonging to the organisation" due to assisting the PSNI.
- 13 December: Óglaigh na hÉireann claimed responsibility for a bomb attack in the Cathedral Quarter, Belfast. A small bomb exploded in a holdall outside St Anne's Square, which houses a number of upmarket restaurants. A telephoned warning had been sent 45 minutes beforehand and there were no injuries.

=== 2014 ===
- 15 October: Patrick Crossan, a criminal who killed a greengrocer in 2007, was abducted at gunpoint from a house by masked men and shot in the leg in the Turf Lodge area of Belfast. His injuries were not life-threatening but his leg was badly injured. ONH claimed he was attempting to "slip unnoticed back into the community".

=== 2015 ===
- 27 February: Óglaigh na hÉireann was blamed for a booby trap bomb attack on Frank McCabe Jr, the son of well known south Armagh Republican Frank McCabe, who was maimed after he removed a poster on a pole near Cullyhanna. The poster was believed to be intended for another well known Republican. Unionist politicians expressed concern about rising tensions within Republicanism in the area.
- 18 October: Paul Philip Crawford was charged with being a member of the organisation. Two other men were arrested; one was released though it is unknown whether the second man was convinced of the charges.
- 13 November: Police received an anonymous telephone call claiming that a bomb had been left near Drumsurm. The bomb had apparently been placed 5 weeks prior.
- 19 November: The group attempted to kill a man in west Belfast. They later issued a statement saying he was "targeted by OnH volunteers using a shotgun due to his links to a notorious criminal gang headed up by a west Belfast family".
- 25 November: ONH left a bomb in a lane way of the Carnanbane Road, Banagher. ONH claimed it was "an attempt to kill British security force members who were parked in the lane at that time."
- 30 November: ONH left a pipe bomb on the doorstep of a house in Ard-Na-Smoll, Dungiven.
- 5 December: ONH left an IED device at the Quarry Steps car park on Spencer road, Derry. They also claimed to have left a bomb in the Derry railway station but none was found. It was believed that the intent was to raise tensions between Republicans and Unionists.

=== 2016 ===
- 6 January: Gardaí announced they had seized weaponry belonging to various dissident republicans including Óglaigh na hÉireann over the last two years.
- 6 January: ONH was responsible for what they called an "explosion" at a house on Farkland Road near Foreglen. They "ignited a gas cylinder by a remotely detonated incendiary". The house was thought to be unoccupied though police had found a stash of drugs there in October 2014.
- 19 January: ONH released a statement, in which they claimed responsibility for a number of bombings.
- June: ONH shot a man in the Ardoyne area.
- 29 July: ONH fired three shots into the air at Park, County Londonderry in a show of strength.
- 16 October: ONH shot a man in the leg six times in a punishment shooting. They also intended to kill another man in north Belfast but he wasn't home at the time. They later issued a warning stating that the man had 24 hours to leave the country or he would "face execution". These activities were condemned by Sinn Féin politician Jennifer McCann.
- December: A 16 year old was shot in both legs by ONH for "anti-social behaviour". His family say he had been threatened by dissident republicans since age 14.

=== 2017 ===
- January: A man and a woman were shot in the leg after they tried to protect their son from ONH members. Their son was a target due to supposed antisocial behaviour. The attack was condemned by MLAs Pat Sheehan and Alex Attwood.
- Mid January: ONH left an explosive device in west Belfast with the intent to kill police officers. The device was defused after it was reported that a strange device had been left in the area.
- 7 February: 3 threats were made to three siblings, a 14-year-old girl, a 16-year-old boy (shot in December 2016, see above) and an 18-year-old boy. They were ordered to leave the country. They left within hours of receiving the threats.
- Late March: ONH bombed a property in Waterside, Derry.
- 10 April: The Derry brigade of ONH issued a threat to a former ONH member. They said if he ignored the warning, he would be executed. ONH claimed he was guilty of financing drug dealing.
- May: ONH announced that over the last few months there has been ongoing "wide ranging discussion about tactics, strategy and the future of the republican struggle" but that "...it certainly doesn't translate to disbandment or disarming – Óglaigh na hÉireann will not contemplate these options"

=== 2018 ===
- 23 January: The leadership of Óglaigh na hÉireann issued a statement declaring that they were suspending all actions against the British state. This was confirmed at a press conference in Belfast called by two prominent trade unionists and Éamon Ó Cuív TD. The ceasefire was welcomed by Sinn Féin leader Gerry Adams and Tánaiste Simon Coveney.
- 12 April: Disgruntled members of Óglaigh na hÉireann formed the Irish Republican Movement and made statements to a local newspaper threatening "Crown Forces".
- 4 December: Óglaigh na hÉireann killed a man in front of a school on the Glen Road in west Belfast, waiting to pick up his 13-year-old son.

=== 2020 ===
- 17 May: Former ONH member Kieran Wylie was shot dead at a home in Lenadoon Avenue, Belfast. Police suspect dissident Republicans were responsible. ONH claimed responsibility at an Easter Rising commemoration ceremony in 2022.

=== 2021 ===
- 2 February: Former ONH member Danny McClean was shot dead in a parked car on Cliftonville Road, Belfast. ONH claimed responsibility at an Easter Rising commemoration ceremony in 2022.

=== 2022 ===
- 17 April: Óglaigh na hÉireann held an Easter Rising parade and commemoration ceremony at Milltown cemetery, Belfast. ONH members showed newly acquired automatic weapons; the first armed display in Milltown cemetery since the Provisional IRA ceasefire in the 1990s. The group claimed responsibility for killing several alleged drug dealers and former ONH members in the preceding years. ONH also threatened to "target" Loyalist leadership figures if the UVF or UDA attacked Republican and Nationalist communities.

=== 2024 ===
- 21 June: Óglaigh na hÉireann released a statement that a leadership takeover has taken place. It is suggested it has been as a result of growing concern on the direction that the organisation was taking.
- 18 September: Potential violence is feared as Óglaigh na hÉireann splits into two factions, each claiming wrongdoings against the other.

=== 2026 ===
- 5 August: Masked members claiming to be members of Óglaigh na hÉireann posed with 3D printed Glock pistols during the week of north Belfast republican Matt McCarthy.

== See also ==
- Timeline of Continuity Irish Republican Army actions
- Timeline of Real Irish Republican Army actions
