= Revolutionary Housing League =

Political organization in Ireland

Revolutionary Housing League Sraith Réabhlóideach Tithíochta
- Abbreviation: RHL
- Founded: June 2022
- Preceded by: Revolutionary Workers Union
- Ideology: Anti-homelessness; Anti-eviction; Revolutionary socialism Irish republicanism
- Political position: Far-left
- Affiliated groups: Anti-Imperialist Action Ireland

The Revolutionary Housing League (RHL) is an Irish socialist republican housing activist group that was founded in 2022 by the Revolutionary Workers Union (RWU). It has carried out direct action by squatting in empty buildings. The group is affiliated with Anti-Imperialist Action Ireland.

== History ==
In May 2022 a group calling themselves the Revolutionary Workers Union (RWU) began squatting in a building on Eden Quay in Dublin and dubbed it "James Connolly House". The building was owned by the Salvation Army and was reportedly being refurbished for use by Ukrainian refugees fleeing the Russian invasion. The Salvation Army said the refurbishment had to be stopped because of the squatters. The RWU claimed there was no evidence that the building was being refurbished before their arrival. The group claimed to refurbish the building themselves, which they said was derelict, and were operating it as a homeless shelter amongst other uses. In late May, the High Court ruled that the squatters must leave and in early June, after the RWU said they would not abide by the order, they were evicted by the Garda Síochána.

Following their expulsion from Eden Quay in June 2022, the Revolutionary Housing League was created as a separate organisation from the Revolutionary Workers Union.

In June 2023, several court hearings were held in relation to a Dublin City property being developed to house the elderly being squatted by the RHL.

In May 2026, the Revolutionary Housing League occupied the long-vacant Ardee House pub in Dublin's Liberties and announced plans to reopen the building as the "Anne Devlin Community Centre". The occupation became public on 25 May after activists invited local residents into the premises and stated that they intended to develop the site into a community space and cafe. The property had been closed since 2010 and has been owned by Black Sheep Investments since 2017. Members of the group said they had cleaned and repaired parts of the building, restored electricity and running water, and received offers of assistance from local tradespeople. The RHL described the action as a response to the lack of community facilities in the Liberties and to the broader condition of working-class areas in Dublin. The occupation prompted a Garda public order response on 25 May after the property owner, whiskey entrepreneur Jack Teeling, became aware of the situation. Gardaí attended the premises during the afternoon, while supporters gathered outside following social media calls for solidarity. The confrontation ended without escalation, and most officers later withdrew. Local residents quoted in coverage of the occupation expressed support for the project, citing concerns about the growth of hotels and student accommodation in the area without corresponding community infrastructure. Before the occupation, Black Sheep Investments had submitted plans to redevelop the site into 14 apartments with a ground-floor community facility, although Dublin City Council had ruled the planning application invalid pending resubmission.

On 27 May 2026, the High Court heard that the RHL remained inside Ardee House despite repeated demands from Black Sheep Investments to vacate the building following their 25 May occupation. The owners argued that the disused pub was structurally unsafe and had been assessed as unsuitable for public use, and said they only became fully aware of the scale of the occupation through media reporting. The court was told the occupants had made internal alterations and were planning a public event involving food and possibly unlicensed alcohol service. Finding sufficient evidence of ongoing trespass and health and safety risk, the judge granted urgent injunctions restraining the occupation and any interference with the property, ordered service of the decision at the premises and via online contact details, and listed the case to return on 3 June 2026. At a High Court hearing on 3 June, RHL members Eoghan Lynch and Seán Doyle formally identified themselves as occupants of Ardee House and indicated that they intended to contest the legal proceedings. Rather than extending the previous blanket trespass injunction, the court adjourned the case for a week to allow them to obtain legal advice and file responding affidavits. However, citing engineering evidence regarding the building's condition, Judge Brian Cregan ordered that no members of the public be admitted to the premises and that no work of any kind be carried out on the building pending further order. The RHL had continued operating activities from Ardee House, including hosting meetings, running a café, and holding a garden party.

== Ideology ==
As part of printed material distributed by RHL during campaigning, the group states that it "opposes the dominance of vulture funds, Airbnbs and multinationals over Irish housing". A Socialist and Irish Republican organisation, RHL has stated that "the housing crisis can not be resolved through the present political system" and has invoked the phrase "all right to public property must be subordinated to the public right and welfare" from the Democratic Programme of the First Dáil in its material.

RHL is heavily affiliated with another Socialist Irish Republican group called Anti-Imperialist Action Ireland.

== See also ==
- Irish National Land League
- Community Action Tenants Union
- Dublin Housing Action Committee
- Derry Housing Action Committee
- Landless People's Movement
- Squatting in Ireland
- Tenants union
