= Irish Republican Voice =

- Formation: Summer 2013
- Dissolved: February 2014
- Type: Left-wing group
- Location: Ireland
- Leader: James McDonagh

Irish Republican Voice was a political group founded by dissident republicans. The group was believed to be the political wing of the group Saoirse na hEireann (itself an RIRA splinter group). The IRV denied this though they said they recognise it as the only legitimate army. Members included prominent dissident republicans such as Paul Stewart and James McDonagh.

== History ==
The group was formed in the summer of 2013 by ex-associates of murdered RIRA leader Alan Ryan.

In September 2013 they were involved in anti-austerity protests outside the Dáil. They were also involved in a sit-down protest on O’Connell Bridge which stopped traffic for up to three hours. They later threatened to engage in similar protests in 2014.

In December 2013, the group held a fundraiser at the Barn House Pub in Dolphin's Barn, Dublin.

On 5 February 2014, midnight the IRV ceased operations and disbanded. Sources say the group was forced to disband by other republicans but leader James McDonagh denied this saying they stood down “for Irish republican unity”.

== See also ==
- Saoradh
- Republican Sinn Féin
- 32 County Sovereignty Movement
