= Eilis O'Hanlon =

Northern Irish writer

Éilis O'Hanlon (born 1965) is an Irish novelist and journalist. She writes for the Sunday Independent. She co-authored, with her husband Ian McConnel, four novels under the pen name Ingrid Black. Her book, The Dead, published in 2003, was honoured with the Shamus Award for Best First PI Novel. O'Hanlon's work appears in The Field Day Anthology of Irish Women's Writing.

== Views ==
O'Hanlon is a longstanding opponent of Irish Republican views; In 2004 O'Hanlon was described as one of Sinn Féin's 'sharpest critics' by The Guardian, while in 2021 The Phoenix described O'Hanlon as "long a scourge of republicanism".

O'Hanlon has written of her opposition to emigration from Ireland, frequently arguing that this has damaged and continues to damage the nation.

In 2021 O'Hanlon wrote a series of articles in which she expressed her opposition to new hate crime laws being introduced in Ireland, claiming that "Pushing us to perceive hate where none exists is just toxic".

=== Views on transgender people ===
Since the 2010s, O’Hanlon has frequently written articles critical of transgender people, healthcare, and related topics.

In December 2021 O’Hanlon criticised the Rose of Tralee competition for its inclusivity of women who are transgender.

In March 2022 O'Hanlon criticised the National Women's Council of Ireland for supporting transgender women. In July 2022 O’Hanlon implored readers not to "consent to propaganda disguised as sex education" and to reject "unscientific assertions" that children "can change sex" while in the same month O’Hanlon described people providing access to gender-affirming health care for transgender children as "extremists".

In June 2022 O’Hanlon wrote an article titled "Women must be free to speak without fear of trans backlash", which alleged that transgender activists are using public money to radically reshape society behind the scenes while trying to silence dissent.

In August 2022 O’Hanlon wrote an article titled "The future will condemn us for pandering to the trans agenda" which criticised Irish politicians and media figures for not condemning the NHS Gender Identity Development Service in the United Kingdom where many Irish children were sent, and compared it to incidents of child abuse by the Catholic Church in Ireland.

Several publications and organisations in Ireland have criticised O'Hanlon's views on transgender people, including Hot Press, Gay Community News and Transgender Equality Network of Ireland. An article by Hot Press accused O'Hanlon of sharing "false information in an effort to spread fear and target hate towards the trans community" while The Transgender Equality Network of Ireland accused O'Hanlon of transphobia in an official statement.

In October 2023, O'Hanlon published a commentary in the Irish Independent praising the stance of religious academic Colette Colfer who publicly refused to follow her employer's policy on gender identity. O'Hanlon contrasted Colfer's approach to that of fellow activist Enoch Burke.

== Personal life ==
O'Hanlon is the daughter of Sam and Tess (née Cahill) O'Hanlon, and her uncle was the late Joe Cahill, a senior figure in the Irish Republican Army from the 1940s onwards. Her elder sister was the late Provisional Irish Republican Army member and Sinn Féin politician, Siobhán O'Hanlon and she is a cousin of the Labour party senator Máiriá Cahill. The two sisters remained estranged at the time of Siobhán's death from breast cancer, due to Eilis's criticism of Sinn Féin.

== Published works ==
- The Dead, Minotaur Books, 2004; ISBN 978-0-312-32632-6
- The Dark Eye, Headline Paperbacks, 2004; ISBN 978-0-7553-0704-3
- The Judas Heart, Penguin Books, 2007; ISBN 978-0-14-102530-8
- Circle Of The Dead, Penguin Books, 2008; ISBN 978-0-14-102531-5
