= Anti-Imperialist Action Ireland =

Anti-Imperialist Action Ireland Gníomh Frith-Impiriúlach na hÉireann
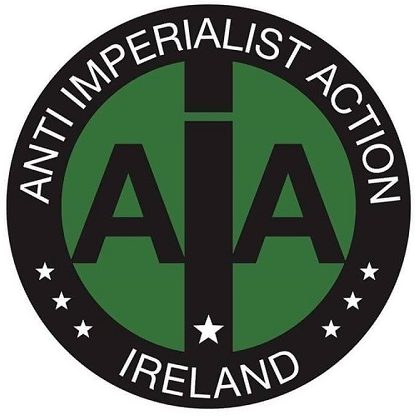
- Abbreviation: AIA
- Founded: 2017
- Youth wing: Óige Réabhlóideach/Anti-Imperialist Youth
- Ideology: Anti-imperialism; Hard Euroscepticism; Irish republicanism; Marxism-Leninism; Maoism; Revolutionary socialism
- Political position: Far-left
- Colours: Black; Green; White

Website
- https://anti-imperialist-action-ireland.com/

Anti-Imperialist Action Ireland or AIA Ireland is an Irish socialist republican organisation active since 2017. Ideologically, it has been described as combining "socialist republicanism and militant antifascism with broader revolutionary anti-imperialism directed against British, EU, and US influence". It has been reported in connection with protest actions in Ireland, including anti-monarchy demonstrations, commemorative marches, and actions against symbols associated with Britain.

== Ideology ==
AIA describes itself as a socialist-republican organisation that campaigns against what it calls "British, EU and US imperialism" in Ireland. AIA says it aims "to finish the work" of historical Irish socialists such as James Connolly, and Seamus Costello, founder of the Irish Republican Socialist Party (IRSP) and the Irish National Liberation Army (INLA). It opposes the Good Friday Agreement and "reformism"; not participating in elections and opposing a border poll as it believes this is a pacification strategy. One observer described that its educational canon is "heavily rooted in revolutionary socialist, Marxist-Leninist and Maoist traditions".

== Activities ==
In 2018, AIA painted over street signs on Victoria Road in Killiney, Dublin, saying that the road was named after Queen Victoria and calling for similar actions against street names associated with British rule.

In 2018, Israeli minister Gilad Erdan asked the Irish government to prevent Palestinian activist Leila Khaled from addressing an AIA and Lasair Dhearg event in Dublin by video link.

In August 2020, Traditional Unionist Voice leader Jim Allister condemned a video from a group calling itself AIA that showed republicans burning the Union flag, a poppy wreath, and British Army flags in Northern Ireland.

In September 2022, AIA took part in an anti-monarchy protest in Dublin during which a coffin marked "RIP British Empire" was thrown into the River Liffey.

In November 2022, AIA claimed responsibility for a paint attack on the headquarters of the Royal British Legion in Dublin.

In October 2023, AIA members marched to Glasnevin Cemetery in Dublin to mark a hunger strike commemoration.

== See also ==
- Irish Republican Socialist Party
- Lasair Dhearg
- Revolutionary Housing League
- Saoradh
