= Siobhán O'Hanlon =

Irish activist and IRA volunteer (1963–2006)

- Born: 1963; Belfast, Northern Ireland
- Died: 11 April 2006 (aged 45)
- Political party: Sinn Féin
- Spouse: Pat Sheehan
- Relatives: Eilis O'Hanlon (sister)
- Military career
- Paramilitary: Provisional IRA
- Rank: Volunteer
- Unit: Belfast Brigade
- Conflicts: The Troubles

Siobhán O'Hanlon (1963 – 11 April 2006) was a Provisional IRA volunteer and Sinn Féin activist.

== Family ==
O'Hanlon was born in North Belfast in 1963, one of six children of a republican family. Her father, Sam, had been interned, and her maternal uncle was IRA Army Council member Joe Cahill, who died in July 2004. O'Hanlon married Pat Sheehan with whom she had a son, Cormac. One of her sisters, Eilis, is a newspaper columnist critical of physical force Irish republicanism; the two apparently remained estranged at the time of Siobhán's death.

== IRA activity ==
In 1983 O'Hanlon was jailed after being found in a bomb-making factory. She served four years of a seven-year sentence for explosives offences. She was again arrested in Los Angeles County in 1989, briefly jailed then deported after admitting she concealed her conviction on US immigration forms.

Some British newspapers claim she was involved in an attempted Provisional Irish Republican Army bombing in Gibraltar, prevented by the Special Air Service (SAS) in Operation Flavius. In 2009 Professor Christopher Andrew was given access to MI5's records, to prepare a book for the centenary of the organisation. The book contains a surveillance photo of O'Hanlon taken in Gibraltar in 1988, prior to the shootings of three other IRA members by the SAS. It contains a map of her movements. The files indicate that she noticed she was under surveillance in Spain and returned to Ireland.

== Sinn Féin activity ==
O'Hanlon was a member of the first Sinn Féin delegation to meet the British Prime Minister Tony Blair in Downing Street in December 1997. She was heavily involved in Sinn Féin's negotiating team at Stormont in the run up to the Good Friday Agreement. In October 2001, she arranged and accompanied Adams on a visit to South Africa where they met Nelson Mandela and unveiled a memorial (to ten republican hunger strikers who died in the 1981 Irish hunger strike) at Robben Island Prison where the former African National Congress leader had been jailed. She was a member of Sinn Féin's Belfast Executive and participated in the Northern Ireland peace process negotiations in Stormont.

== Activism ==
O'Hanlon died from breast cancer at age 45, having been diagnosed three and a half years earlier in October 2002. In that time she became a breast cancer activist who organised a conference as a way of bringing activists together to talk about breast cancer, raise awareness and draw attention to the mobile breast cancer screening units.

O'Hanlon also co-founded the West Belfast Festival called Feile an Phobail and devoted many years to its success, and she performed voluntary work for adults with Down's syndrome.

== Tributes ==
Sinn Féin President Gerry Adams was a pallbearer at O'Hanlon's funeral, which was attended by more than 1,000 mourners.

He eulogised:

"She headed up our office here in West Belfast. When we think back to that time it was a very dangerous and difficult ... Comrades and friends were killed or wounded. And every day we picked ourselves up and worked on."

Adams dedicated his commemoration of the 90th anniversary of the 1916 Easter Rising to O'Hanlon. Danny Morrison for the Daily Ireland wrote:

"We shall benefit from the work Siobhán did in her life – in the freedom struggle, in the peace process, in the bridges she built, the international fraternities she established and maintained, for the goodwill she engendered towards republicanism – and for the huge political enterprises to which she contributed."

== See also ==
- History of Northern Ireland
- Northern Ireland peace process
