= 32 County Sovereignty Movement =

Irish political pressure group

- Chairperson: Francis Mackey
- Founder: Bernadette Sands McKevitt
- Founded: 1997
- Split from: Sinn Féin
- Ideology: Irish republicanism Socialism; Anti-imperialism

Website
- 32csm.org

The 32 County Sovereignty Movement, often abbreviated to 32CSM or 32csm, is an Irish republican group that was founded by Bernadette Sands McKevitt. It does not contest elections but acts as a pressure group, with branches or cumainn organised throughout the traditional counties of Ireland.

The 32CSM had been described as the "political wing" of the now defunct Real IRA, but this was denied by both organisations. The group originated in a split from Sinn Féin over the Mitchell Principles. The group was designated by the United States as a Foreign Terrorist Organization.

== Objectives ==
- "The restoration of Irish national sovereignty".
- "To seek to achieve unity among the Irish people on the issue of restoring national sovereignty and to promote the revolutionary ideals of republicanism and to this end involve itself in resisting all forms of colonialism and imperialism."
- "To seek the immediate and unconditional release of all Irish republican prisoners throughout the world."

== History ==
The organisation was founded as the 32 County Sovereignty Committee on 7 December 1997 at a meeting of like-minded Irish republicans in Finglas in Dublin. Those present were opposed to the direction taken by Sinn Féin and other mainstream republican groups in the Northern Ireland peace process, which would lead to the Belfast Agreement (also known as the Good Friday Agreement) the following year. The same division in the republican movement led to the paramilitary group now known as the Real IRA breaking away from the Provisional Irish Republican Army at around the same time.

Most of its founders had been members of Sinn Féin; some had been expelled from the party for challenging the leadership's direction, while others felt they had not been properly able to air their concerns within Sinn Féin at the direction its leadership had taken. Bernadette Sands McKevitt, wife of Michael McKevitt and a sister of hunger striker Bobby Sands, was a prominent member of the group until a split in the organisation.

The name refers to the 32 counties of Ireland which were created during the Lordship and Kingdom of Ireland. With the partition of Ireland in 1920–1922; 26 of these counties formed the Irish Free State which was abolished in 1937 and is now known as Ireland since 1949; the remaining six counties of Northern Ireland remain part of the United Kingdom. Founder Bernadette Sands McKevitt said in a 1998 interview with the Irish Mirror that people did not fight for "peace" – "they fought for independence" – and that the organisation reaffirms to the republican position in the 1919 Irish Declaration of Independence.

Before the referendums on the 1998 Good Friday Agreement, the 32CSM lodged a legal submission with the United Nations challenging British sovereignty in Ireland. The referendums were opposed by the 32CSM, but were supported by 71% of voters in Northern Ireland and by 94% in the Republic of Ireland. It was reported in February 2000 that the group established a "branch" in Kilburn, London.

In November 2005 the 32CSM launched a political initiative titled Irish Democracy, A Framework For Unity.

On 24 May 2014, Gary Donnelly, a member of the 32 County Sovereignty Movement, was elected to the Derry and Strabane super council. In July 2014, a delegation from the 32 County Sovereignty Movement travelled to Canada, to take part in a six-day speaking tour. On arrival the delegation was detained and refused entry into Canada.

== Protests ==
32CSM march to commemorate the Easter Rising, Dublin, April 2010

The 32CSM has protested against what it calls "internment by remand" in both jurisdictions in Ireland.

Other protests include ones against former Democratic Unionist Party (DUP) leader Ian Paisley in Cobh, County Cork, against former British Prime Minister John Major being given the Keys to Cork city, against a visit to the Republic of Ireland by Police Service of Northern Ireland head Sir Hugh Orde, and against the Israeli occupation of Palestine and Anglo-American occupation of Iraq.

In 2015, the 32CSM organised a demonstration in Dundee, Scotland, in solidarity with the men convicted of shooting Constable Stephen Carroll, the first police officer to be killed in Northern Ireland since the formation of the PSNI. The organisation says the "Craigavon Two" are innocent and have been victims of a miscarriage of justice.

== Legality ==
The group is currently considered a foreign terrorist organization (FTO) in the United States, because the group is considered to be inseparable from the Real IRA, which is designated as an FTO. At a briefing in 2001, a spokesman for the US Department of State stated that "evidence provided by both the British and Irish governments and open source materials demonstrate clearly that the individuals who created the Real IRA also established these two entities to serve as the public face of the Real IRA. These alias organizations engage in propaganda and fundraising on behalf of and in collaboration with the Real IRA." The US Department of State's designation made it illegal for Americans to provide material support to the Real IRA, requires US financial institutions to block the group's assets and denies alleged RIRA members visas into the US.

== Outside Ireland ==
The 32CSM also operates outside of the island of Ireland to some extent. The James Larkin Republican Flute Band, founded in 1996 in Liverpool, and the West of Scotland Band Alliance, founded in 1979—the largest section of which is the Glasgow-based Parkhead Republican Flute Band— are supporters of the 32CSM. The larger flute band communities in these areas tend to be aligned to Sinn Féin. As of 2014, the 32CSM's alleged paramilitary wing, the Real IRA, was reported to still be involved in bombing attempts on British soil, as part of the dissident Irish republican campaign ongoing since 1998.

== See also ==
- Saoradh
- Irish Republican Voice
- Republican Sinn Féin
- Republican Network for Unity
- Fianna Éireann
