= Republican Network for Unity =

Irish republican political party in Northern Ireland

Republican Network for Unity Poblachtáigh do Aontiú
- Abbreviation: RNU
- Founded: 2007; 19 years ago
- Paramilitary wing: Óglaigh na hÉireann (Alleged, former)
- Ideology: Irish republicanism Dissident republicanism Socialism
- Political position: Left-wing

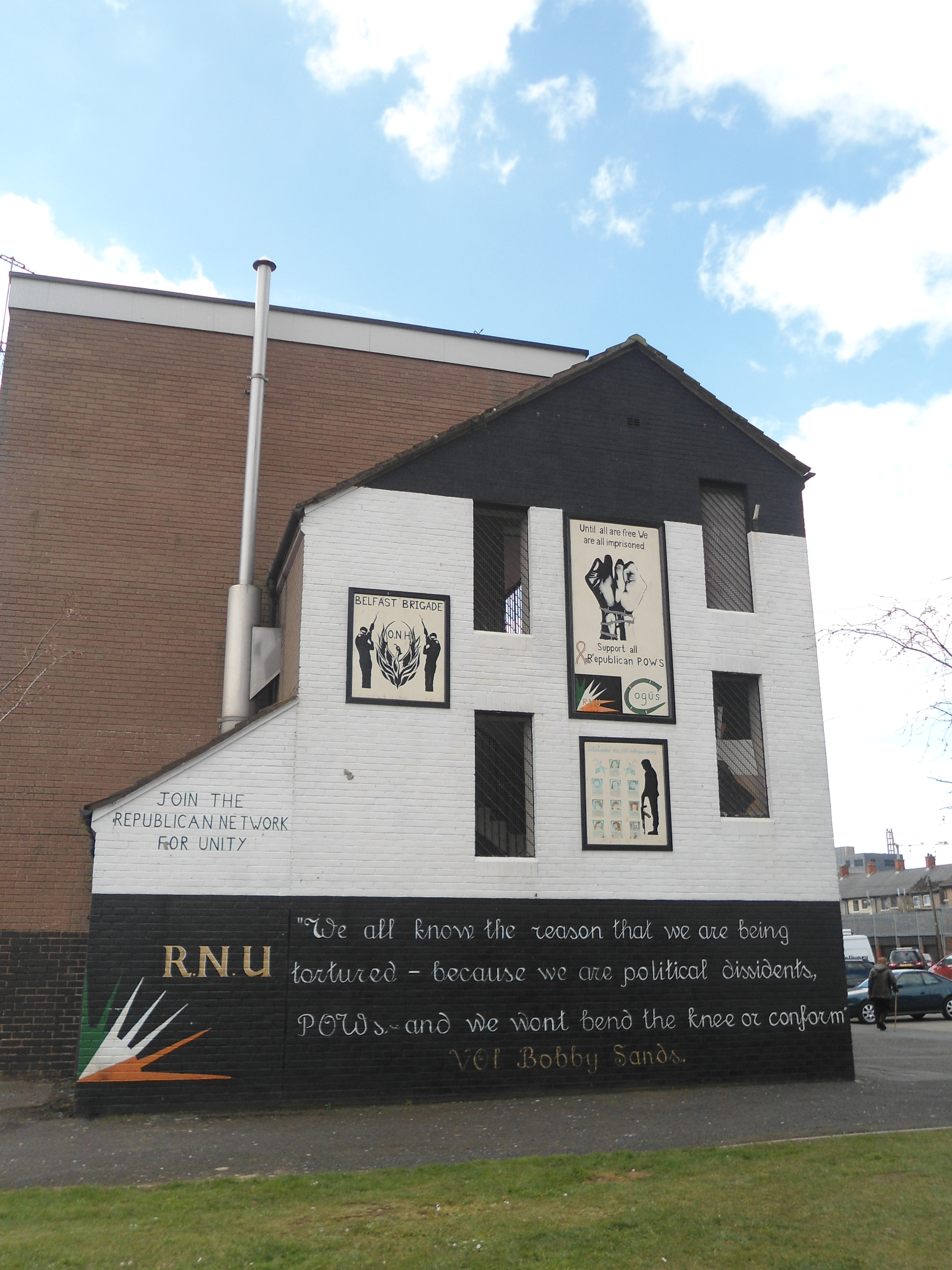
RNU mural in Belfast, 2013

The Republican Network for Unity (Irish: Poblachtaigh d'Aontú, literally "Republicans for Unity") is a small Irish republican political party. It was formed in 2007 in opposition to the Sinn Féin special Ard Fheis's vote of support for the Police Service of Northern Ireland. A number of commentators view RNU as the political wing of Óglaigh na hÉireann (ONH), a militant dissident republican paramilitary group. That group committed to a ceasefire in 2017, which RNU supported. In 2024 ONH severed ties to the party.

== History ==
The organisation was originally known as the "Ex-POWs and Concerned Republicans against RUC/PSNI & MI5". This group was formed by ex-republican prisoners and combatants who opposed the decision by Sinn Féin to support policing structures in Northern Ireland such as the PSNI. The group re-organized in 2008, changing its name to "Republican Network for Unity". It held its first Ard Fheis in Derry City that year and elected local republican Danny McBrearty as its first national chairman, along with Tony "TC" Catney as a national organiser and Carl Reilly as "6 county co-ordinator". The party was subsequently involved in campaigns including opposition to plans to introduce water meters and anti-political policing and support for republican prisoners and their families.

By late 2011 the group moved into more community-based politics and believed that electoral politics should be explored. After a motion put forward by the then leadership, RNU agreed to reconstitute as a political party and in October 2013, it registered as a political party with the electoral commission NI and moved from being a pressure group. This coincided with the release of their documents "standing outside the peace process" and "revolutionary Republicanism". RNU is opposed to the Good Friday Agreement because it believes that it usurps Irish sovereignty and entrenches Irish partition. RNU opposes the PSNI, which it sees as a continuation of the disbanded Royal Ulster Constabulary and the first stage of protection of an illegal state.

In 2015 a number of senior members of RNU were arrested by the PSNI, including then RNU Chairman Carl Reilly who was accused of being the Belfast commander of ONH. Reilly was charged with directing terrorism and being a member of a proscribed organisation.

In 2017 ONH committed to a ceasefire and the RNU supported it, declaring that it was time for Irish republicanism to adapt to the politics of the 21st century and not be ideologically bound to 20th-century thinking.

In 2018 the Times reported that a charity in Northern Ireland named "Conflict Resolution Services Ireland", which claimed to offer mediation services for people threatened by ONH punishment attacks, had been infiltrated by the RNU and used to siphon money. Several members of the staff of CRSI were in fact members of RNU, including Carl Reilly. The charity had received £100,000s in charitable donations through the state over the course of four years; however, by 2018 its offices had been raided three times in two years by counterterrorism units, and the charity itself was under investigation by regulators.

In 2022 it was reported that in November 2020 RNU, alongside other Dissident republican parties such as Saoradh and the Irish Republican Socialist Party, had been approached by the national chairman of Sinn Féin, Declan Kearney, about creating a united republican campaign for a Border Poll in Northern Ireland. RNU refused to publicly state if they had been willing to work on the campaign with Sinn Féin or not.

In June 2024, following a takeover of Óglaigh na hÉireann by a hardliner faction, the new leadership severed all ties to the party citing dissatisfaction with its acceptance of peace process funding. As of December 2024, a dwindling rival faction of the former leadership remains.
