= Saoradh =

Irish political party

- Chairperson: Stephen Murney
- Vice-chairperson: Brian McKenna
- National Secretary: Sean Hanna
- Founded: September 2016; 10 years ago
- Headquarters: Derry, Northern Ireland
- Paramilitary wing: New IRA (alleged)
- Youth wing: Éistigí ("Listen")
- Membership (2022): roughly 60 to 100 activists
- Ideology: Irish republicanism Dissident republicanism Revolutionary socialism Hard Euroscepticism; Anti-imperialism
- Political position: Far-left
- Slogan: Unfinished Revolution

Website
- saoradh.irish

Saoradh (Irish: [ˈsˠiːɾˠə], "Liberation") is a far-left political party and pressure group formed by dissident Irish republicans in 2016. It is active in both the Republic of Ireland and Northern Ireland. The Police Service of Northern Ireland and independent commentators describe the party as being close with the New IRA, although Saoradh themselves deny this.

Traditional variation of the sunburst flag, upon which the Saoradh logo is based

== History ==
=== Foundation ===
The party was founded in 2016 by former members of the 32 County Sovereignty Movement, Republican Sinn Féin, the Irish Republican Socialist Party and others.

The 12 person national executive of the party sat at the top table under a banner of the signatories of the 1916 Proclamation, which was composed of republican activists, including:

- Nuala Perry (vice-chairperson and former Provisional IRA prisoner)
- Kevin Murphy (a former Real IRA prisoner)
- Risteard Ó Murchú, (a former republican prisoner)
- Sharon Rafferty
- Dee Fennell
- David Jordan
- Mandy Duffy, a sister-in-law of Colin Duffy.

A third of the executive was female, while out of all 150 in attendance, men outnumbered women 10 to 1.

A message of support from veteran republican leader Billy McKee was read out and a statement from New IRA prisoners expressing their support for the party was read out by Thomas Ashe Mellon.

David Jordan said being elected chairman of the party was "humbling, daunting, intimidating yet empowering". Chair of the Association of Palestinian Communities in Scotland (APCS), Issam Hijjawi, also spoke.

On the same day Saoradh issued the following press release:

Today, Saturday the 24th of September 2016, we a significant collective of Irish Republican activists, who for a number of years have acted autonomously, have after a number of years of debate, consultation and organisation today in Ard Fheis organised, constituted and launched a Revolutionary Irish Republican Party, the Party's name is Saoradh.

Saoradh believes that Ireland should be governed by the Irish People with the wealth and wealth-producing mechanisms in the ownership of the Irish People. This can not happen while British imperialism undemocratically retains control of Irish destinies and partitions our nation, this cannot happen while a neo-colonial elite in a subservient supposed indigenous administration sells the nation’s labour and natural resources to international capital.

Saoradh does not believe that British imperialism or capitalist exploitation can be confronted in the structures they have created to consolidate their undemocratic control of the Irish nation. As such we believe any assembly claiming to speak for the Irish People without being elected by the united people of the Irish nation to be illegal. Saoradh will seek to organise and work with the Irish People rather than be consumed and usurped by the structures of Ireland’s enemies,

Standing on a long and proud revolutionary Irish Republican history of resistance, inspired by the actions and words of Tone, of Connolly, of Mellows, of Costello and of Sands, upholding the founding documents of our forefathers – the 1916 proclamation, the declaration of independence and the democratic programme of the first Dáil, Saoradh hereby declares its commitment to the unfinished revolution, the liberation of Ireland and the social emancipation of the Irish People.

Saoradh's emblem combines the sunburst flag with the socialist red star, a pike which references the 1798 United Irishmen Rebellion, and the three national colours of Ireland: green, white and orange.

=== Reaction to its formation ===
SDLP MLA Nichola Mallon said it was "the first step in a journey that every militant group in the history of the Irish republican tradition has ever taken" and that "they should now take steps two, three and four to avoid unnecessary and unwanted violence that the people of Ireland have rejected at every opportunity". Democratic Unionist Party MLA Lord Maurice Morrow said that the action showed that dissidents "realise they are failing to gain support in their campaign and have moved into the political sphere". He added that it "will be very interesting to see what, if any, support this new political party will have". Ulster Unionist Party declared that it welcomed anyone engaging in the political process but that Saoradh have adopted "a tired and outdated abstentionist programme that has failed in the past and will fail again". Traditional Unionist Voice leader Jim Allister said that former IRA members have for years been "lauded as statesmen and elevated to the highest offices in the land after gaining their status off the back of the Provisional IRA terror campaign". He asked, "Will Saoradh follow the trajectory of Sinn Féin and gain politically from violence?" Sinn Féin said that its vision and analysis have won the support of half a million voters and that they "encourage genuine political debate within republicanism".

In November 2016, the wife of IRA volunteer James "Junior" McDaid (shot dead by the 25th Light Regiment Royal Artillery in 1972) criticised Saoradh after they named their Derry offices on Chamberlain Street "Junior McDaid House" after her husband. She said nobody had invited her or told her the branch would be named after him and added that she didn't know if he would have approved of it.

=== Since 2019 ===
In April 2019, it was announced that the headquarters, Junior McDaid House, was closed as they had been given notice to quit by their landlord, Tracey Murray.

In August 2019, Saoradh chairman Brian Kenna announced that a continuation of dissident republican violence is "inevitable". That same month, the group held demonstrations in Glasgow.

In November 2020 the leadership of Saoradh was contacted by the national chairman of Sinn Féin, Declan Kearney, who sought to include Saoradh alongside other Republican groups in a united campaign for a Border Poll in Northern Ireland. Saoradh did not respond to the request and later stated they would not support any border poll or referendum on Irish unification unless that poll's electorate was the entirety of Ireland, not two separate referendums in the jurisdictions of the Republic of Ireland and Northern Ireland. Sinn Féin was criticised by political parties in Northern Ireland for trying to include Saoradh as Saoradh is still believed to be engaged with the New IRA. Sinn Féin defended the action saying the inclusion of groups such as Saoradh would bring those groups into the democratic process.

== Shooting of Lyra McKee ==
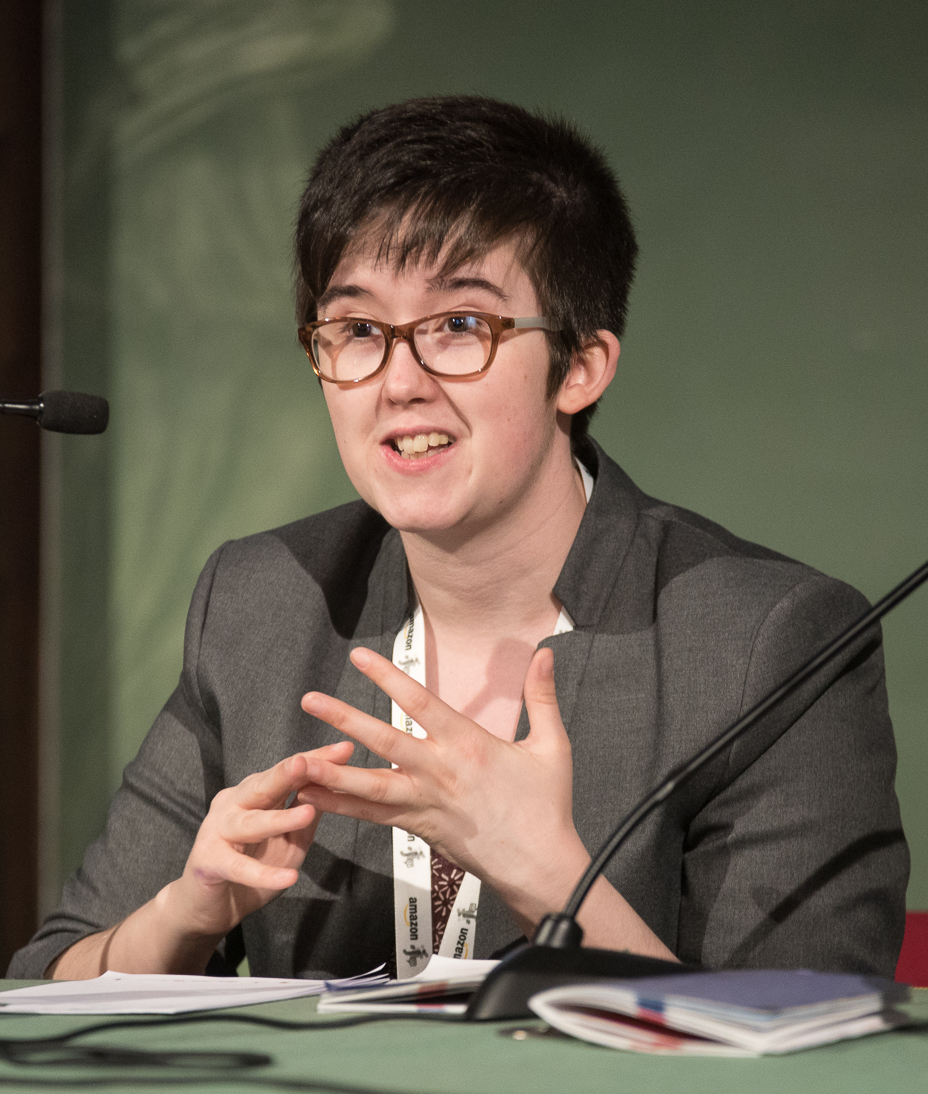
Lyra McKee was killed by a bullet fired by a member of the New IRA during a riot in the Creggan district of Derry.

On 18 April 2019, investigative journalist Lyra McKee was murdered while observing rioting in the Creggan district of Derry. Mobile phone footage was released showing a masked gunman, a member of the New IRA, opening fire with a handgun. Saoradh subsequently released a statement that "a republican volunteer attempted to defend people from the PSNI/RUC", after an "incursion" by "heavily armed crown forces", and that McKee was "killed accidentally". This was interpreted by TheJournal.ie as the group "defend[ing] the actions of those responsible".

Saoradh held an Easter Rising commemoration parade in front of the General Post Office, the main site of the Rising in 1916, in Dublin on Easter Saturday, 21 April, less than three days after the death of McKee. The parade featured members dressed in paramilitary-style clothing. It was condemned by Ministers in the current Dáil Éireann government with Minister for Justice Charlie Flanagan labelling it as "disturbing".

Four days after the shooting, friends of McKee gathered in protest at Saoradh's headquarters, Junior McDaid House, and used red paint to place handprints on the walls of the building to "show that the blood is on their hands".

By 9 October 2021 a dozen people associated with Saoradh had been charged in connection with McKee's shooting and New IRA-related terror offences.

== Clashes with the authorities ==
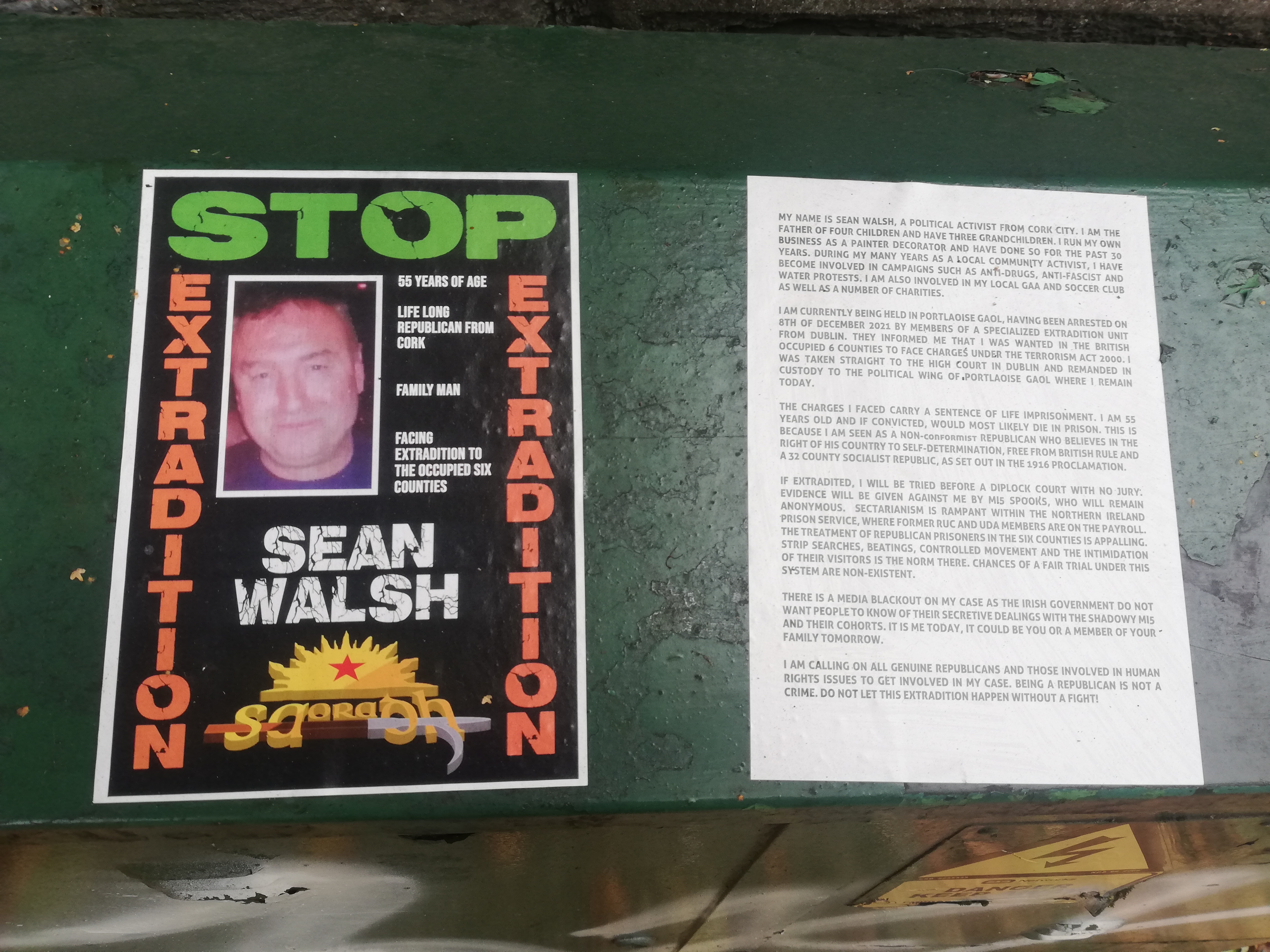
Saoradh propaganda poster opposing the extradition of Sean Walsh (New IRA)

=== Interaction with police ===
In April 2019, Saoradh's national chairman Brian Kenna was subject to a stop and search by six armed police in Dungiven whilst returning to Dublin following a party meeting in Derry. The party released a statement stating it will "stand firm in [its] opposition to the current harassment, intimidation and political repression" of its members, and that the authorities are "fearful of our growth and realise that our political narrative is being accepted by the community."

In November 2019, five properties associated with Saoradh including the party's headquarters, were raided by anti-terror police allegedly on the basis that an illegal lottery was being run. Saoradh called the raid an attempt to "thwart community activism and the support network for current Republican Prisoners and their dependents" and claimed that since its inception in 2016, harassment of Irish republicans by security forces had been "stepped up". In the raid a sum of money and lottery paraphernalia was seized, and a 31-year-old man was arrested and later released on bail.

=== Interaction with British intelligence ===
In May 2019, Kevin Collins, a former member of Saoradh, claimed he was approached by two men while on holiday in Tenerife who Collins alleged were MI5 agents. Collins claimed that the two men were following him while he went on various holidays over the past 12 months, purportedly attempting to recruit him as an informant. In an interview with The Irish News, Collins stated that the Spanish police detained him at gunpoint in June 2018, when he travelled to the Palma de Mallorca Airport, and brought him to a room where he alleged that the two men asked him to infiltrate dissident republican groups in Northern Ireland.

In February 2020, while travelling through Bristol Airport, Saoradh member Paddy Gallagher was allegedly subjected to an MI5 recruitment effort. A statement published by Saoradh stated that Gallagher was led to a small room in the airport where two individuals, whom they alleged represented themselves as members of the Intelligence Corps, informed him that he could "help them out with information about Derry" and attempted to recruit him as an informant. In the statement, Saoradh also claimed that Gallagher was held by the Avon and Somerset Police under the terms of the Terrorism Act 2000 and questioned over his recent visit to Bristol. A Home Office spokesperson responded to Saoradh's allegations regarding Gallagher by stating that "We do not routinely comment on individual cases. The Government’s priority is the safety and security of the UK, and the use of Schedule 7 powers is a vital tool for the police".

In February 2021, Saoradh claimed via social media that a covert listening device disguised as a rock was discovered by its members in Creggan, Derry. Saoradh stated that the alleged device had been placed there by a "male figure, in dark clothing" following "widespread covert activity by British military intelligence". Derry City and Strabane District Council councillor Gary Donnelly stated in response to the allegations that the purported device "was obviously there to gather audio information to spy on the community. There has been a lot of overt and covert activity in the area over the last couple of weeks. It’s my belief that this device was being used for the same purposes."

== Ideology and policies ==
Saoradh seeks to establish a 32-county socialist republic across the island of Ireland, regarding Northern Ireland's status in the UK as an "illegal occupation". It is opposed to the current power-sharing government in Northern Ireland and is highly critical of Sinn Féin, whom the party's former chairman David Jordan describes as "false prophets who have been defeated and consumed by the very system they claim to oppose". The party also views the government of the Republic of Ireland as illegitimate as it is not elected by the people of the whole island. As part of this, Saoradh supports the release of all republican prisoners. It is thus abstentionist. It may contest future elections, but candidates elected to Dáil Éireann or the Northern Ireland Assembly will not take their seats.

The party opposes the European Union and in 2019 the party reaffirmed its support for Brexit, with Chairperson Brian McKenna stating “Saoradh supports an exit from the super-imperialist EU, this has been a long-standing revolutionary position. We see Brexit as a defeat for the business and political elite of Britain, Ireland and Europe.”

== Alleged links to militant republicanism ==
Various media sources claim that the party is linked to militant republicanism, with the BBC describing them as the "most public face" of its remnants in the province. The Unionist Belfast Telegraph refers to Saoradh as the "political wing" of the New IRA, a group formed in 2012 by the merger of the Real Irish Republican Army with several other paramilitary groups. The Police Service of Northern Ireland describe the party as the "political voice" of the New IRA and indicate that there is much membership overlap between the two groups.

According to Vice UK, Saoradh "vehemently" denies involvement with any paramilitaries and takes issue with the term "dissident Republican". Shortly after the killing of journalist Lyra McKee, Saoradh released a statement that it was not linked to the New IRA nor any other organisation. Saoradh has the support of New IRA members in prison.

In August 2020, nine senior members of Saoradh were charged with terrorism offences, following an MI5 and PSNI operation in which a meeting of the leadership of the New IRA was secretly recorded. The accused were allegedly recorded discussing plans for bomb attacks and kidnappings. Those charged included founding members of the national executive Mandy Duffy and David Jordan.

In 2021 Saoradh members Peter Gearoid Cavanagh and Jordan Devine were charged with Lyra McKee's murder, as well as robbery, possession of a firearm and ammunition, rioting, possessing and throwing petrol bombs and arson. After being charged, Cavanagh was promoted to become National Secretary of Saoradh.

In July 2026, a member of Saoradh, Isabella Perrie Sullivan was charged with possession of explosives at Trim District Court in relation to the interception of a suspected New IRA bomb transport across the border.

== See also ==
- 32 County Sovereignty Movement
- Irish Republican Voice
- Fianna Éireann
- Republican Network for Unity
- Republican Sinn Féin
