= History of the Ministry of Defence Police =

The Ministry of Defence Police (MDP) in the United Kingdom can trace its origins back to 1686, and has gone through a number of evolutions over the centuries to achieve its present-day form. Until late 1965, the Royal Navy, British Army and Royal Air Force were controlled by separate departments: the Board of Admiralty, the Army Board and the Air Ministry respectively, each had its own Cabinet Minister. In that year it was decided that the three services should be placed under the control of one Minister of State for Defence, and the present Ministry of Defence was formed.

The oldest centrally controlled military force in Britain is the Royal Navy; it was in 1686 that Samuel Pepys instigated a force of civilians to protect the Royal Naval dockyards. Although it wasn't until the early 19th century that Great Britain had an organised civilian police force, in 1834 the Royal Navy Dockyards were given their own uniformed police service. As Britain's armed forces became more centrally organised in the late 19th century, other service establishments were allocated a police presence. The First World War brought about the formation of separated Army and Naval civilian police forces, to be joined in the 1940s by the Air Force Constabulary during the Second World War.

== Army precursors ==
As far as is known, the Army used serving soldiers to guard their establishments in the early days and as (unlike naval dockyards) the employment of civilians by the Army was minimal, there was little call for a civilian police force, except for places such as the Royal Arsenal at Woolwich. Consequently, the first records of police on Army Department sites appear circa 1860 when a division of the Metropolitan Police was created to police the Royal Arsenal. This was a straightforward arrangement as Woolwich is in London.

== Naval precursors ==
=== 1686: Porters, rounders, warders and watchmen ===
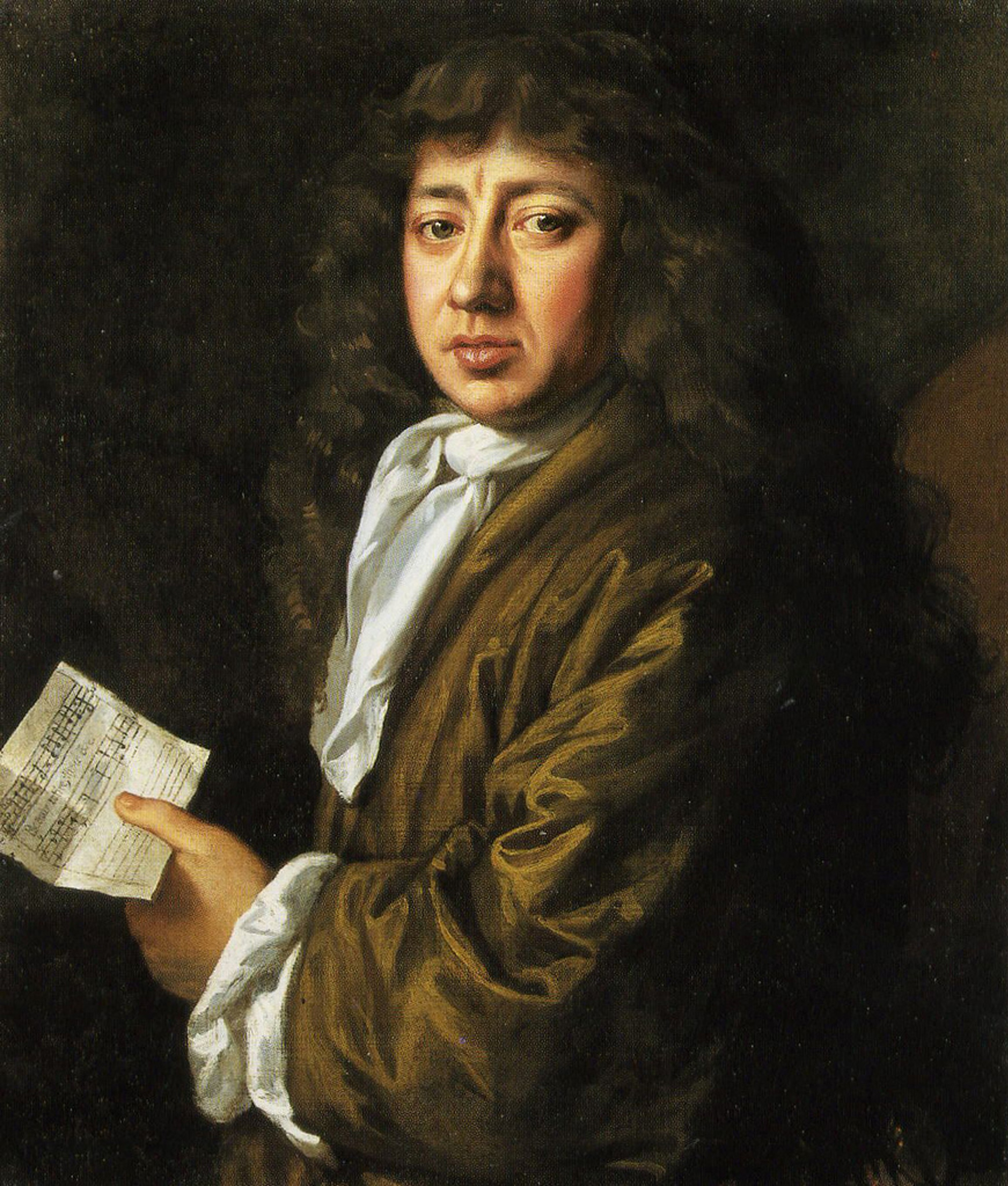
Samuel Pepys ordered the formation of a force of civilian warders to protect Naval dockyards in 1686

Since medieval times there has always been an Army, until comparatively recent times, it consisted of separate bodies raised on a territorial basis; the formation of the Royal Air Force occurred only in the 20th century, after the development of manned human flight.

The Royal Navy, as a department of central government, has existed since 1600 and as early as 1686 records show that the Admiralty was aware of the need for an organisation to prevent crime within its dockyards. At that time, the Secretary for the Affairs of the Admiralty of England (Samuel Pepys), delivered to the special commissioners of the Navy an instruction which included the following:

To enquire after and make use of all means for preventing the embezzlement of any of our Stores, and to that end... to be frequent in visiting the Workmen at their departure out of our said Yards, keeping a Strict and Severe Eye upon the respective Porters of the same, and to the attendance given at the Gates... and lastly to be as frequent as he may, and the distance of Places will admit, in his nightly rounds in and about each of our said Yards, for discovering any unfaithfulness or neglect that may be found in the Watch, charged with the safety of our Stores during that Season.

As a result of Pepys' instructions a force of "Porters, Rounders, Warders and Watchmen" was formed to guard the Naval yards.

The roles performed by the first force of "Porters, Rounders, Warders and Watchmen" were as follows: Porters were responsible for identifying visitors and escorting them to the appropriate heads of departments; Rounders patrolled the Yard or, as their name implies, "did the rounds"; Warders were responsible for the keys and backed up the Porters at the gates; Watchmen, who were employed at night only, guarded or watched important buildings or areas. The latter were part-timers, being dockyard employees who remained in the Yard, on a roster basis—every fourth night after carrying out their normal work and received an extra shilling for the duty. The Rounders appear to have been the senior branch of the force as they kept an eye on the other three bodies and frequently reported their misdemeanours to the Commissioner in charge of the Dockyard.

Apart from this civilian forces, there existed also a military force of Marines, comprising one subaltern, a number of non-commissioned officers (NCOs) and 36 privates. Both the civil and military guards were closely linked and an indication of the economy practised in those days exists, in the form of the Daily Orders Book. The front cover of this book indicated that by reading it in a straightforward manner one would find the order applicable to the Military Guard, but by turning the book upside down and starting at the back the orders for the Civil Guard could be found. Both sets of orders were illuminating and often give examples of professional jealousy. The order book was in great demand by the commissioners during the period of the Napoleonic Wars, a typical order being that issued on 27 January 1793 which read:

A constant look out is to be kept at the gates to prevent admission of two strangers and if the discovery be made of two strangers about 6 feet high, one having a large purple scar upon the right side of his face, both of them speaking English, and appearing to be Englishmen—if within the Gates they are to be stopped and if without some trusty person sent to watch them, and in either case the Commissioner is to be immediately informed thereof.

In 1834 this force was disbanded and the first formal Dockyard Police was formed.

There were constant changes in the organisation during the 18th century, caused mainly by the requirement for the Marine Guard to serve overseas but in 1861 this guard was finally abolished... "except at Chatham, Portsmouth and such places as convicts were employed".

By comparison with the police arrangements then existing throughout the country, the dockyard system was well organised but its fatal weakness was that the Watchmen and Rounders were still being selected from dockyard workers who performed these tasks in addition to their normal duties and in 1822 the commissioner at Portsmouth reported that:

the night Rounders are men of the very best character selected from the Shipwrights of the Yard" and that "the Warders now at the Yard Gates are the best we have ever had, and by their strict attention to this part of their duty have become very obnoxious to the people in general.

=== 1834: The Dockyard Police ===
While the above events were taking place in the dockyards, Sir Robert Peel's recommendations culminated in the creation of the Metropolitan Police (the Peelers) in 1829, and although there was no hint of the Admiralty looking upon this method of protection with any favour, on 20 May 1834 they disbanded the Porters, Rounders, Warders and Watchmen and introduced police forces; consisting of Special Constables for the dockyards and a smaller number of other establishments.

In forming these police forces they had the benefit of the advice of a superintendent of the newly formed Metropolitan Police whose greatest service was that he ensured they were formed in accordance with "the new and advanced theories and ideals of police functions and duties which had been conceived and formulated by the Two Commissioners of the Metropolitan Police" and which "were quickly copied throughout the entire area of the Country and of the Empire". Members of the new Dockyard Police forces were sworn in under a form of oath. This gave them full police powers within the limits of the dockyards; at a later stage, powers were given to operate under certain specific circumstances as policemen, in connection with offences committed by employees and naval personnel, within a radius of five miles outside the dockyard.

The conditions of employment in the new Dockyard Police forces were very good when compared with those of the majority of people during the 19th century. They received good wages, had the incentive of rewards, and could even take their families on overseas service (although "family" only included one child). Constables were paid 19 shillings per week for a seven-day week and were allowed half pay—up to a maximum of 28 days—when on sick leave. This latter condition was one which did not apply to most employees in the country even one hundred years later. On the 28th day they were required to be fit for duty or, if unfit, were dismissed; if after dismissal they fully regained their health they were given preference for re-entry over all other applicants for employment with the force.

Reference to salaries paid to higher ranks is not made in the Dockyard Police Regulation Book but old dockyard standing orders show that in 1845 the Lieutenant Director was in receipt of £250 per annum plus fringe benefits—in the form of 15 pence per night subsistence allowance paid for duties which kept him out of the yard all night—together with expenses incurred in boat or carriage hire. A similar order, dated 6 December 1858 gives details of a pay rise for Serjeants who received £1.4s.6d. for a seven-day week. No mention is made of Inspectors.

As has already been stated, in addition to normal pay, certain rewards were payable and one such incentive was promulgated in 1859, being a payment of £2.10s.0d to policemen who detected persons embezzling government stores after such persons had been found guilty in a summary court; similar payments were made of up to £10, in cases where offenders were convicted on indictment. No doubt there were cases where unscrupulous policemen made false accusations for financial gain, and this incentive has long since disappeared. Despite the relatively good conditions of service things did not appear to have been going at all well with the Dockyard Police forces, and eventually the Admiralty asked for an independent review of their efficiency. This task was allotted to Superintendent Mallelieu of the Metropolitan Police. He set about this in a thorough manner and his final report made it quite clear that, in general, the Dockyard Police forces were ill-trained and, in some instances, not devoting all their energy towards police duties.

As a consequence of this report, and despite such recommendations as training the forces along the Metropolitan Police's lines, increasing pay, and introducing a system whereby men frequently transferred from one establishment to another to avoid undue familiarity with employees—many of whom were related to policemen of local origin. It was finally decided that the best answer was to disband the dockyard forces and introduce the Metropolitan Police into the Dockyards. So, after only 26 years, the dockyard police forces ceased to exist and the Admiralty establishments were, for the next 75 years, policed by the Metropolitan force. In fact, the Metropolitan Police already had experience of Dockyard work, having taken over the responsibility for the two yards at Deptford and Woolwich—which were both already within the metropolitan district in 1841 but until 1858 they had been reluctant to accept any commitment outside the Metropolitan Police district.

On this occasion, however, the Metropolitan Commissioner, Sir Richard Mayne (KCB), raised no objection, merely stating that the proposals could be carried out "by an adequate addition to his Force and such alteration to the Law as found necessary". This latter comment was necessary so that authority might be given for the Metropolitan Police to operate outside both their own metropolitan district and the naval establishments for which they were responsible.

One of Superintendent Mallelieu's major recommendations was that the various establishments should "be grouped together for police purposes". Much later the Admiralty Constabulary (1943) was so organised, as was the present day MoD Police during the 1970s, and therefore a direct link existed between Supt Mallelieu, Sir Richard Mayne, the Metropolitan Police and the MoD Police.

=== 1860: The Metropolitan Police ===
Dockyard Police Division 1904

Following the necessary Act of Parliament in 1860 – the Metropolitan Police Act 1860 – the Metropolitan Police took over policing of Portsmouth and Devonport Dockyards. The smaller establishments in the same vicinities and the remaining naval establishments were quickly taken over, creating five devoted divisions (identified by numbers rather than by letters as were assigned to normal territorial Metropolitan Police divisions):

1. Woolwich Arsenal
2. Portsmouth
3. Devonport
4. Chatham
5. Pembroke

A sixth, for Rosyth Dockyard, was added on 1 January 1916.

There were 128 members of the Metropolitan Police employed at Deptford and Woolwich; and approximately 400 in the other Admiralty establishments. Superintendent Mallelieu was placed in overall charge with a rank "Immediately below that of the Assistant Commissioners". The Act of Parliament increased the geographical area of their powers to a radius of fifteen miles outside the establishment for which they were responsible, with the proviso that these powers were only to be exercised in respect of property of the Crown or persons subject to naval or military discipline. It was also authorised for the first time, their policing of certain army establishments. Another Act of Parliament – the Admiralty Powers, &c. Act 1865 – followed in 1865, which gave considerable assistance to the police in that it made the admiral-superintendent of each yard a magistrate – thus giving him the authority to hear cases brought before him by the Metropolitan Police.

Cells were built adjacent to the main police offices and offenders were kept in them overnight after being charged and brought before the Admiral the next day. The admiral-superintendent could, if he found them guilty, impose a fine or term of imprisonment.

As magistrates, the various admirals-superintendent were also able to issue search warrants which, again, made life much easier for the police. Many of the traditions of the dockyard police and watchmen before them, were carried on by the Metropolitan Police. They continued to serve in the dual role of policemen and firemen; they carried deputations from HM Customs and Excise to assist in the prevention of smuggling, and in the early days they were still responsible for seeing that convicts employed in the yard did not loiter or evade work. The Metropolitan Police also formed a Water Police Branch. At Devonport Dockyard the whole of that branch lived on an old hulk which had at one time been commissioned as the fifth-rate warship HMS Leda. There was an inspector in charge who was allocated what had been the captain's quarters and the remainder of the men lived in the rest of the ship's accommodation. If they were married their families also lived in this accommodation with them. The main difficulty appeared to be that of cooking facilities, as there was only one galley, which had to be allocated in strict rotation.

Originally the men were required to row one complete patrol of the harbour during each shift, but as time went on they managed to obtain the use of steam pinnaces or large coal-burning vessels the size of tugs. Their duties must have been arduous as their powers covered the whole of the waters, which comprised the Port of Plymouth and extended as far as the tidal waters flowed. Is some cases the tide flows upriver for twenty miles, so in the days when they used boats propelled by oars an emergency call to distant parts would have fully tested the endurance of all concerned. During the First World War detachments from the dockyard divisions also policed Royal Navy Cordite Factory, Holton Heath, in Dorset and the Royal Naval Armaments Depot at Priddy's Hard, Gosport.

=== 1922: The Royal Marine Police ===
After the First World War there was a general call for economy throughout the country which was in a state of economic depression and furthermore the Metropolitan Force were under very great pressure in the London area from the effects of the 1926 United Kingdom general strike. In June 1922, the Geddes Committee on National Expenditure recommended the withdrawal from the dockyards of the Metropolitan Police and the Admiralty at that time decided to institute a force to be known as the Royal Marine Police to replace the Metropolitan Force.

The Royal Marine Police was created by an Order in Council and came into being on 13 October 1922. It was administered by the Adjutant General Royal Marines and attached for records, pay, clothing and discipline to the three Royal Marine Divisions at Chatham, Portsmouth and Plymouth (Devonport).

All the members were sworn in as special constables under the Special Constables Act 1923 but were, as the name implies, originally serving and retired members of the Corps of Royal Marines and they were all subject to military law under the provisions of the Army Act. Pensioners from the Royal Navy were subsequently and reluctantly accepted. A chief constable was appointed in 1932 but the replacement of the Metropolitan Police was not completed until 1934 due in part to the Admiralty's desire to proceed cautiously. Initially, members of this new Force were recruited according to their previous ranks in the Armed Forces, ex-NCO's being recruited as Constables in the main and ex-Officers as Chief Inspector and above. This method created a semi-military force as the lower ranks still served under men who had commanded them in the RM or RN. They were subject to Military Law as has already been stated and furthermore during their first two years service they were required to purchase their discharge if they wished to leave the Force. During the first year's service the discharge fee was £20 and during the second year, £10.

Training in the Royal Marine Police and its associated forces was limited to a 3-week course in one of the main dock yards where a self-taught instructor would endeavour to initiate recruits after reading various Acts of Parliament and books of Law. The force also had little time to establish themselves before the Second World War of 1939 was upon them. The restrictive practice of recruiting only RN and RM pensioners showed its weakness with the drying up of the source of supply, men who expected to retire from the Forces being retained for the duration of the War. To counter this the rules were amended to permit ex-servicemen from any branch of the Armed Forces to enlist in a new section of the force known as the Royal Marine Police Special Reserve. This still failed to achieve its aim and a third force, the Admiralty Civil Police was formed and anyone, regardless of former military service, could join. In fact, many men who did join that Force were allowed to do so as an alternative to joining the Armed Forces.

Consequently, at the end of the War in 1945, the Admiralty found itself with three police forces, each with different conditions of service and discipline, but all under the same Chief Constable. This situation was obviously undesirable and inefficient and in October 1949 the three forces were disbanded and the Admiralty Constabulary was formed.

=== 1949: The Admiralty Constabulary ===
At the time of its formation the Admiralty Constabulary comprised some 3500 men policing some 150 separate Naval establishments throughout Great Britain and Northern Ireland. It recognised the RMP's previous unreliable training methods opened a training School. Volunteers were called to fill posts as instructors and successful applicants were sent on a six-month course of tuition at various local police colleges to ensure they were fitted for the task.

== War Office/Army Department Constabulary ==
A War Office Constabulary post circa 1939

In 1925, with the abolition of No. 1 (Woolwich Arsenal) Division of the Metropolitan Police and after a wartime climate of hysteria over an alleged huge German spy network, it was found necessary for the Army to have a civilian police of its own principally for investigation. A force was formed under the auspices of that department which became known later as MI5. This was soon followed by the inauguration of a dedicated War Department Constabulary. This force derived its authority from various Acts of Parliament notably the Metropolitan Police Act 1860 (later expanded to cover Scotland) which states:

...may be authorised and specially sworn to execute the office of constable within all or any of Her Majesty's Dockyards, victualing yards, steam factory yards and in principle stations of the War Department in England and Wales and within 75 miles of such yards or station...with regard to property of the Crown or of persons subject to Naval, Marine or Military discipline

This Constabulary was responsible for the policing of some 60 stations throughout the UK for the War Office, plus a number of Ministry of Aviation Establishments, and also employed on certain other duties in London. The force was also responsible for security of the Royal Mint. The initial strength was 2100 but this was later reduced by the transfer of around 300 men to the newly formed Atomic Energy Authority Constabulary which took over the responsibility of Atomic Stations from the War Department Constabulary in 1954.

Applicants for the force were required to be Sergeants or above from the Army, or Corporals from the Royal Military Police. They were required to be of Exemplary Character, if possible to be in possession of the Long Service and Good Conduct Medal with a 22-year service pension. They were given a four-week training course before joining a station and were on three months’ probation, at the end of which they were required to pass an examination. Promotion up to Superintendent was from within the ranks of the force.

Where it was not possible to recruit regular constables, a small number of Auxiliary Police Constables, with lower qualifications on entry, and lower pay were employed. The Force was renamed "Army Department Constabulary" in 1964 when the War Office became The Army Department.

== The Air Ministry/Air Force Department Constabulary ==
Policing at airports and premises of the Air Ministry was originally the responsibility of the Metropolitan Police and local constabularies. The Special Constables Act 1923 saw the creation of a permanent Air Ministry Constabulary. In 1948, responsibility for civilian airports was transferred to the Ministry of Civil Aviation, and a new police force, the Ministry of Civil Aviation Constabulary was formed, leaving the Air Ministry Constabulary with responsibility for military airfields only. The Air Ministry was re-organised in 1964, and the force was renamed the Air Force Department Constabulary.

== Ministry of Defence Police ==
=== 1971: Ministry of Defence Police ===
The renaming of the Army and Air Force Departments from the War Office and the Air Ministry took place as the result of a decision to combine these departments together with the Admiralty (known now as the Navy Department) under the control of a new unified Ministry of Defence in 1965. This was natural evolution based on the experience gained in the Second World War (1939–1945) when the need for combined operations became obvious, and more than just a liaison between the three armed services was essential.

Amalgamation of the three separate departmental police forces into the new “Ministry of Defence Police (MDP)” followed in October 1971.

The 1970s and 1980s became busy periods for the new style MDP, as after the relatively quiet post World War Two period of the 1950s and 1960s, they now had to deal with the new and serious threat to Military and Defence establishments of Irish Republican Terrorism, from the Provisional Irish Republican Army (PIRA) and Irish National Liberation Army (INLA). Terrorists scored successes against a number of defence installations from the 1972 Aldershot Bombing to the 1989 Deal barracks bombing. It was very real threat of Irish Republican terrorism to the Defence Estate and personnel that became the MDPs main effort for 20 years and ensured that the MDP received a healthy budget from Government well into the late 1990s.

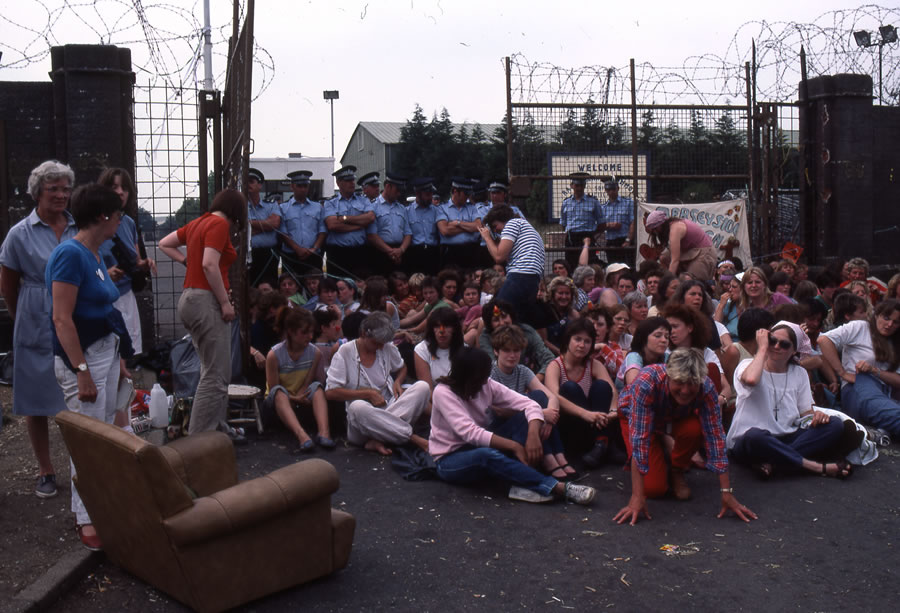
MDP face a protest from Peace Women at USAF Greenham Common in 1982

During the early 1980s the Campaign for Nuclear Disarmament, a British Anti-nuclear protest movement, which had been dormant since the late 1960s, enjoyed a surge in popularity. Driven by the real public fears of nuclear war between NATO and the Soviet Union. Most notable was the peace camp and very large protests against the deployment of US Cruise Missiles at the USAF (RAF) Greenham Common and other UK locations; and regular largescale protests at the Atomic Weapons Research Establishment Aldermaston.

When the MDP left the 1960s the force did little more than man gates, check passes and occasionally patrol fence lines armed with nothing more than a pistol. During the 1970s-1980s the force had to rapidly adapt to the changing threat of being faced with a determined terrorist enemy or dealing with large scale public anti-nuclear protests. By the end of the late 1980s the MDP was well equipped, all armed and trained to deal with the threats it faced, and comparable to other UK police forces.

Still, by the mid-1980s the majority of MDP tasking was ”behind the wire”, i.e. within the secure perimeters of the Defence establishments it policed. Increasingly the MDP was required to work outside the wire, to interdict terrorists before they attacked the establishment or securing Defence estate that the public had access to. The threat from the PIRA Improvised Mortar campaign of the 1980s was one of the driving factors that forced the issue that the MDP required a formal legislative framework to perform its duties outside the wire; and more extensive police powers, in what later became the Ministry of Defence Police Act 1987

=== 1974: Female police officers ===
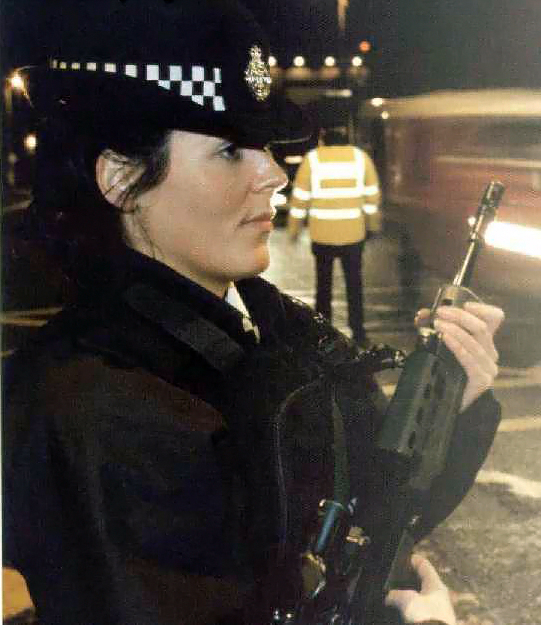
Female MDP Officer on duty with L85A1 Assault Rifle

Despite HDPFs having female police officers since 1915, there were no female police officers in the MDP until 1974. In that year two female sergeants transferred into the MDP, one from Strathclyde Police and one from British Airports Police.

The first four female MDP recruits started their training on recruit course in January 1975. Skirts and tunics had to be made to measure for them as there was no stock of female uniforms held. They were issued with truncheons, but they found that they had no pockets to put them in. At this time trousers were not issued to female officers and rent allowance was only paid at half rate.

The present day force has over 340 female officers.

=== 1987: Ministry of Defence Police Act ===
Because the MDP derived its powers from a growing number of acts and regulations, it was recognised that there was a need for one specific piece of legislation to cover the MDP and its legally unique role in policing the Defence Estate.

As a result, in 1987, the force was recognised by Parliament as a distinct police force which resulted in an Act of Parliament, the Ministry of Defence Police Act 1987, this drew many of the powers from the old acts and regulations under the umbrella of one piece of legislation, making them clearer to understand and work from.

All officers within the MDP are now attested as constables as laid down within Section 1 (2) of the Ministry of Defence Police Act 1987 and are granted the "Powers and privileges of Constables" in any place in the UK with their jurisdiction.

=== 1996: Agency status ===
On 1 April 1996 the Ministry of Defence Police became a Defence Agency. This was a landmark in the MDP's history as it was the first British police to become an agency.

The MDP was formally launched as an Agency on 24 April 1996 by the Hon. Nicholas Soames, Minister of State for the Armed Forces. The Agency operated under the Secretary of State for Defence, who has ultimate responsibility for determining the size, policy and resources of the force. These responsibilities were delegated to the Second Permanent Under-Secretary of State who was also Chairman of the MOD Police Committee.

The Chief Constable has the exclusive statutory authority for the professional direction and control of all MDP officers and also direct access to the Secretary for Defence, to whom he is ultimately responsible. Additionally, the Chief Constable is responsible to Parliament for the propriety and regularity of the agency's expenditure in compliance with Treasury and Departmental rules.

The MDP Agency provisions were reframed on the formation of the Ministry of Defence Police and Guarding Agency.

In 1995 the MDP moved its headquarters and training centre to the recently vacated USAF Airbase at RAF Wethersfield.

=== 2000 - 2009: Extended jurisdiction, Al-Qaeda and enhanced capability ===
Under the Ministry of Defence Police Act 1987, MDP officers had the powers of police constables, but-broadly speaking only on Defence land or in respect of the actions of Defence personnel. In addition they had constabulary powers when requested to act by an officer from a Home Department police force (HDPF) "in the vicinity" of Defence land. The problem was that these powers left MDP officers unable to act in an emergency if confronted by serious criminal acts off defence land, and failed to define the term "in the vicinity". Or give powers to deal with offences against Defence personnel off Defence land, nor to act under certain sections of the Terrorism Act 2000.

Because of the rapid evolution of the role of the MDP from purely "guarding behind the wire" to more mobile policing of the Defence Estate and Defence interests. The Chief Constable MDP lobbied for additional powers to give the force a more robust legislative framework. This was agreed in principle by Government; to be included in the Armed Forces Bill 2000, but was eventually dropped because of lack of Parliamentary time.

The requested extra powers were resurrected and put before Parliament in 2001, due (according to The Guardian and The Independent newspapers) because of the events of the fuel protests of 2000, which brought the UK to a standstill in 2000. The Labour government under Prime Minister Tony Blair planned to use the MDP to aid fuel convoys and police picketed oil refineries, but the government was told that it would be unlawful under the then legislation to do so. The additional powers, subsequently known as ‘Extended Jurisdiction’, were then included in the Anti-Terrorism, Crime and Security (ATCS) Act 2001.

Despite ‘Extended Jurisdiction’ the MDP still do not, with notable exceptions such as garrison towns, police the public directly. But on a daily basis they provide mutual support to territorial forces and deal with the full range of crime encountered. In many garrison towns there is joint policing between MDP and the HDPF.

This has caused an anomaly in which the MDP classify crimes as "primary" (defence related) and "secondary" (not defence related) crime for the purposes of statistics (not response levels). Secondary crime, if dealt with by an MDP officer, is still counted by the local force for their crime statistics.

Because of the political sensitivity of Extended Jurisdiction and the result of the fuel protest plans; the Chief Constable MDP issued a directive that stands today: “that MDP will not provide public order officers on mutual aid, to police protest that does not directly involve Defence interests, unless there is grave risk of loss of life”. (This does not include providing specialist MDP Protester Removal Teams).

Shortly after Extended Jurisdiction came into force, the US September 11 attacks completely changed the national security landscape and al-Qaeda/Islamist terrorism became the MDP's principal threat. The MDP already extensively “working outside the wire” formed a number of Area Police Teams (APT), which were teams of mobile officers who would undertake mobile armed counter-terrorism patrols and local crime surge operations of the Defence Estate and defence interests. Prior to this, the force had been organised around Operational Command Units (OCU) based on static Defence locations. The APTs were never adequately funded and quickly, due to pressure on the Defence Budget in 2004, by both the Iraq and Afghanistan campaigns, these teams were rationalised to work at Divisional not Area level and became known as Divisional Support Groups (DSG) a role which continues today.

On the 7 July 2005 London bombings the UK was hit by directly by Islamist terrorism. Already before that incident the MDP had begun a programme of transformation of its uniformed assets known as 'enhanced capability'. This was a program of modernisation, re-equipping and training to concentrate on the new threats to UK national security and to perform the force's primary role: armed security and counter-terrorism. The acquisition of the Heckler & Koch MP7 as the new force weapon came from this programme, because of the requirement to penetrate body armour.

Traditional MDP tasks such as unarmed guarding had long since been handed over to the MOD Guard Service and armed guarding which does not require constabulary powers handed to the Military Provost Guard Service. Leaving the MDP to concentrate on specialist armed policing operations such as those surrounding nuclear weapon security and movement; or threats to critical national infrastructure. Responding to specific threats in 2007 MDP deployed to protect St Fergus in Scotland; Bacton in Norfolk and Easington in East Yorkshire Gas Intake stations from terrorist attack, they remain there today.

Where purely unarmed constabulary powers are required it is dealt with by a DSG or by (a relatively new role) Defence Community Police Officers.

=== 2004: Ministry of Defence Police and Guarding Agency ===
The existing MDP Agency was then expanded in 2004 to include the uniformed MOD Guard Service (MGS) and renamed the "Ministry of Defence Police and Guarding Agency" (MDPGA), the agency currently incorporates the two main physical security services within the MOD. In the same year RAF Wethersfield was renamed MDPGA Wethersfield.

As a result of cuts made to the UK defence budget arising from the Strategic Defence and Security Review 2010; on 1 April 2013 the MDPGA was disbanded. The MDP returned to standalone police force status. The MGS was cut heavily and became part of the new Defence Infrastructure Organisation.

=== 2010: Austerity, and the Strategic Defence and Security Review ===
After the 2010 general election the UK Coalition Government, instigated a Strategic Defence and Security Review (SDSR). The government pledged to apply an austerity agenda on public spending and to significantly cut MoD civilian jobs. In the event, the SDSR ordered a cut of 25,000 (from 65,000) posts in the MoD.

Before the SDSR the MDP had already been subject to two major reviews: the Hutchison review into Defence Business Resilience, and the Woolley report into MDP officer's terms and conditions of service.

In March 2012 in a written statement to Parliament, Defence Personnel Minister Andrew Robathan said "he regretted the uncertainty and anxiety caused to staff affected, but said the Government 'can and will' make changes in guarding and civil policing". Under the measures announced, the MDP is to downsize from a current strength of just under 3,100 to about 2,400 by April 2016.

In April 2012 the MDP reduced its command structure from five geographic divisions, into two functional divisions. 'Nuclear Division' and 'Territorial Division'.
