= Royal Marine Police =

1934–1949 police force in the UK

Department overview
- Formed: 1934
- Dissolved: 1949
- Superseding Department: Ministry of Defence Police
- Jurisdiction: Government of the United Kingdom
- Headquarters: Admiralty Building Whitehall London
- Department executive: Chief Constable, Royal Marine Police
- Parent Department: Admiralty; Navy Department (Ministry of Defence)

The Royal Marine Police (RMP) was a police force in the United Kingdom formed under the Special Constables Act 1923 which existed from 1934 to 1949.

== History ==
The Constabulary can trace its history back to 1686 when the Royal Navy needed an organisation to prevent dockyard crime. So the Secretary to the Admiralty - Samuel Pepys, the diarist - formed a force of 'porters, rounders, warders and watchmen' to guard the Naval Yards. Porters identified and escorted visitors, rounders patrolled the yard, warders were responsible for the keys and backed up the porters at the gates, and the part-time watchmen guarded buildings and areas by night.

In 1834 this force became the first dockyard police, with full police powers within the dockyards, and acting as policemen over offences committed by employees and Naval personnel within a radius of five miles of the yard. Rewards for obtaining convictions quickly led to corruption, so the force was 'cleaned up' and then abolished. In 1860 dockyard divisions of the Metropolitan Police took over and senior Naval officers became magistrates. From 1923 onwards the Metropolitan Police presence began to be replaced by Royal Marines appointed as special constables under the Special Constables Act 1923. No. 3 (Devonport) Division was the last of these six divisions to be pulled out, leaving in 1934, the year which also saw the formal formation of the Royal Marine Police.

== Ranks ==
Royal Marine Police	Relative rank	Admiralty Civil Police New rank titles from 1942
Chief Constable	Colonel, R.M.	n/a
Superintendent	Major, R.M	n/a
Chief Inspector	Captain, R.M	n/a
Sub-Divisional Inspector	Warrant Officer, R.M	n/a
Station Sergeant	n/a	Station Sergeant (Note: New rank as of 1942)
Sergeant	n/a	Sergeant (Note: Previously Senior Warder and Chief Warder)
Constable	n/a	Constable (Note: Previously Warder)

== Sources ==
- Button, Mark (2012). Private Policing. Oxford, England: Routledge. ISBN 9781135997557.
- Focus on the Ministry of Defence Police (MDP), QuestOnline
- Hind, Bob (24 April 2016). "In days when the Admiralty ran its own police force". The News.
- Ministry of Defence Police Bill [Lords] (Hansard, 27 January 1987)". hansard.millbanksystems.com. Hansard, vol 109 cc276-85. Retrieved 13 March 2018.

== See also ==
- Law enforcement in the United Kingdom
- List of defunct law enforcement agencies in the United Kingdom
- Department of Defense Police
