= List of police forces of the United Kingdom =

This is a list of the 45 territorial police forces and 3 special police forces of the United Kingdom. It does not include non-police law enforcement agencies or bodies of constables not constituted as police forces.

For a list of all law enforcement agencies in the United Kingdom and its territories, see List of law enforcement agencies in the United Kingdom, Crown Dependencies and British Overseas Territories.

Map of the 45 territorial police areas in the UK

== Table ==
Force	Area served	Number of police officers	Budget (millions)	Area size (km^{2})	Formed	Country/Region	Legal jurisdiction	Type
Avon and Somerset Police	Unitary authorities of Bath and North East Somerset, Bristol, North Somerset, Somerset and South Gloucestershire	3,202	£326.6	4,777	1974	South West England	England and Wales	Territorial police force
Bedfordshire Police	Unitary authorities of Bedford, Central Bedfordshire, and Luton	1,396	£122.5	1,024 km^{2} (395 sq mi)	1966	East of England	England and Wales	Territorial police force
British Transport Police	National Rail Network, London Underground, Docklands Light Railway, West Midlands Metro, London Trams, Tyne and Wear Metro (part), Glasgow Subway and London Cable car	2,960	£319.17	200	1948 as BTCP		On railway land (and also other areas upon request by another police force, and in certain other circumstances) in England, Wales, and Scotland	Special police force
Cambridgeshire Constabulary	County of Cambridgeshire and unitary authority of Peterborough	1,671	£156.2	3,389	1965	East of England	England and Wales	Territorial police force
Cheshire Constabulary	Unitary authorities of Cheshire East, Cheshire West and Chester, Halton, and Warrington	2,370	£208.0	2,155	1857	North West England	England and Wales	Territorial police force
City of London Police	City of London	970	£67.0	2.6	1839	Greater London	England and Wales	Territorial police force
Civil Nuclear Constabulary	Civilian nuclear facilities: Dounreay, Torness, Hunterston, Hartlepool, Sellafield, Heysham, Sizewell, Culham, Harwell, Hinkley Point, Dungeness	1,310 (Note: Number of police officers as of November 2016.)	£116.7	-	2005		Civilian nuclear sites and surrounding lands up to 5 km distant, and any such places as required when escorting nuclear materials in transit or pursuing or detaining suspects in England, Wales, Scotland and Northern Ireland	Special police force
Cleveland Police	Unitary authorities of Hartlepool, Middlesbrough, Redcar and Cleveland, and Stockton-on-Tees	1,443	£143.5	597	1974	North East England	England and Wales	Territorial police force
Cumbria Constabulary	Unitary authorities of Cumberland and Westmorland and Furness	1,288	£117.8	6,768	1974	North West England	England and Wales	Territorial police force
Derbyshire Constabulary	County of Derbyshire and unitary authority of Derby	2,038	£193.9	2,625	1967	East Midlands	England and Wales	Territorial police force
Devon and Cornwall Police	County of Devon and unitary authorities of Cornwall, the Isles of Scilly, Plymouth, and Torbay	3,515	£338.4	10,270	1967	South West England	England and Wales	Territorial police force
Dorset Police	Unitary authorities of Dorset and Bournemouth, Christchurch and Poole	1,380	£144.3	2,653	1974	South West England	England and Wales	Territorial police force
Durham Constabulary	Unitary authorities of County Durham and Darlington	1,295	£133.3	2,676	1839	North East England	England and Wales	Territorial police force
Dyfed-Powys Police	Principal areas of Carmarthenshire, Ceredigion, Pembrokeshire, and Powys	1,275	£115.5	10,976	1968	Wales	England and Wales	Territorial police force
Essex Police	County of Essex and unitary authorities of Southend-on-Sea and Thurrock	3,678	£320.2	3,670	1969	East of England	England and Wales	Territorial police force
Gloucestershire Constabulary	County of Gloucestershire	1,279	£126.9	3,150	1839	South West England	England and Wales	Territorial police force
Greater Manchester Police	Metropolitan county of Greater Manchester	8,550	£643.0	1,276	1974	North West England	England and Wales	Territorial police force
Gwent Police	Principal areas of Blaenau Gwent, Caerphilly, Monmouthshire, Newport, and Torfaen	1,491	£142.2	1,555	1967	Wales	England and Wales	Territorial police force
Hampshire and Isle of Wight Constabulary	County of Hampshire and unitary authorities of the Isle of Wight, Portsmouth, and Southampton	3,302	£366.4	4,149	1967	South East England	England and Wales	Territorial police force
Hertfordshire Constabulary	County of Hertfordshire	2,261	£221.3	1,643	1841	East of England	England and Wales	Territorial police force
Humberside Police	Unitary authorities of East Riding of Yorkshire, Kingston upon Hull, North East Lincolnshire, and North Lincolnshire	2,192	£200.7	3,517	1974	Yorkshire and the Humber	England and Wales	Territorial police force
Kent Police	County of Kent and unitary authority of Medway	4,064	£338.4	3,736	1857	South East England	England and Wales	Territorial police force
Lancashire Constabulary	County of Lancashire and unitary authorities of Blackburn with Darwen and Blackpool	3,369	£308.8	3,075	1839	North West England	England and Wales	Territorial police force
Leicestershire Police	County of Leicestershire and unitary authorities of Leicester and Rutland	2,335	£204.0	2,538	1967	East Midlands	England and Wales	Territorial police force
Lincolnshire Police	County of Lincolnshire	1,182	£131.6	5,921	1856	East Midlands	England and Wales	Territorial police force
Merseyside Police	Metropolitan county of Merseyside	4,093	£359.7	645	1974	North West England	England and Wales	Territorial police force
Metropolitan Police Service	Metropolitan Police District (London region excluding the City of London)	35,052	£2,939.9	1,578	1829	Greater London	England and Wales (includes Scotland and Northern Ireland for officers on close protection duties)	Territorial police force
Ministry of Defence Police	Critical Defence Sites, Designated Critical National Infrastructure, MOD Headquarters Whitehall, Trident, Atomic Weapons Establishment, GCHQ	2,594 (Note: Number of police officers is measured as full-time equivalent (FTE) for 31 March 2017.)	£156.6	-	1971		Military buildings, property, and employees (as well as other areas upon request by another police force, and in certain other circumstances), in England, Wales, Scotland and Northern Ireland	Special police force
Norfolk Constabulary	County of Norfolk	1,921	£177.2	5,371	1839	East of England	England and Wales	Territorial police force
North Wales Police	Principal areas of Anglesey, Conwy, Denbighshire, Flintshire, Gwynedd, and Wrexham	1,652	£167.1	6,172	1974	Wales	England and Wales	Territorial police force
Northamptonshire Police	Unitary authorities of North Northamptonshire and West Northamptonshire	1,458	£146.2	2,364	1966	East Midlands	England and Wales	Territorial police force
Northumbria Police	Metropolitan county of Tyne and Wear and unitary authority of Northumberland	3,658	£307.1	5,553	1974	North East England	England and Wales	Territorial police force
North Yorkshire Police	Unitary authorities of North Yorkshire and the City of York	1,669	£166.2	8,310	1974	Yorkshire and the Humber	England and Wales	Territorial police force
Nottinghamshire Police	County of Nottinghamshire and unitary authority of Nottingham	2,401	£224.8	2,160	1968	East Midlands	England and Wales	Territorial police force
Police Service of Northern Ireland	Northern Ireland	6,772	£1,077.4	13,843	2001	Northern Ireland	Northern Ireland	Territorial police force
Police Service of Scotland	Scotland	16,570	£1,064.8	78,772	2013	Scotland	Scotland	Territorial police force
South Wales Police	Principal areas of Bridgend, Cardiff, Merthyr Tydfil, Neath Port Talbot, Rhondda Cynon Taf, Swansea, and the Vale of Glamorgan	3,397	£315.8	2,074	1969	Wales	England and Wales	Territorial police force
South Yorkshire Police	Metropolitan county of South Yorkshire	3,022	£282.1	1,552	1974	Yorkshire and the Humber	England and Wales	Territorial police force
Staffordshire Police	County of Staffordshire and unitary authority of Stoke-on-Trent	1,913	£211.1	2,713	1968	West Midlands	England and Wales	Territorial police force
Suffolk Constabulary	County of Suffolk	1,387	£135.1	3,801	1967	East of England	England and Wales	Territorial police force
Surrey Police	County of Surrey	2,153	£249.4	1,663	1851	South East England	England and Wales	Territorial police force
Sussex Police	Non-metropolitan counties of East Sussex and West Sussex and unitary authority of Brighton and Hove	3,051	£309.9	3,783	1968	South East England	England and Wales	Territorial police force
Thames Valley Police	Non-metropolitan counties of Buckinghamshire and Oxfordshire and unitary authorities of Bracknell Forest, Milton Keynes, Reading, Slough, Wokingham, West Berkshire, and Windsor and Maidenhead	4,772	£456.7	5,742	1968	South East England	England and Wales	Territorial police force
Warwickshire Police	County of Warwickshire	1,029	£109.9	1,975	1840	West Midlands	England and Wales	Territorial police force
West Mercia Police	County of Worcestershire and unitary authorities of Herefordshire, Shropshire, and Telford and Wrekin	2,358	£236.5	7,408	1967	West Midlands	England and Wales	Territorial police force
West Midlands Police	Metropolitan county of the West Midlands	7,715	£620.4	902	1974	West Midlands	England and Wales	Territorial police force
West Yorkshire Police	Metropolitan county of West Yorkshire	5,930	£485.0	2,029	1974	Yorkshire and the Humber	England and Wales	Territorial police force
Wiltshire Police	Unitary authorities of Swindon and Wiltshire	1,138	£127.7	3,485	1839	South West England	England and Wales	Territorial police force
Total	—	174,415	£15,832	—	—		—	—

== List of special police forces ==
- British Transport Police
- Civil Nuclear Constabulary
- Ministry of Defence Police

== See also ==
- List of defunct law enforcement agencies in the United Kingdom
- Law enforcement in the United Kingdom
