= Project Servator =

United Kingdom police deployment strategy

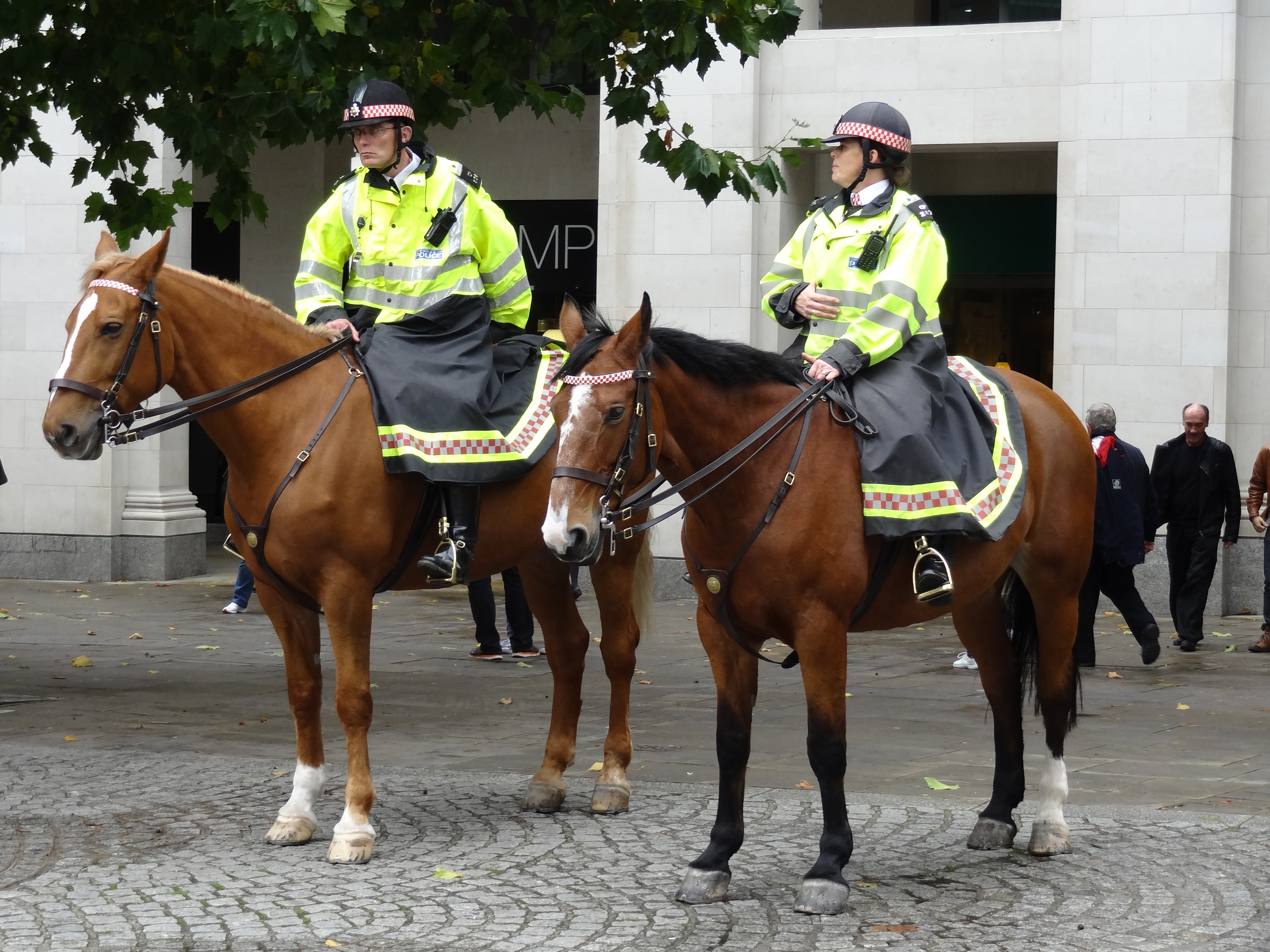
Mounted City of London Police

Project Servator is a crime deterrence and surveillance tactic used by UK police, based around public engagement and unannounced, highly visible police deployments. Project Servator deployments are characterized by the use a range of policing assets - dogs, mounted branch, firearms, plain clothes – in an unpredictable way. Simultaneously, local residents and staff are encouraged to be vigilant and report any suspicions to the police, through public engagement campaigns involving training for local business employees and posters targeted towards the public.

Project Servator police deployments were originally introduced by the City of London Police in February 2014 as "New policing tactics to deter and detect criminal and terrorist activity, as well as to reassure the general public". Project Servator has since been adopted by British Transport Police, Police Scotland, Essex Police, Ministry of Defence Police the Civil Nuclear Constabulary and the Metropolitan Police. The police have used Project Servator tactics in London, on the national rail network and at the 2014 Commonwealth Games in Glasgow, V Festival and shopping centres.Research indicates that visible policing makes the public feel more reassured and Project Servator arrest figures show it has been effective in identifying criminals.

== Overview ==
In February 2014, in response to the public perception of increased levels of crime and the threat of international terrorism the City of London Police launched a new public policing initiative called 'Servator' or 'Project Servator.''Project Servator' is an inclusive collaborative community strategy that aims to protect local areas and build upon the safety and security plans already in place to ensure safety and security. It is based on a partnership approach, where the police engage local communities and businesses, encouraging vigilance among residents and staff working in that area. Police seek to work closely with as many parts of the community as possible and briefings often include; local pubs and retailers, bus, rail or taxi firms and their drivers and homeless hostels.

Project Servator's approach is the highly visible and unpredictable deployments of police assets. These may be the deployment of specially trained officers – uniformed and plain-clothes, dogs, horses coupled with the heightened use of CCTV. It involves increasing existing levels of community engagement, to encourage people to be vigilant and to report anything suspicious. It has included media engagement, poster advertisements in transport hubs or in roadside and telephone boxes, as well as leaflets placed in shops and cafes. In each case, the police force concerned, provides the public with telephone numbers to call if they see anything suspicious.

The aim of Servator is to make the police footprint very visible and very obvious.

Project Servator may involve using undercover officers trained in behavioural analysis to spot people who might be scoping out sites for a potential terrorist attack, referred to as 'hostile reconnaissance'. Officers receive training to notice the subtle, sometimes unconscious ways in which people behave differently when they are stressed or anxious, with an aim to identify those who may be conducting those who may be carrying out 'hostile reconnaissance. People displaying signs of nervousness are approached, or stopped, and questioned and if the officers become even more suspicious, they can then use their 'stop and search' powers.

== Background ==
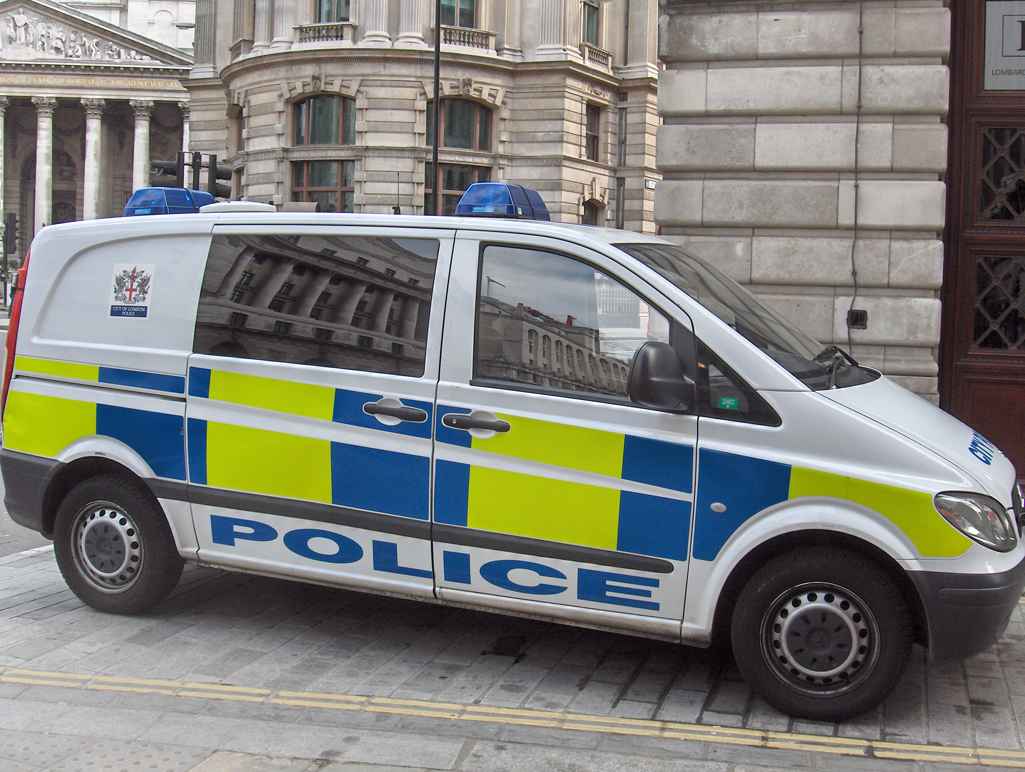
City of London Police Van

The planning, research and development behind Project Servator comes from three years of work with the National Protective Security Authority (NPSA), as part of its role to reduce the vulnerability of the national infrastructure to terrorism and other threats and to help protect public places; and with the City of London Police, who developed an initial Servator pilot scheme.

Cranfield University helped provide the research to evaluate the impact of Servator as part of its role to reduce the vulnerability of the national infrastructure to terrorism and other threats and to help protect public places. The most significant threat comes from international terrorism with its ambitions to mount high impact attacks combining mass casualties with substantial disruption to vital services such as energy, transport and communications. Cranfield University's Professor Paul Baines said: "In psychology, reciprocity is a powerful mechanism. Most of us can relate to the idea that if we receive something from someone, we feel almost a need to 'return the favour', and are likely to do so." Heightened public awareness of a potential threat is perceived as a 'favour' as it is protecting the public from danger. So the "UK police forces…use the notion of a favour/fear appeal to offer benefit to citizens and thereby encourage them to report suspicious activity." Project Servator's growing prominence in the public mind seeks to enable police to better "tactically engage with the public, 'by recruiting' them, and by encouraging them to be vigilant and more eager to report suspicious behaviour." Professor Baines has spoken about the importance of "reassurance communications" by the police as an important aspect of encouraging the public to report suspicious activity.

Cranfield University recently provided an assessment of Project Servator and concludes that police reassurance communications (RComms), branded as Servator, inform, reassure and recruit the general public (and potentially deter criminals/terrorists). The communications are designed as a social marketing campaign that uses a partnership approach with the local community. [Rosengren, Baines (2016). Case Insight 17.1 City of London Police. Oxford University Press. p. 650. ISBN 9780198748533.]

=== Surveillance ===
The police have used information campaigns to support the deployments. An example of Professor Paul Baines’ psychological approach of reassurance communications, is one of the poster headlines that reads "We love rush hour, it gives us 300,000 extra pairs of eyes". Discussing this poster, the magazine of the creative industry, the Drum writes "It employs public information and deterrence communications techniques. The core emotive colours of red, white and black provoke an emotional response and distinguish the posters – even in busy environments. And the strapline 'Together, we've got it covered' makes the overall message inclusive while also sending a warning to criminals or malicious individuals."

The Mayor of London echoed the same "eyes and ears" message. Sadiq Khan said "Nothing is more important to me than keeping Londoners safe. As a father of two daughters, I worry about my family going about our city just as I worry about all Londoners." This was said as part of his press statement when he attended a Servator deployment at Liverpool Street linked to his terror preparedness review.

The introduction of anti-terrorism police patrol units was announced by Scotland Yard on 28 November 2016.

== Impact ==
The City of London Police consider Servator a success, and attribute this to a more scientific approach to behaviour detection.

Between February 2014 and June 2016, City of London Police officers on Servator deployments carried out a total of 738 searches. Of these, 442 searches proved positive, resulting in 403 arrests and 171 vehicle seizures, with drug offences being the most common. This was considered to be an improvement from 20 to 68 per cent.

== Use of tactics within London ==
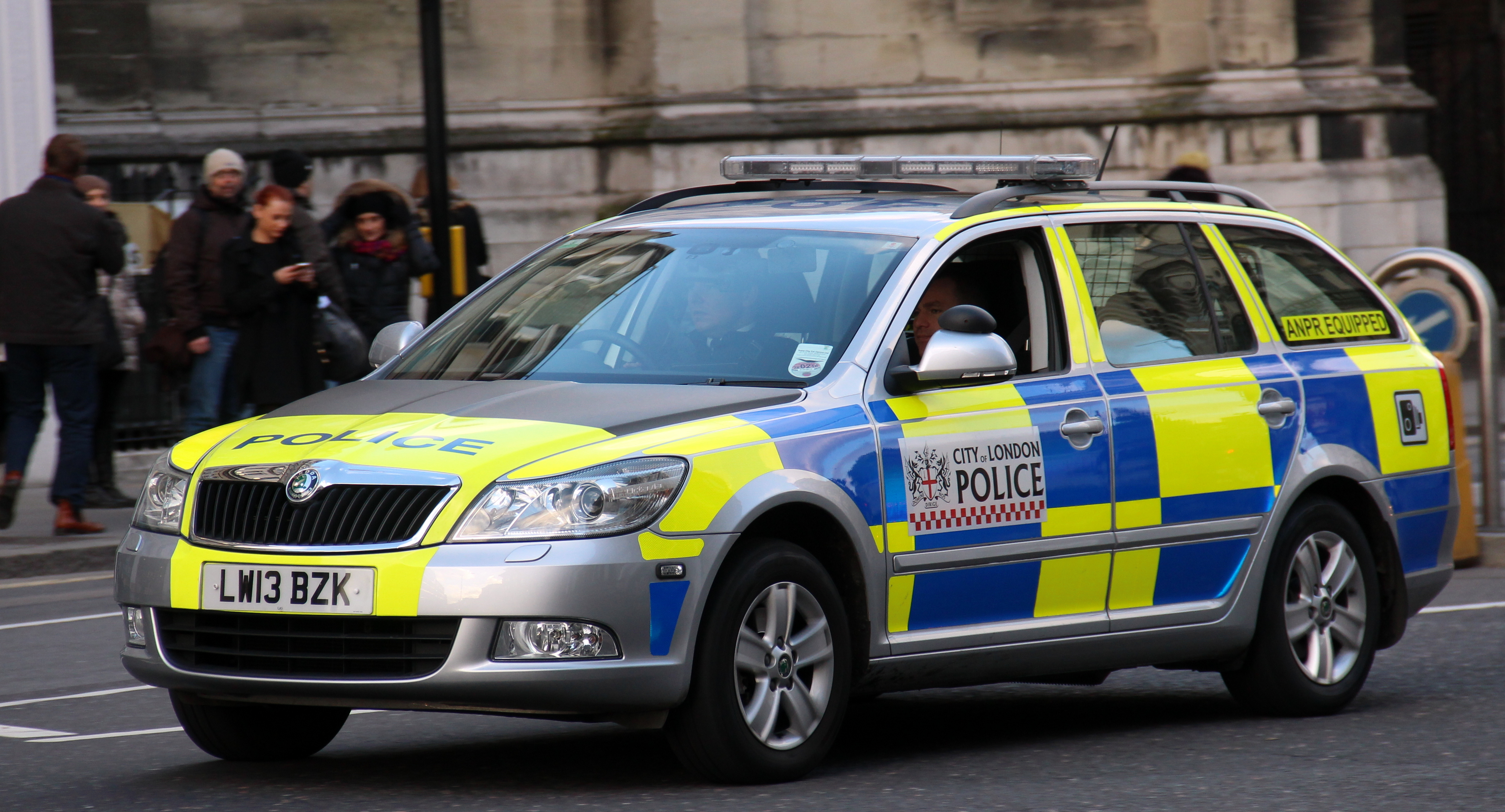
City of London Police

Project Servator was first launched in the City of London (the business district of Greater London) by the City of London Police in February 2014.Project Servator was put into action in the rest of London by the Metropolitan Police in November 2016. This deterrence is in the form of unpredictable, irregular deployment of plainclothes officers, the use of dogs, boat units and other forms of territorial police support. Scotland Yard stressed the move was not in response to a specific threat, however, in 2017, following a bomb on the District Line train at Parsons Green, there had been a government promise to enhance police presence in areas across London.

An additional objective of these deployments by trained officers is the desire to encourage people to become extra eyes and ears for the police. The police want to persuade them to readily report any suspicious behaviour that they may see. One such example came in August 2017, when the Met Police Task Force, working with British Transport Police, made a major swoop at Stratford station and seized a long bread knife, a hammer and an imitation gun. The photographs of the weapons taken off those detained were shared on social media and the story was covered by both the national press and on Twitter. Publicity of the arrests and the sharing of the weapon images on social media was expected to reinforce public confidence and increase the likelihood of people calling in intelligence on suspicious behaviour which Project Servator teams can then act upon.

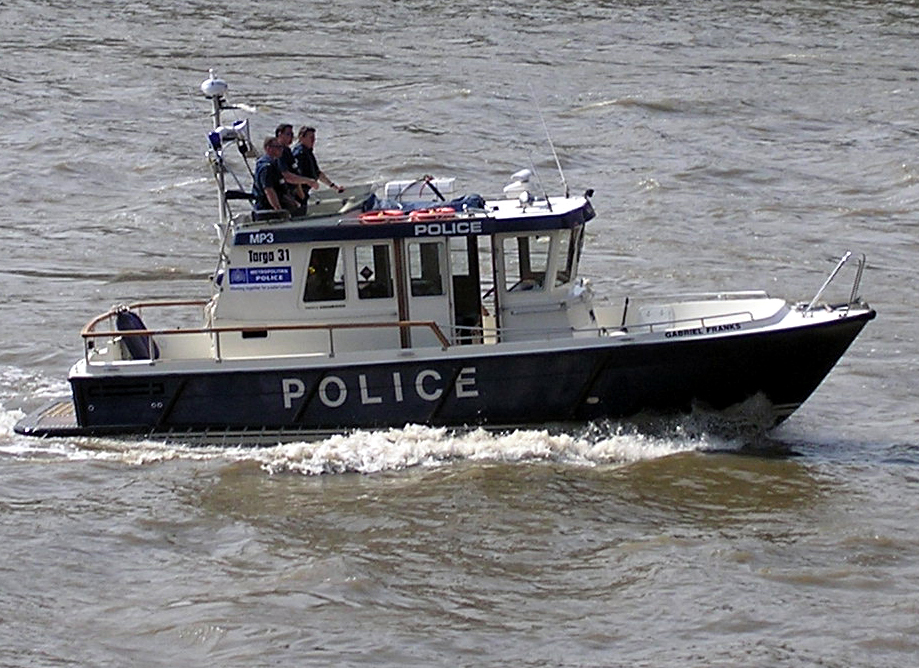
Police boat on the Thames

Project Servator has also played an important role in building public trust and support during 2016 and 2017 as several terrorist attacks hit London. In late 2016, officers were patrolling London boroughs looking for signs of suspicious activity as part of Project Servator deployments and police in London were doing so again as part of Operation Temperer, which began shortly after the Manchester Arena terrorist attack in May 2017. Additionally, Project Servator means a greater police presence is in place at transport hubs in east London with London City Airport seeing Project Servator deployments in and around the airport.

In March 2016 it was announced that an extra £1.6 million a year would be raised by City firms for anti-terror measures to protect the capital's financial centre. The funds were to support more armed police, collaboration with businesses, community groups and other organisations on protective security and the further development of Project Servator.

== Use of tactics outside London ==
Since the international terrorism threat level was raised to severe in 2014, Project Servator tactics have been used on several occasions: the 2014 Commonwealth Games in Glasgow, V Festival, Intu Lakeside and One New Change also at transport hubs nationally, and around critical national infrastructure as well as around military sites such as Sellafield Aldermaston and HMNB Portsmouth, Naval Base by the Ministry of Defence Police

Terrorist attacks in Paris in 2015 and Brussels in 2016, have led to forces in other urban areas, such as the Metropolitan Police Service and Greater Manchester Police, to examine the potential of Servator as a police scheme to heighten public awareness and strengthen public security. On 7 November 2016, Project Servator launched at London Stansted Airport with Essex Police aiming to set up highly visible, yet unpredictable, police deployments designed to disrupt and deter criminal activity in and around the airport. Servator was planned to be used to improve security at some of Britain's biggest train stations and high-profile buildings.

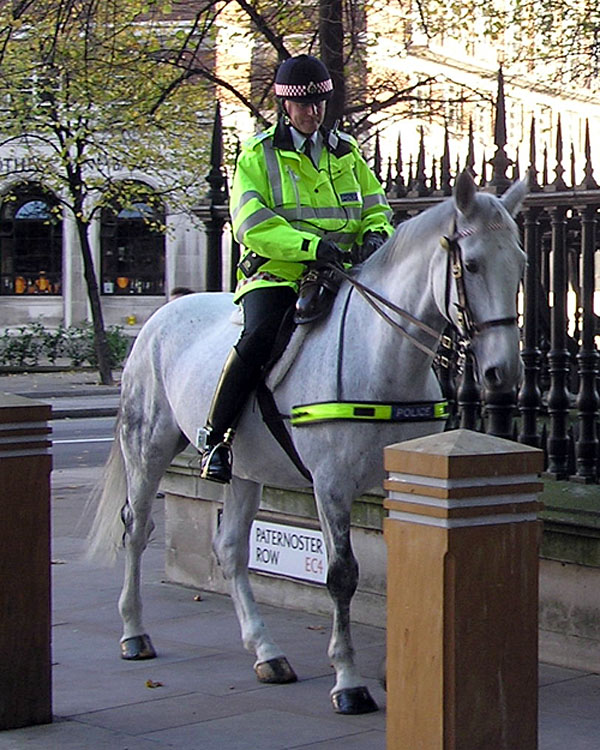
Mounted Police

=== Essex ===
In the summer of 2017, Project Servator was launched at Lakeside shopping centre and Stansted Airport and was intended to operate across the county. Supt. Adrian Coombs, Essex Police commander at Stansted Airport: "One of the key element of Project Servator is unpredictability, so don't be surprised if you see a visible police presence pop up at various times and locations across the whole airport using different resources."

Essex Police has adopted a range of tactics to support its Servator deployments throughout the county. The tactics include things that the public can observe:high visibility police, drones and firearms officers who engage with the public, dogs, CCTV and helicopters as well as things they can't observe, such as plain-clothes officers. Essex Police works with partners, stakeholders and other forces at Lakeside and the airport to keep those areas safe and to prevent all types of crime, from the high level organised crime down to shoplifting. At Stansted Airport, a full-time team is deployed - both in the terminal – airside and landside - and in and around the perimeter. So one moment the Essex Police may be seen at a Plane Spotters gathering at Stansted Airport, then they could pop up policing inside the Stansted Terminal building itself.

November 2017 saw the launch of Project Servator deployments in and around Colchester. Essex Police in Colchester is working with security staff, retailers and Colchester Council's zone teams. The Essex Police said this is about reassurance, community involvement and keeping people safe in a garrison town with a military presence, the objective being to deter both potential criminal and terrorist activity throughout the town.

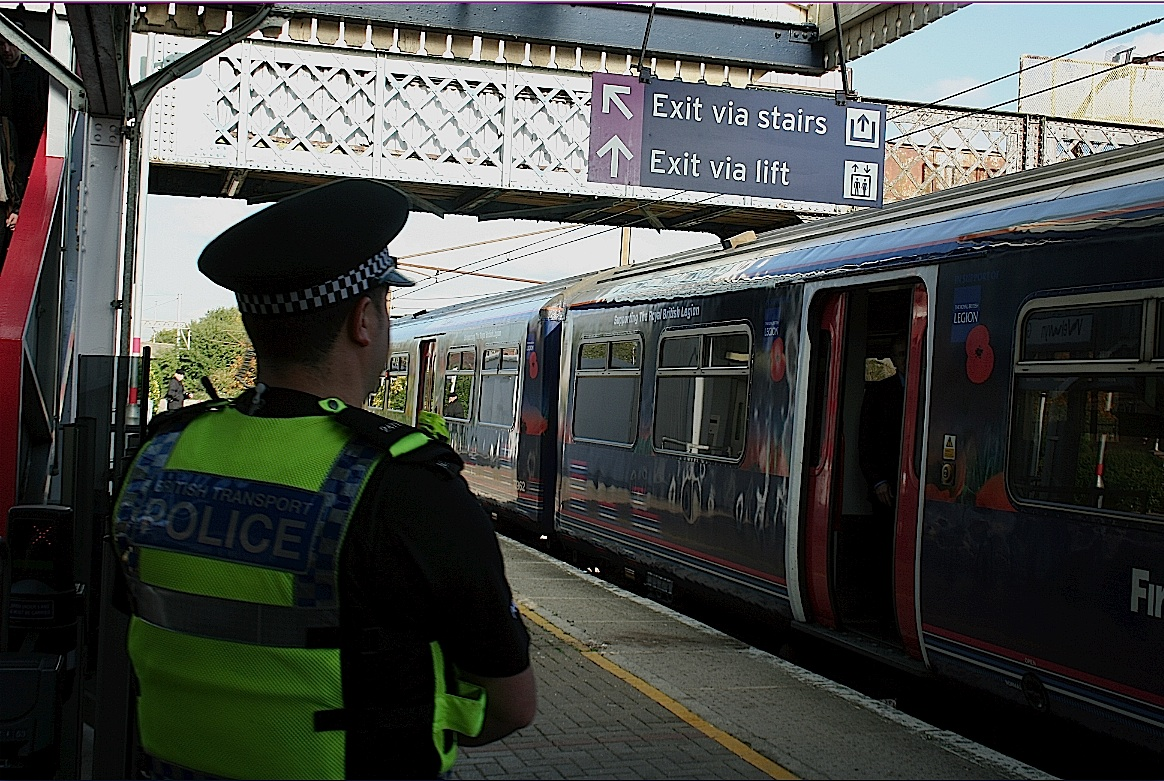
Security on UK Rail Network

=== North Yorkshire ===
The North Yorkshire Police announced implementation of Project Servator policing methods in April 2017. The launch had been in the planning since 2016 with the decision to launch in April being based on Project Servator's successful adoption by Police Scotland at the 2014 Commonwealth Games and a more recent pilot project by the local North Yorkshire Police.

Project Servator in North Yorkshire is aimed at protecting crowded places, key locations and events from criminal and terrorist activity. It was launched in York to be then rolled out across the county. The tactics involve the use of visible and covert police officers, firearms, Automatic number-plate recognition, air support, mounted officers and CCTV cameras.

On 16 May 2017, North Yorkshire Police extended Project Servator deployments to patrolling key areas of Catterick, home to Europe's largest military base, when uniformed and undercover officers took to the streets of Catterick to mark the project's launch.

On 23 August 2017, to mark the first anniversary since launch North Yorkshire Police have produced a video showing the work of Project Servator. The force explained the purpose of the video is to assist 'those who are not aware of Project Servator' and it 'introduces businesses and the local community to the concept of Project Servator and explains the important role businesses and the community have to play in making this project a success.'

=== Scotland ===
Police Scotland used Project Servator in the lead up to and during the course of the Edinburgh International and Fringe Festival 2017. Project Servator was also used at the 2014 Commonwealth Games in Scotland, where organizers described Project Servator as a '10,000-strong army of police, military and security personnel to protect fans and athletes during Games.'

=== Sellafield ===
Since 2016, Project Servator has been used at Sellafield Ltd to protect the facility and the surrounding areas. Like Servator in urban areas, it uses a combination of visible and non-visible tactics in an unpredictable way to deter criminal threats. The police tactics being used are overt, covert and firearms officers, dogs and vehicles which are complemented with Sellafield Limited's operational security and community vigilance in and around the site. CNC Officers have also given presentations about Servator to local schools and colleges and community groups.

== Ministry of Defence ==
Project Servator is also used by the Ministry of Defence Police (the MDP). Following trials at the Atomic Weapons Establishment and Her Majesty's Naval Base (HMDB) Portsmouth the new policing initiative has been introduced.

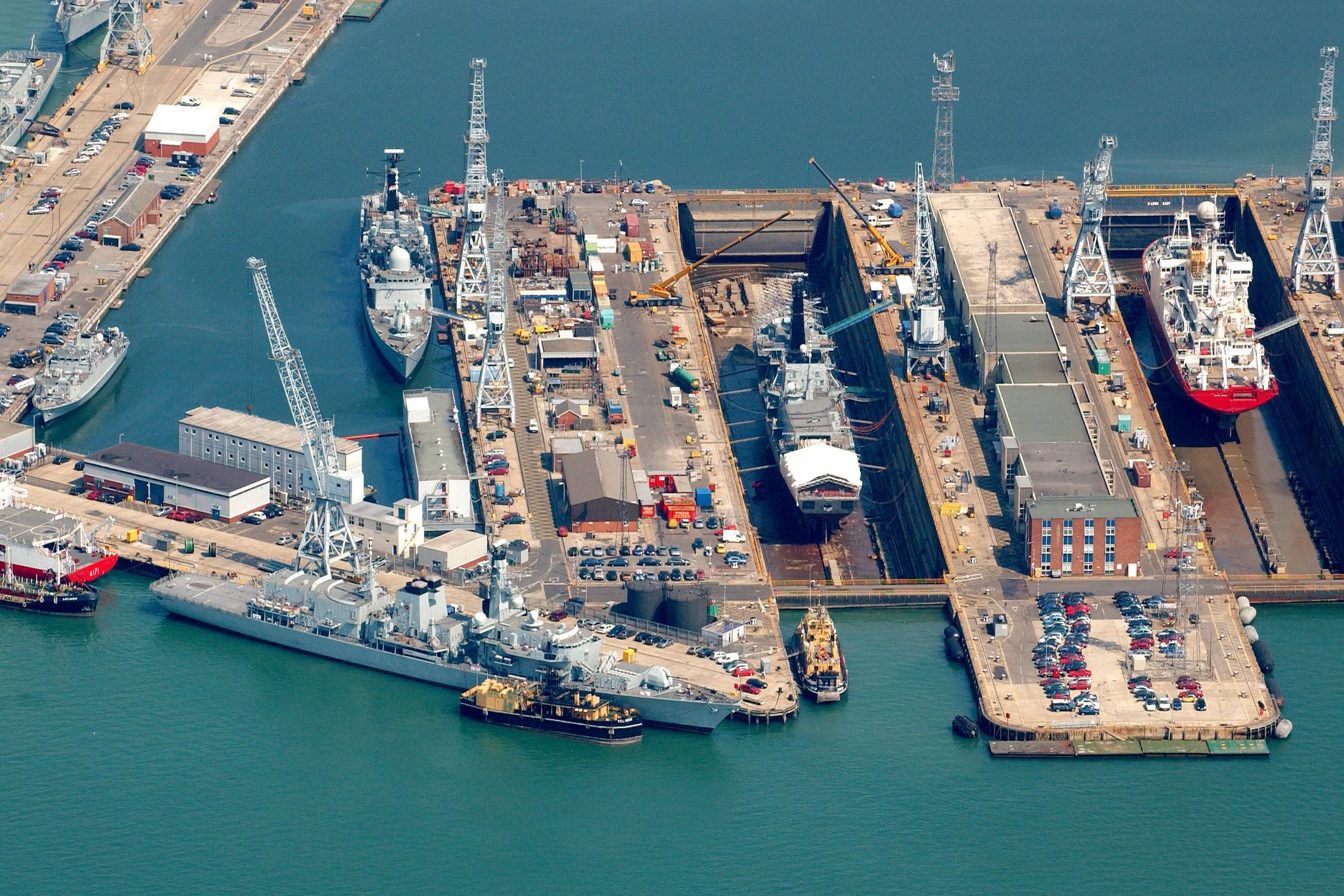
Portsmouth Dockyard

AWE Chief Inspector Charlie Franks - speaking at the Senior Leader's Conference - described Project Servator as 'Effects-Based Policing' and said it was being adopted as MDP's Operational Policing Model. The model appears to be working with the Ministry of Defence Police reporting a positive knock-on effect in reducing criminality in the wider community outside the wire at Aldermaston. Additionally, the model has been adopted at HMNB Portsmouth where officers work closely with the local community to gain information and explain the purpose of Servator deployments. In 2017, the model was adopted within the Clyde group (Faslane and Coulport) in Scotland. Officers involved in Servator deployments have set up patrols, for limited periods, within the naval base. They have done so at the various points of entry to the establishment being guarded. They have also pushed out into the wider community including railway stations, ferry ports and shopping centres. The purpose of these deployments is to make the environment perpetually hostile to would-be criminals and keep the community safe.

Sir Ben Ainslie joined a Project Servator deployment at the naval base and said "Nice to bump into these two coppers doing a great job keeping Britain safe." #Projectservator@HMNBPortsmouth

== Police forces working together ==
In 2017 officers from the City of London Police carried out examinations of vehicles and passengers at a check point on the northern side of the bridge where eight people were killed and 48 injured in the London Bridge attack on 3 June 2017. This operation was part of Project Servator which had been stepped up in response to the spate of terror attacks since the Westminster Bridge attack in March. The operation concentrated on offering a hostile surveillance and security presence on bridges over the River Thames in the capital, due to the risk of repeat attacks, while the terror threat across the country was severe. A week earlier, the City of London Police and Ministry of Defence Police carried out a similar check point operation at Tower Bridge, when a suspected illegal immigrant was arrested. In a similar fashion North Yorkshire Police has undertaken joint deployments with the York Minster Police and the Royal Military Police. The Ministry of Defence Police officers were joined by colleagues from Hampshire Police at Her Majesty's Naval Base Portsmouth.
