= Admiralty Constabulary =

Police force in the United Kingdom (1949–1971)

Department overview
- Formed: 1949
- Dissolved: 1971
- Superseding Department: Ministry of Defence Police
- Jurisdiction: Government of the United Kingdom
- Headquarters: Admiralty Building Whitehall London
- Department executive: Chief Constable, Admiralty Constabulary
- Parent Department: Admiralty; Navy Department (Ministry of Defence)

The Admiralty Constabulary was a police force in the United Kingdom formed under the Special Constables Act 1923. It was formed on 1 October 1949 by merging the Royal Marine Police and the Royal Marine Police Special Reserve (both policing dockyards since 1923) and the Admiralty Civil Police (previously policing naval hospitals). That Admiralty Constabulary was in turn amalgamated with the Army Department Constabulary and the Air Force Department Constabulary in 1971 to form the Ministry of Defence Police.

== Precursors ==
The constabulary can trace its history back to 1686 when the Royal Navy needed an organisation to prevent dockyard crime. So the Secretary to the Admiralty – Samuel Pepys, the diarist – formed a force of 'porters, rounders, warders and watchmen' to guard the naval yards. Porters identified and escorted visitors, rounders patrolled the yard, warders were responsible for the keys and backed up the porters at the gates, and the part-time watchmen guarded buildings and areas by night.

In 1834 this force became the first dockyard police, with full police powers within the dockyards, and acting as policemen over offences committed by employees and naval personnel within a radius of five miles of the yard. Rewards for obtaining convictions quickly led to corruption, so the force was 'cleaned up' and then abolished. In 1860 dockyard divisions of the Metropolitan Police took over and senior naval officers became magistrates. From 1923 onwards the Metropolitan Police presence began to be replaced by Royal Marines appointed as special constables under the Special Constables Act 1923. No. 3 (Devonport) Division was the last of these six divisions to be pulled out, leaving in 1934, the year which also saw the formal formation of the Royal Marine Police.

== See also ==
- Law enforcement in the United Kingdom
- List of defunct law enforcement agencies in the United Kingdom
- Department of Defense Police

== Sources ==
- Button, Mark (2012). Private Policing. Oxford, England: Routledge. ISBN 9781135997557.
- Focus on the Ministry of Defence Police (MDP), QuestOnline
- Hind, Bob (24 April 2016). "In days when the Admiralty ran its own police force". The News.
- Ministry of Defence Police Bill [Lords] (Hansard, 27 January 1987)". hansard.millbanksystems.com. Hansard, vol 109 cc276-85. Retrieved 13 March 2018.
