= Admiralty Powers, &c. Act 1865 =

Act of the Parliament of the United Kingdom

Admiralty Powers, &c. Act 1865 (Note: Section 12)
- Act of Parliament
- Parliament of the United Kingdom
- Long title: An Act for consolidating certain Enactments relating to the Admiralty.
- Citation: 28 & 29 Vict. c. 124
- Territorial extent: United Kingdom

Dates
- Royal assent: 6 July 1865
- Commencement: 1 January 1866 (Note: Section 10.)
- Repealed: 21 May 1981
Other legislation
Amended by	Crown Proceedings Act 1947; Theft Act 1968; Justices of the Peace Act 1968
Repealed by	Statute Law (Repeals) Act 1981
Relates to	Forgery Act 1861; Admiralty Lands and Works Act 1864

Status: Repealed

Text of statute as originally enacted

The Admiralty Powers, &c. Act 1865 (28 & 29 Vict. c. 124) was an act of the Parliament of the United Kingdom passed in 1865. It gained royal assent on 6 July 1865.

== Provisions ==
It made the admiral-superintendent of every dockyard a justice of the peace regardless of location with respect to specific offences, and of all matters relating to Her Majesty's Naval Service and her supply.

This gave them the authority to hear cases brought before him by the dockyard police (which were then the dockyard divisions of the Metropolitan Police). The rest of the act dealt with punishments for forgery and impersonation of naval seamen (sections 6 to 9) and clarified issues over the Board of Admiralty's involvement in legal actions (sections 1–4). The final sections set up a reporting system for Orders in Council relating to the act (section 11), set 1 January 1866 as the latest date for the act to come into effect (Section 10) and specified the act's short title (section 12).

== Repeal ==
Section 2 of the act was repealed by the Crown Proceedings Act 1947 (10 & 11 Geo. 6. c. 44) and the 1865 act's sections 6 to 9 (as well as the phrase "of all the offences specified in this Act, and" in its Section 5) were repealed by the Theft Act 1968

Section 5 of the act was repealed for England and Wales by section 8(2) of, and part II of schedule 5 to, the Justices of the Peace Act 1968, which came into force on 1 February 1969.

The whole act was repealed by section 1(1) of, and part I of schedule 1 to, the Statute Law (Repeals) Act 1981, which came into force on 21 May 1981.

== Sources ==
- Eyre, George; Strahan, Andrew (1865). The Statutes of the United Kingdom of Great Britain and Ireland. Vol. 28.
