= Special Constables Act 1923 =

Act of the Parliament of the United Kingdom

Special Constables Act 1923 (Note: Section 5.)
- Act of Parliament
- Parliament of the United Kingdom
- Long title: An Act to make perpetual, subject to an amendment, the Special Constables Act, 1914; to provide for the employment of special constables in connection with Naval, Military and Air Force yards and stations; and to remove certain limitations on the appointment of special constables in Scotland.
- Citation: 13 & 14 Geo. 5. c. 11
- Territorial extent: England and Wales; Scotland; Northern Ireland (except section 1); (Note: Section 1.)

Dates
- Royal assent: 7 June 1923
- Commencement: 7 June 1923 (Note: The Acts of Parliament (Commencement) Act 1793.)
Other legislation
Amends	Burgh Police (Scotland) Act 1892; Special Constables Act 1914; War Emergency Laws (Continuance) Act 1920
Amended by	Police (Scotland) Act 1956; Police Act 1964; Defence (Transfer of Functions) (No. 1) Order 1964; Ministry of Defence Police Act 1987; Anti-terrorism, Crime and Security Act 2001

Status: Partially repealed

Text of statute as originally enacted

Revised text of statute as amended

Text of the Special Constables Act 1923 as in force today (including any amendments) within the United Kingdom, from legislation.gov.uk.

The Special Constables Act 1923 (13 & 14 Geo. 5. c. 11) is an act of the Parliament of the United Kingdom passed in 1923. It made permanent the Special Constables Act 1914 (4 & 5 Geo. 5. c. 61). Words and sections from the act were repealed by the Police (Scotland) Act 1956 (4 & 5 Eliz. 2. c. 26) and the Police Act 1964 and – though it has not been repealed in its entirety – none of its sections are now in effect.

== Provisions ==
Section 1 of the act effectively repealed the phrase "during the present war" from the Special Constables Act 1914 (4 & 5 Geo. 5. c. 61) and the reference to that act in the First Schedule to the War Emergency Laws (Continuance) Act, 1920, though in both respects it exempted Northern Ireland. Its section 2 set up a procedure whereby any Orders in Council made under the 1914 act as modified by the 1923 act would be put before "both Houses of Parliament as soon as may be after it is made". A member of either House then had 21 sitting days after that date to lay an address before the Crown for the repeal of any regulations made by that Order in Council. Such regulations would be made void "without prejudice to the validity of any proceedings which may in the meantime have been taken thereunder or to the making of any new regulations provided that Orders in Council under the said Act shall not be deemed to be statutory rules within the meaning of section one of the Rules Publication Act, 1893."

Section 3 of the act replaced Metropolitan Police policing of dockyards and military bases with special constables, to be nominated by the Admiralty, Army Council or Air Council and confirmed by two justices of the peace (England and Wales), magistrates of a burgh (Scotland) or standing joint committee of a county (Scotland), with all the same powers Metropolitan Police constables had had in those places under the Metropolitan Police Act 1860 (23 & 24 Vict. c. 135) or the Metropolitan Police (Employment in Scotland) Act, 1914 (4 & 5 Geo. 5. c. 44). Such special constables remained under the control of the department which had nominated them, which also had power to suspend or terminate their appointment as a special constable. This led to the establishment of the Royal Marine Police, the Army Department Constabulary and the Air Ministry Constabulary over the course of the 1920s - these were later all subsumed into the Ministry of Defence Police.

Section 4 of the act applied section 96 of the Burgh Police (Scotland) Act 1892 (55 & 56 Vict. c. 55) and its extension by the Special Constables (Scotland) Act 1914 (4 & 5 Geo. 5. c. 53) to the 1923 act, but set the age as between 20 and 50 rather than those two acts' 26 and over.

Section 5 of the act set its short title as "Special Constables Act, 1923, and the Special Constables Act, 1914".

== Subsequent developments ==
Sections 1, 2 and 4 and the words from "and sections ninety-six" to the end of section 5 of the act were repealed for Scotland by section 38(1) of, and the third schedule to, the Police (Scotland) Act 1956 (4 & 5 Eliz. 2. c. 26), which came into force on 1 January 1957.
