= Air Force Department Constabulary =

Police force in the United Kingdom (1923-1971)

Department overview
- Formed: 1923 (as the Air Ministry Constabulary)
- Dissolved: 1971
- Superseding Department: Ministry of Defence Police
- Jurisdiction: Government of the United Kingdom
- Headquarters: Whitehall Gardens Building
- Department executive: Chief Constable, Air Force Department Constabulary
- Parent Department: Air Ministry

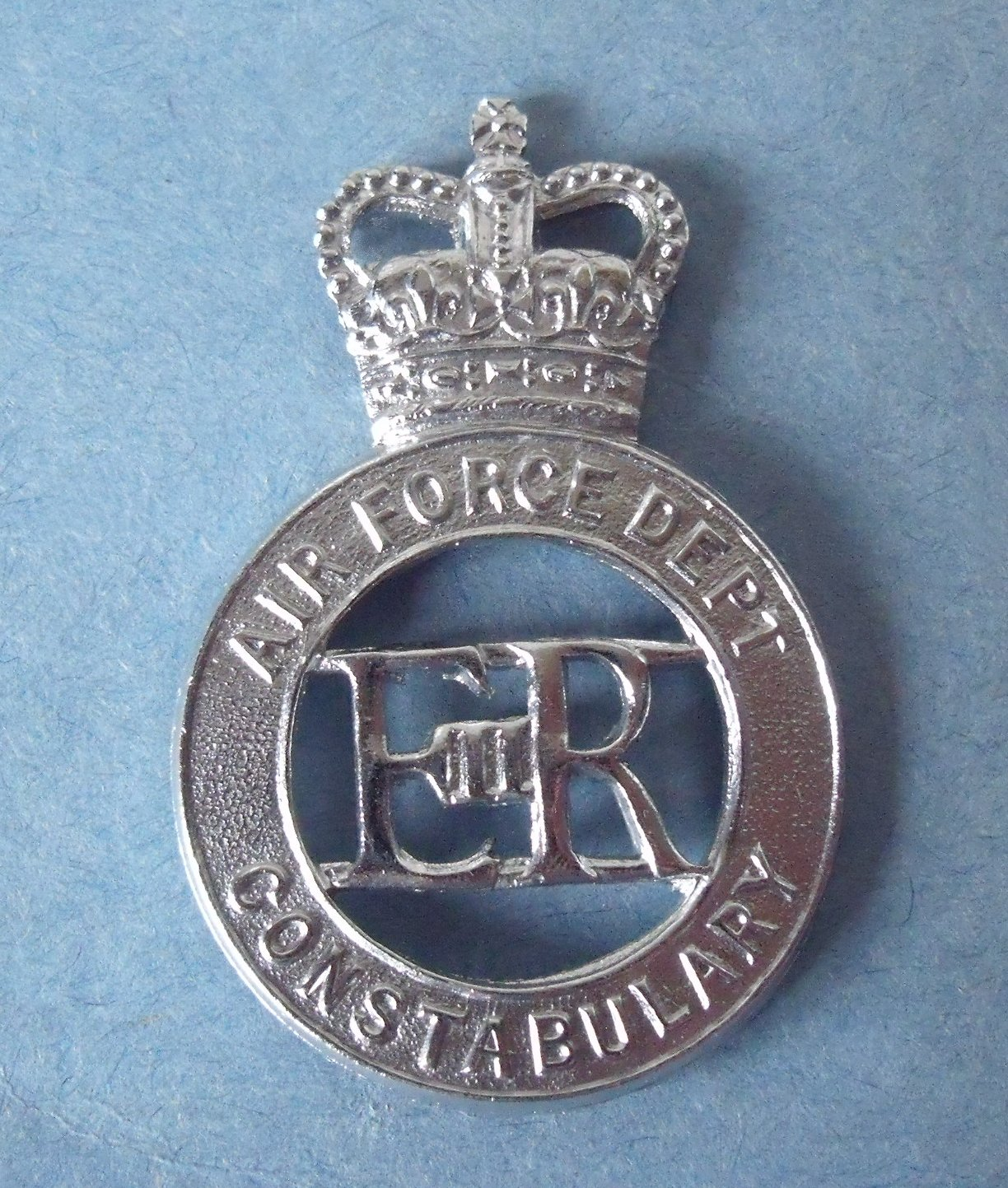
Cap badge of the Air Force Department Constabulary

The Air Force Department Constabulary (formerly the Air Ministry Constabulary) was a police force in the United Kingdom, responsible for policing the airfields and aerodromes under the control of the Air Ministry, later the Air Force Department.

Policing at Air Ministry establishments was originally provided by the Metropolitan Police and local county constabularies. For a while, as an economy measure, some establishments were staffed by warders who had no police powers but the Home Office forces remained at stores depots, where warders were considered to be inadequate, until about 1925. The passing of the Special Constables Act 1923 enabled these warders to be sworn as special constables under section 3 of the Act, and the regular police were then gradually withdrawn and replaced by warders or, as they were later styled, Air Ministry Constables.

Originally the warders and later constabulary departments were under direct control of the commanding officer of the unit at which they served. In 1942 a superintendent was appointed to RAF Maintenance Command, which was the main user of the constabulary, to advise on police matters. Later in the same year, the superintendent was moved to the Air Ministry and the beginnings were made to centralise control.

During World War II, the constabulary increased to a peak strength of 3,530 men. In 1946, F. J. May OBE was appointed as the first Chief Constable, and Squadron Leader D. F. Grierson MBE was appointed as Deputy Chief Constable.

In 1948, responsibility for civilian airports was transferred to the Ministry of Civil Aviation, and a new police force, the Ministry of Civil Aviation Constabulary was formed, leaving the Air Ministry Constabulary with responsibility for military airfields only. Reductions in the RAF, the relinquishing of control over civil airports and the introduction of more economical methods of policing saw the size of the force decrease to some 1155 men.

In 1964 the force was renamed the Air Force Department Constabulary. The Ministry of Defence Police absorbed the AFDC in 1971, along with the Army Department Constabulary and the Admiralty Constabulary.

== See also ==
- Airport policing in the United Kingdom
- Law enforcement in the United Kingdom
- List of law enforcement agencies in the United Kingdom, Crown Dependencies and British Overseas Territories
