= Army Department Constabulary =

Police force in the United Kingdom (1925-1971)

Department overview
- Formed: 1925 (as the War Department Constabulary)
- Dissolved: 1971
- Superseding Department: Ministry of Defence Police
- Jurisdiction: Government of the United Kingdom
- Headquarters: Old War Office Building
- Department executive: Chief Constable, Army Department Constabulary
- Parent Department: War Office

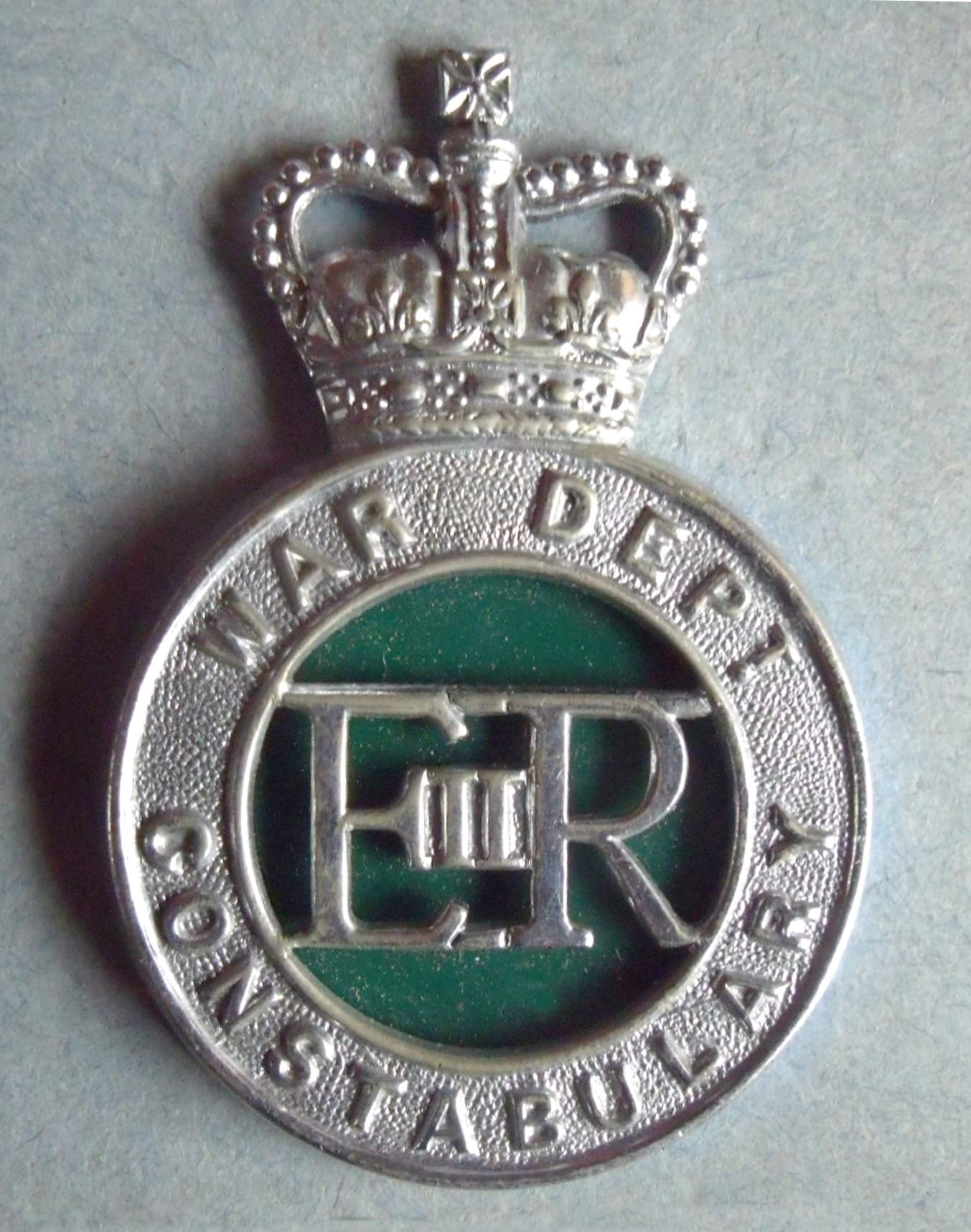
Cap badge of War Department Constabulary

The Army Department Constabulary was a security police force in the United Kingdom formed as a result of the Special Constables Act 1923. Originally, the Army used serving soldiers to guard its establishments and the only call for police was at places like the Royal Arsenal at Woolwich. A War Department Constabulary was formed in 1925 to replace the Metropolitan Police at the Arsenal, with Chief Constables including John Seymour Mellor.

It was renamed the Army Department Constabulary in 1964 when the War Office was replaced by the Army Department of the Ministry of Defence. In 1971 the Ministry of Defence Police absorbed the ADC along with the Air Force Department Constabulary and the Admiralty Constabulary.

== Sources ==
"Focus on the Ministry of Defence Police (MDP)". Archived from the original on 2007-09-28.
