= Ministry of Defence Police jurisdiction =

MDP officers are attested as constables in one of the three jurisdictions of the United Kingdom: England & Wales, Scotland and Northern Ireland, but can exercise their powers in matters relating to the Ministry of Defence Estate throughout the United Kingdom, and additionally in the circumstances described below. MDP officers' jurisdiction relates to a subject rather than a geographic area and is set out in section 2 of the Ministry of Defence Police Act 1987, which was amended by the Anti-terrorism, Crime and Security Act 2001. MDP officers are based throughout the UK and exercise their jurisdiction over matters connected with the Defence Estate; there is no requirement for them to be on Ministry of Defence land when doing so.

== Areas they are responsible for policing ==
- Land, vehicles, vessels, aircraft, and hovercraft in the possession, under the control, or used for the purposes of:
  - the Secretary of State for Defence,
  - the Defence Council,
  - a headquarters or defence organisation (as defined in the Visiting Forces and International Headquarters (Application of Law) Order 1965), or
  - the service authorities of a visiting force,
- Land, vehicles, vessels, aircraft and hovercraft which are:
  - in the possession, under the control or used for the purposes of an ordnance company, and
  - used for the purpose of, or for purposes which include, the making or development of ordnance or otherwise for naval, military or air force purposes,
- Land, vehicles, vessels, aircraft, and hovercraft which are:
  - in the possession, under the control or used for the purposes of a dockyard contractor, and
  - used for the purpose of, or for purposes which include, providing designated services or otherwise for naval, military or air force purposes,
- Land where the Secretary of State has agreed to provide the services of the Ministry of Defence Police under an agreement notice of which has been published in the appropriate Gazette.

== In matters relating to the Ministry of Defence ==
- In relation to Crown property, international defence property, ordnance property, and dockyard property (or the purpose of securing the unimpeded passage of any such property),
- In relation to people:
  - subject to the control of the Defence Council,
  - employed under or for the purposes of the Ministry of Defence or the Defence Council, or
  - in respect of whom the service courts and service authorities of any country may exercise powers by virtue of section 2 of the Visiting Forces Act 1952
  - in connection with offences against such people, with the incitement of such people to commit offences and with offences under the Prevention of Corruption Acts 1889 to 1916 in relation to such people, and
- In relation to matters connected with anything done under a contract entered into by the Secretary of State for Defence for the purposes of his Department or the Defence Council.

== On the request of a Constable ==
If requested by a constable of:

- a territorial police force; including the Police Service of Northern Ireland (PSNI)
- the British Transport Police (BTP), or
- the Civil Nuclear Constabulary (CNC)

to assist him in the execution of his duties in relation to a particular incident, investigation or operation, an MDP constable can "take on" the powers of the requesting officer for the purposes of that incident, investigation or operation. If a constable from a territorial police force makes the request, then the powers of the MDP constable extend only to the requesting constable's police area. If a constable from the BTP or CNC makes the request, then the powers of the MDP officer are the same as those of the requesting constable.

== On the request of a Chief Constable ==
If requested by the Chief Constable of one of the forces mentioned above, an MDP constable takes on all the powers and privileges of members of the requesting force. This power is used for planned operations, such as the 2005 G8 summit at Gleneagles. This power is also used for national emergencies, such as the aftermath of the 7 July 2005 London bombings. This operation saw the MDP's largest deployment of firearms officers on a non Ministry of Defence tasking, providing mutual assistance to the Metropolitan Police.

== When urgently needed ==
An MDP constable can spontaneously take on the same powers and privileges of a constable of a territorial police force:

- in relation to people whom they suspect on reasonable grounds of having committed, being in the course of committing or being about to commit an offence, or
- if they believe on reasonable grounds that they need those powers and privileges in order to save life or to prevent or minimise personal injury.

For MDP constables to use this 'urgently needed' power, two conditions must first be met:

- that the MDP constable is in uniform or has documentary evidence (Warrant Card) that they are members of the MDP; and
- the MDP constable believes on reasonable grounds that a power of a constable which they would not have, apart from this subsection, ought to be exercised and that, if it cannot be exercised until they secure the attendance of or a request from a local constable (as above), the purpose for which they believe it ought to be exercised would be frustrated or seriously prejudiced.
