= Metropolitan Police Act 1860 =

Act of the Parliament of the United Kingdom

Metropolitan Police Act 1860 (Note: The citation of this act by this short title was authorised by section 5 of, and the second schedule to, the Statute Law Revision Act 1948. Due to the repeal of those provisions, it is now authorised by section 19(2) of the Interpretation Act 1978.)
- Act of Parliament
- Parliament of the United Kingdom
- Long title: An Act for the Employment of the Metropolitan Police Force in Her Majesty’s Yards and Military Stations.
- Citation: 23 & 24 Vict. c. 135
- Territorial extent: England and Wales (Note: Section 2.); Scotland (Note: The Metropolitan Police (Employment in Scotland) Act 1914 (4 & 5 Geo. 5. c. 44).)

Dates
- Royal assent: 28 August 1860
- Commencement: 28 August 1860 (Note: The Acts of Parliament (Commencement) Act 1793.)
Other legislation
Amended by	Metropolitan Police (Employment in Scotland) Act 1914; Representation of the People Act 1948; Police Act 1964; Defence (Transfer of Functions) (No. 1) Order 1964; Armed Forces Act 2006

Status: Partially repealed

Text of statute as originally enacted

Revised text of statute as amended

Text of the Metropolitan Police Act 1860 as in force today (including any amendments) within the United Kingdom, from legislation.gov.uk.

Metropolitan Police (Employment in Scotland) Act 1914 (Note: Section 2.)
- Act of Parliament
- Parliament of the United Kingdom
- Long title: An Act to extend the Metropolitan Police Act, 1860, to Scotland.
- Citation: 4 & 5 Geo. 5. c. 44
- Territorial extent: United Kingdom

Dates
- Royal assent: 10 August 1914
- Commencement: 10 August 1914
Other legislation
Amends	Metropolitan Police Act 1860
Amended by	Police Act 1964

Status: Amended

Text of statute as originally enacted

Revised text of statute as amended

Text of the Metropolitan Police (Employment in Scotland) Act 1914 as in force today (including any amendments) within the United Kingdom, from legislation.gov.uk.

The Metropolitan Police Act 1860 (23 & 24 Vict. c. 135) is an act of the Parliament of the United Kingdom. The act was one of the Metropolitan Police Acts, granted royal assent on 28 August 1860.

It consisted of two chapters. The first allowed the Commissioner of Police of the Metropolis to assign members of the Metropolitan Police to work in royal dockyards in England and Wales such as Portsmouth and for the Commissioner to issue additional "orders and regulations" to standard Metropolitan Police rules to cover these dockyard divisions. The second outlined the powers of constables in such divisions, which covered the land, rivers and waters in the whole of the relevant dockyard and within a radius of fifteen miles around it, with all the powers he would usually exercise within the Metropolitan Police District The act was extended to Scotland in 1914 by the Metropolitan Police (Employment in Scotland) Act 1914 (4 & 5 Geo. 5. c. 44).

== Subsequent developments ==
The Metropolitan Police were phased out of dockyards between 1922 and 1934. The whole act, except as applied by the Special Constables Act 1923 (13 & 14 Geo. 5. c. 11) was repealed by section 64(3) of, and part II of schedule 10 to, the Police Act 1964, which came into force on 1 August 1964.
