= Ministry of Defence Police and Guarding Agency =

Organisation within the United Kingdom's Ministry of Defence

The agency logo

The Ministry of Defence Police and Guarding Agency (MDPGA) was an organisation within the United Kingdom's Ministry of Defence between 2004 and 2013.

It was formed on 1 April 2004 as an executive agency by the amalgamation of the MoD Police Agency with the Ministry of Defence Guard Service, with the purpose of providing a coordinated approach to the provision of security to MoD property. It had its headquarters in Wethersfield and was headed by a Chief Executive, who also served as the Chief Constable of the MoD Police. Its executive agency status was removed on 1 April 2012 and management of the MDPGA was moved back inside the MoD. It was formally disbanded on 1 April 2013.

== Organisation ==
The organisation was divided into two main areas:

=== Ministry of Defence Police ===
The Ministry of Defence Police (MDP) supplies specialised civilian policing services to the MoD community, both military and civilian units. It also supports the Defence vision (a force for good in the world) by contributing to international policing in countries such as Kosovo, Iraq, and Afghanistan during its period as part of the MDPGA; its principal role in these regions was to help develop a model for human rights-based local policing, by training and mentoring local recruits.

=== Ministry of Defence Guard Service ===
The Ministry of Defence Guard Service (MGS) role is to provide unarmed guarding and access control services to MoD units across the UK. It guards over 200 sites including the MoD HQ in London, the nuclear submarine base at HM Naval Base Clyde, and the RAF stations at Menwith Hill and Fylingdales

== Role ==
The agency's role as defined in its Corporate Plan was: Delivering effective policing and guarding as part of the UK's Defence capability. The focus of all agency activity was to counter the following crimes and security risks faced by the MoD:

- Terrorist attack and the threat of attack.
- Disruption and disorder caused by protestors.
- Theft of key assets.
- Major financial fraud.
- Unauthorised intrusion onto the Defence Estate.

== Outputs ==
- Protection of the UK's Strategic Nuclear Deterrent.
- Defence business continuity: the ability to reinforce the protection of Defence personnel and property.
- Defensive armed policing: the capability to deter and respond to, an armed attack on Defence personnel and property.
- Uniformed policing: the effective use of police powers to deter, detect, and respond to crime and disorder.
- Guarding: the provision of unarmed guarding and access control to Defence personnel and property.
- Crime investigation: the prevention, detection and investigation of crime that impacts significantly against Defence capability, and the recovery of stolen assets.
- International capability: the contribution of specialist policing expertise in support of wider Defence and foreign policy objectives.
- Policy: contributing to Defence policing and guarding policy.

== Disbandment ==
The MDPGA was formally disbanded on 1 April 2013. The MOD Police returned to standalone police force status. The management of the MOD Guard Service was taken over by the newly formed Defence Infrastructure Organisation.
