= Paul Baines (academic) =

British marketing academic (born 1973)

- Born: May 9, 1973 (age 53)
- Occupation: Academic

Academic work
- Institutions: Middlesex University; Cranfield University; University of Leicester
- Main interests: Political marketing, propaganda, market research, lobbying
- Notable works: The SAGE Handbook of Propaganda (2020); Marketing (2008)

Paul Baines (born 9 May 1973) is a British marketing academic, specialising in the topic of marketing for political parties and candidates. He is the professor in Political Marketing at Cranfield University.

== Career ==
Baines was Director of Business Development at the Middlesex University Business School and the former the Director for the Baines Associates Limited, since 2008. In 2019 he joined the University of Leicester as Professor of Political Marketing and Associate Dean.

== Research ==
Baines' research has particularly focused on the application of market research and strategic marketing by political and corporate organisations in a political context. This includes marketing for political parties, government and special interest groups, war PR and propaganda, and lobbying, with market positioning, segmentation and persuasion as the key underlying dimensions.

== Publications ==
=== Books ===
- co-editor, with Nicholas O'Shaughnessy and Nancy Snow (academic) of The SAGE Handbook of Propaganda, 2020. ISBN 9781526459985
- co-editor, with Bal Chansarkar of Introduction to Marketing Research (MU Press, 1999),
- co-author, with Ross Brennan and Paul Garneauof Contemporary Strategic Marketing(Palgrave Macmillan, 2002), 2nd ed. 2007. ISBN 978-0-230-50720-3
- co-author with Bal Chansarkar, of Introducing Marketing Research (John Wiley & Sons, 2002.),
- co-author, with John Egan and Frank Jefkins of Public Relations (Butterworth-Heinemann, 2004)
- co-author, with Sir Robert Worcester and Roger Mortimore of Explaining Labour’s Landslip (Politicos, 2005).
- co-author, with Chris Fill and Kelly Page of Marketing, Oxford University Press, 2008. ISBN 978-0-19-929043-7
