= Ministry of Defence Police Act 1987 =

Act of the Parliament of the United Kingdom

Ministry of Defence Police Act 1987 (Note: Section 8(1).)
- Act of Parliament
- Parliament of the United Kingdom
- Long title: An Act to make fresh provision for the Ministry of Defence Police.
- Citation: 1987 c. 4
- Territorial extent: United Kingdom (Note: Section 8(3).)

Dates
- Royal assent: 5 March 1987
- Commencement: 5 May 1987 (Note: Section 8(2).)

Other legislation
- Amends: Nuclear Installations Act 1965
- Amended by: Anti-terrorism, Crime and Security Act 2001; Policing and Crime Act 2017

Status: Amended

Text of statute as originally enacted

Revised text of statute as amended

Text of the Ministry of Defence Police Act 1987 as in force today (including any amendments) within the United Kingdom, from legislation.gov.uk.

The Ministry of Defence Police Act 1987 (c. 4) is an act of the Parliament of the United Kingdom which came into full force on 5 May 1987.

== Purpose ==
The act continued the existence of the Ministry of Defence Police which had been created under previous laws (in particular the Special Constables Act 1923).

== Extent ==
The act applies throughout the United Kingdom with variations included to match the requirements of the three jurisdictions of England and Wales, Scotland and Northern Ireland.

== See also ==
- Ministry of Defence Police
