= Ministry of Defence Police =

Civilian police force of the United Kingdom's Ministry of Defence

- Badge of the MDP

- Flag of the MDP
- Abbreviation: MDP

Agency overview
- Formed: 1971; 55 years ago
- Preceding agency: Army Department Constabulary, Admiralty Constabulary, Air Force Department Constabulary
- Annual budget: £180 million

Jurisdictional structure
- Operations jurisdiction: United Kingdom
- Constituting instrument: Ministry of Defence Police Act 1987
- General nature: Civilian police

Operational structure
- Overseen by: Ministry of Defence Police Committee
- Headquarters: RAF Wyton, Cambridgeshire, England
- Constables: 2,407
- Minister responsible: Vernon Coaker, Minister of State for Defence
- Agency executives: Kier Pritchard, Chief Constable; Simon Dobinson, Deputy Chief Constable
- Divisions: 2

Facilities
- Stations: 21

Website
- www.mod.police.uk

The Ministry of Defence Police (MDP) is a civilian special police force which is part of the United Kingdom's Ministry of Defence. The MDP are tasked with protecting the UK’s Defence Community, capabilities and assets. With armed officers, specialist teams and civil servants working across the UK to defend nuclear facilities, military sites, defence manufacturers and government buildings which underpin national security.

The force, which consists of two divisions, is headquartered at RAF Wyton, Cambridgeshire. It was formed in 1971 by the merger of three separate service constabularies: the Air Force Department Constabulary, the Army Department Constabulary, and the Admiralty Constabulary.

The MDP underwent a significant restructuring as part of the coalition government's post-2010 austerity measures, and the Strategic Defence and Security Review. For the spending year of 2024 to 2025 the MDP had a budget of £182.7 million. As of 2025 the force stated that it “seeks to optimise resources in alignment with evolving policing demands by leveraging technology and enhancements in broader policing to ensure cost efficiency.”

As of March 2019, the force had a workforce of around 2,549 police officers and 227 police staff based at numerous defence and infrastructure locations across the United Kingdom. The MDP has the second highest number of officers trained as authorised firearms officers of any police force, after the Metropolitan Police Service, who as of March 2019, had 2,623 AFOs.

In 2016, MDP officers made 61 arrests. Comparatively, in the year ending March 2017, a territorial police force with similar numbers of officers, Sussex Police, made 17,506 arrests.

== History ==
The Ministry of Defence Police was formed in 1971 by the merger of three civil constabularies, the Air Force Department Constabulary (previously under the control of the Air Ministry), the Army Department Constabulary (previously under the control of the War Office), and the Admiralty Constabulary (previously under the control of the Admiralty).

These earlier constabularies were formed as a result of the Special Constables Act 1923, although their histories can be traced back much further as watchmen. Their powers came from different legislative sources. In 1984, the House of Commons Defence Select Committee recognised the difficulties under which the Ministry of Defence Police were operating; the committee's recommendations led to the passing of the Ministry of Defence Police Act 1987.

During the period 2004–2013 the MDP was part of the wider Ministry of Defence Police and Guarding Agency (MDPGA) together with the civilian uniformed Ministry of Defence Guard Service (MGS). As a result of cuts made to the UK defence budget, arising from the Strategic Defence and Security Review of 2010, the MDPGA was disbanded on 1 April 2013. The MDP returned to standalone police force status. The MGS was cut heavily and became part of the new Defence Infrastructure Organisation.

== Functions ==
The MDP states that its function is to protect Defence assets, prevent and investigate Defence related crime, conduct maritime security operations, support national security operation and support US Visiting Forces.

=== Deployment and locations ===
The MDP is deployed at approximately 21 defence locations around the United Kingdom. These include—but are no longer limited to—military establishments, defence housing estates, military training areas, the royal dockyards, and the Atomic Weapons Establishment.

Since January 2008, the MDP has also taken on the role of providing armed security at four gas terminals in the UK, part of the critical national infrastructure. As of 2024 responsibility for these sites had been transferred to the Civil Nuclear Constabulary.

In February 2015, the MDP deployed officers to GCHQ Cheltenham on a full-time basis; this was in response to the 2014 increase to the UK threat level from international terrorism.

== Jurisdiction ==
MDP officers are attested as constables in one of the three jurisdictions of the United Kingdom: England & Wales, Scotland and Northern Ireland, but can exercise their powers in matters relating to the Ministry of Defence Estate throughout the United Kingdom, and additionally in the circumstances described below. MDP officers' natural geographic jurisdiction relates to MOD property and land as set out in section 2 of the Ministry of Defence Police Act 1987, which was amended by the Anti-terrorism, Crime and Security Act 2001. MDP officers also have police jurisdiction in relation to certain persons connected with the MOD, crime related to the MOD and the escorting of the movement of MOD property anywhere in the United Kingdom.

MDP officers are able to take on the powers of constables of territorial police forces, or other special police forces, such as British Transport Police, in certain situations. This is known as 'extended jurisdiction' and use of these powers is set out in the Ministry of Defence Police Act (as amended). Protocols are in place which govern the relationships between the MOD Police and local forces under these circumstances.

=== Policing protocols with other forces ===
Local agreements with territorial police forces are made under the overarching general protocols agreed between the MDP chief constable and other chief constables. These set out the agreed working relationship between the MDP and other police forces; outlining, where necessary, areas of responsibility and accountability. The protocols make provision for consultation and co-operation between the forces, with the aim of delivering the best policing on the ground.

== Oversight ==
Unlike the other special police forces in the United Kingdom, the MDP does not have a police authority to oversee the functions of the force; however, the Ministry of Defence Police Committee, established by the Ministry of Defence Police Act 1987, advises the Secretary of State for Defence on matters concerning the MDP. The committee (or its members) also has various functions in determining police misconduct and appeals cases.

According to the terms of reference of the MOD Police Committee, the committee is responsible for:

- providing scrutiny and guidance to ensure that police powers and authority are impartially and lawfully exercised by the chief constable
- confirming that the MDP is meeting the standards required of a police force
- confirming that the MDP's exercise of its authority is responsible, proportionate and impartial
- confirming that MoD's use of the MDP is appropriate in relation to the exercising of policing powers and authority
- providing scrutiny and guidance on matters of efficiency and effectiveness and on any other matter in relation to the use of policing powers which fall within the responsibility of the MDP
- considering the MDP's targets, financial performance and risk management arrangements
- providing advice once a year to the top-line budget holder covering financial performance and risk management for inclusion in the Annual Assurance Report
- assisting in the appointment of chief officers to the MDP
- considering all complaints made against MDP chief officers (this responsibility may be delegated to a sub-panel of the committee)
- undertaking all responsibilities required of the MDP Conduct and Appeal Regulations
- submitting an annual report to the Defence Secretary on the MDP's discharge of policing powers, and providing advice to ministers and the department, on matters concerning value for money and efficiencies
- publishing the operating costs and expenses of the committee each year

== Command structure ==
The MDP has two land-based functional divisions (reduced from five geographic divisions as part of SDSR in April 2012):

- Nuclear Division
- Territorial Division

== Rank insignia ==
Ministry of Defence Police (MDP) Ranks
Rank	Chief constable (CC)	Deputy chief constable (DCC)	Assistant chief constable (ACC)	Chief superintendent	Superintendent	Chief inspector	Inspector	Sergeant	Constable
Epaulette insignia									

== Personnel ==
As of May 2024, the force strength was around 2,407 officers.

=== Entry requirements ===
Entry requirements for new officers are similar to UK territorial police forces; however, because all MDP officers can carry firearms, the eyesight focal acuity standard and basic fitness standard is higher. Entrants must also be British nationals. The MDP recruits nationally and new entrants may be given a posting anywhere in the UK. In practice, most new entrants are initially posted to nuclear division; either at one of the two AWE establishments in South East England or one of the stations in Western Scotland.

=== Initial training ===
New recruits are trained at the Defence School of Policing, Security and Guarding which is based at Southwick Park, Hampshire. All officers undertake a 12-week residential course beginning their L4 Non Home Office Police Officer apprenticeship; officers who will be based in Scotland go on to complete a 2-week Scottish Law Module.

Upon completion of the residential course, officers attend a 9-week intensive firearms training course at one of the MDP's regional hubs; this qualifies them as Authorised Firearms Officer Counter-Terrorism (AFO-CT).

The remainder of their training is carried out once they arrive at their station and all new recruits are subject to a 2-year probationary period.

=== Security clearance ===
In addition to pre-entry security checks, all MDP officers are required to hold at least UK Government Security Check (SC) clearance, which clears the holders to "UK Secret" level. Officers posted to certain sites, including AWE, are required to hold Developed Vetting (DV) status, which involves an extensive background investigation and formal interviews. DV status clears the officer to "UK Top Secret" level.

Those officers working with US Forces in the UK are required to hold a US Common Access Card, for which the US Government carries out its own security checks on the officers.

=== Terms and conditions ===
As of September 2025, the starting pay for newly recruited MDP constables is £29,606 rising to £47,743 after 6 years. New recruits are entitled to 25 days' leave, which rises to 30 days after 10 years' service.

Discipline in the MDP is governed by the Ministry of Defence Police (Conduct) Regulations 2009, which broadly resemble the Police (Conduct) Regulations 2008 that govern territorial police forces. MDP officers retain a full national mobility liability, and can be posted anywhere in the UK at any time. In practice, most movement is voluntary, either on promotion or requested moves for personal reasons.

MDP pay follows the same scale as territorial police forces; however, MDP officers are part of the Civil Service Pension Scheme (ALPHA), not the Police Pension Scheme, and contribute between 4.6% & 8.05% (salary dependent) of their gross salary, compared with territorial police force officers who contribute 11%. To even out this anomaly, MDP officers' pay is abated. This is known as the MDP Net Pay Deduction.

The MDP operates a random and "with cause" alcohol and drugs screening policy.

All MDP Police Constables / Sergeants are required to complete an annual fitness test which is the Physical Employment Standard – Job Related Fitness Test designed specifically for firearms officers. MDP officers of the rank of Inspector and above are required to complete the multi-stage fitness test to level 5.4.

=== Defence Police Federation ===
The MDP has its own federation (i.e., trade union) separate from Home Office police federations. The Defence Police Federation (DPF) was created in 1971 and has legal status by provision of the Ministry of Defence Police Act 1987. The DPF functions in a similar fashion to a trade union, with membership being voluntary, except that – like all UK police forces – officers do not have the right to take strike action.

The DPF has in recent years concentrated its efforts on what it sees as unfair conditions levelled on MDP officers in comparison to other Home Office (HO) and special police forces. These include:

- Pay – MDP Officers are paid only 95% of the salary other officers receive. This includes Civil Nuclear Constabulary (CNC) Officers, who now have full pay parity with HO forces.
- Retirement age – MDP Officers are currently expected to work until age 65. This includes requalifying yearly as an AFO and completing the PES-JRFT. The DPF is currently co-operating with a study by the University of Loughborough to determine how realistic these fitness expectations are of officers as they age.

== Uniform, armament and equipment ==
=== Personal Protective Equipment ===
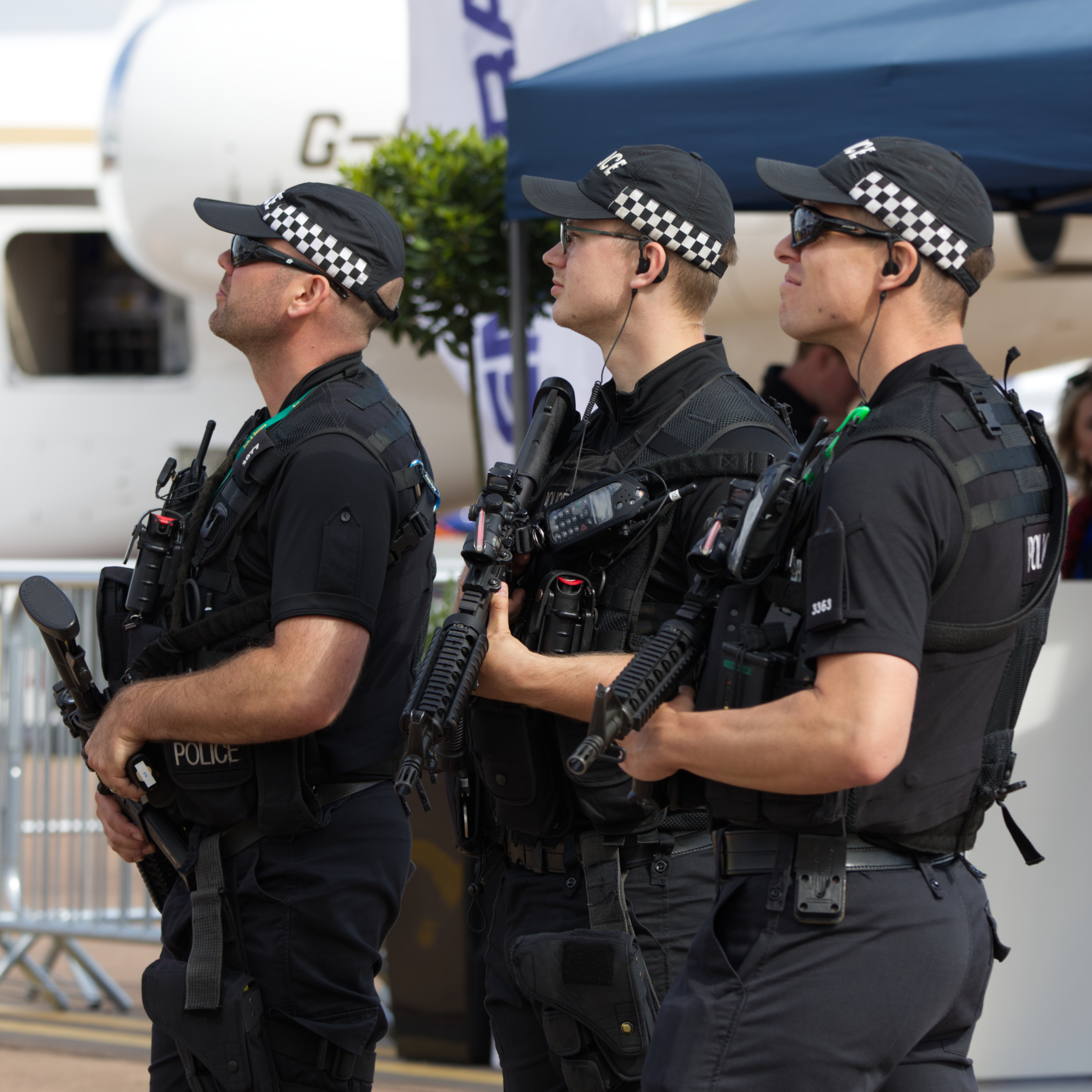
Officers in polo shirts and body armour. Weapons carried are C8 carbines.

Officers in the MDP are ordinarily equipped with personal body armour, PAVA incapacitation spray, batons, Hiatt speedcuffs and an Axon Flex Body Worn Video Camera.

Most officers are armed with the Colt C8 Carbine, Glock 9mm Self Loading Pistol and the Axon Taser X2.

== Special capabilities ==
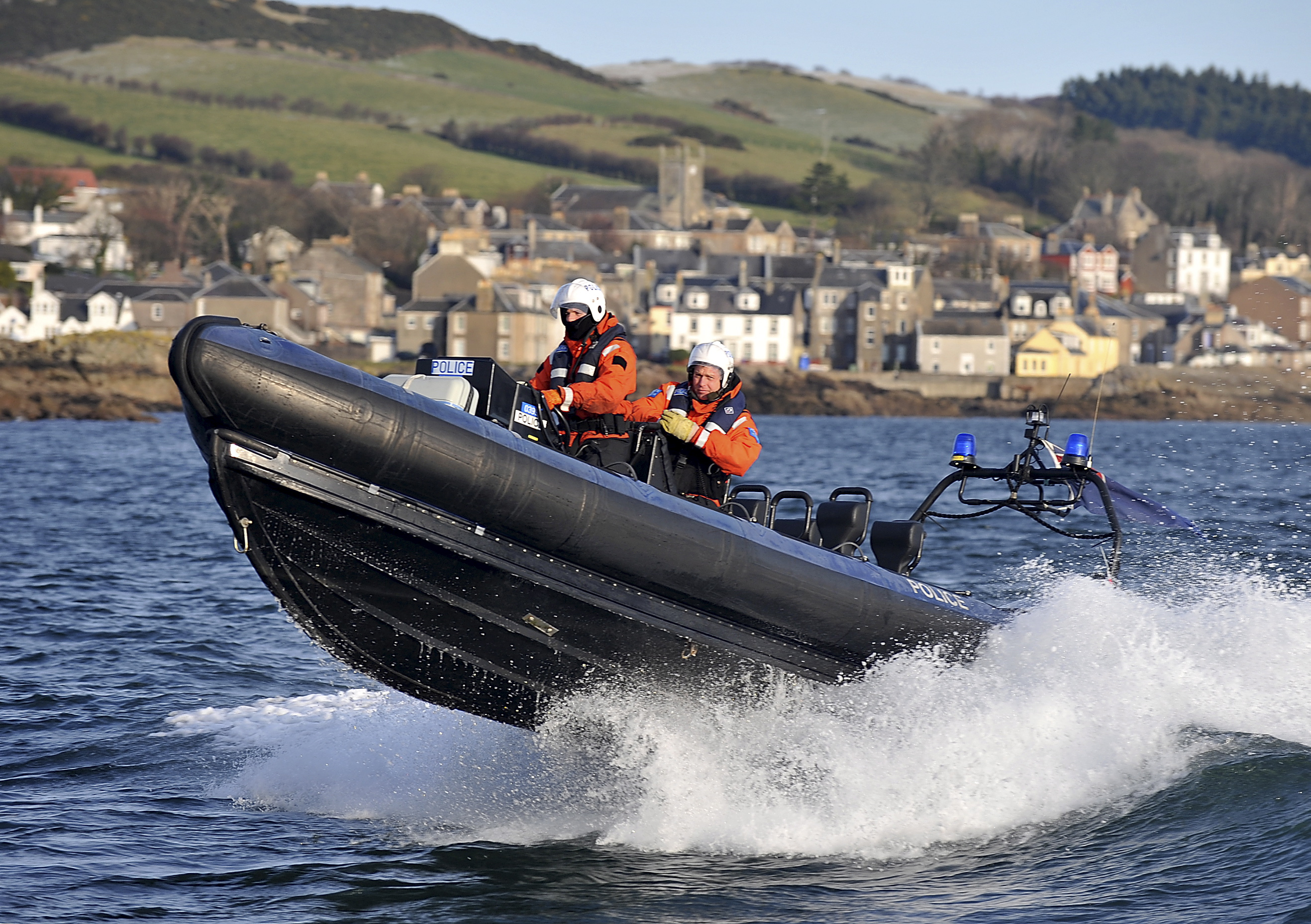
MDP RIB at Clyde

=== Marine unit ===
The MDP has a large marine fleet. The marine support units are responsible for the waterborne security of His Majesty's Dockyards and HM Naval Bases. The marine support units are based at HMNB Portsmouth, HMNB Devonport and HMNB Clyde. At HMNB Clyde, the marine unit works with the Fleet Protection Group Royal Marines.

See also Island-class patrol vessel (2013).

In 2021, the Ministry of Defence contracted with Marine Specialised Technology to build 16 new patrol boats for the Ministry of Defence Police and a further two specifically for the Gibraltar Defence Police. The new 15m boats, which are replacing the existing vessels, have a crew of three (plus room for four more passengers), a top speed of 30 knots and are fitted with both ballistic protection and CCTV surveillance systems. Delivery of the vessels was expected to begin in July 2022.

=== Chemical, biological, radiological or nuclear response ===
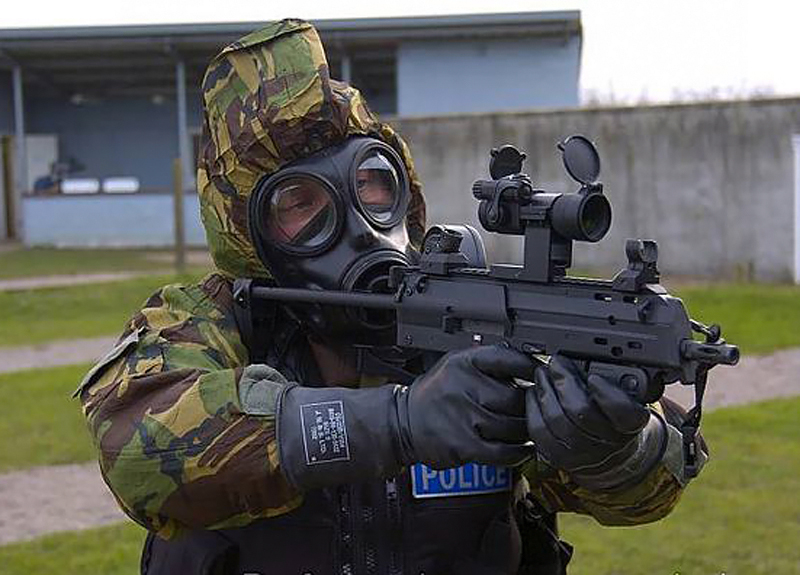
MDP officer on range—with MP7SF in CBRN Suit

Although only constituting 1.5% of the national police force, the MDP has 8% of the national chemical, biological, radiological and nuclear (CBRN) response capability. Officers deployed to Nuclear Division are trained in CBRN defence and to work in radiologically controlled environments. The force maintains a large pool of specially-trained officers nationally, known as the Nuclear Guard Force (NGF), who can be deployed at short notice in the event of a nuclear accident; they perform this function alongside the UK's national Nuclear Accident Response Organisation (NARO).

=== Dog sections ===
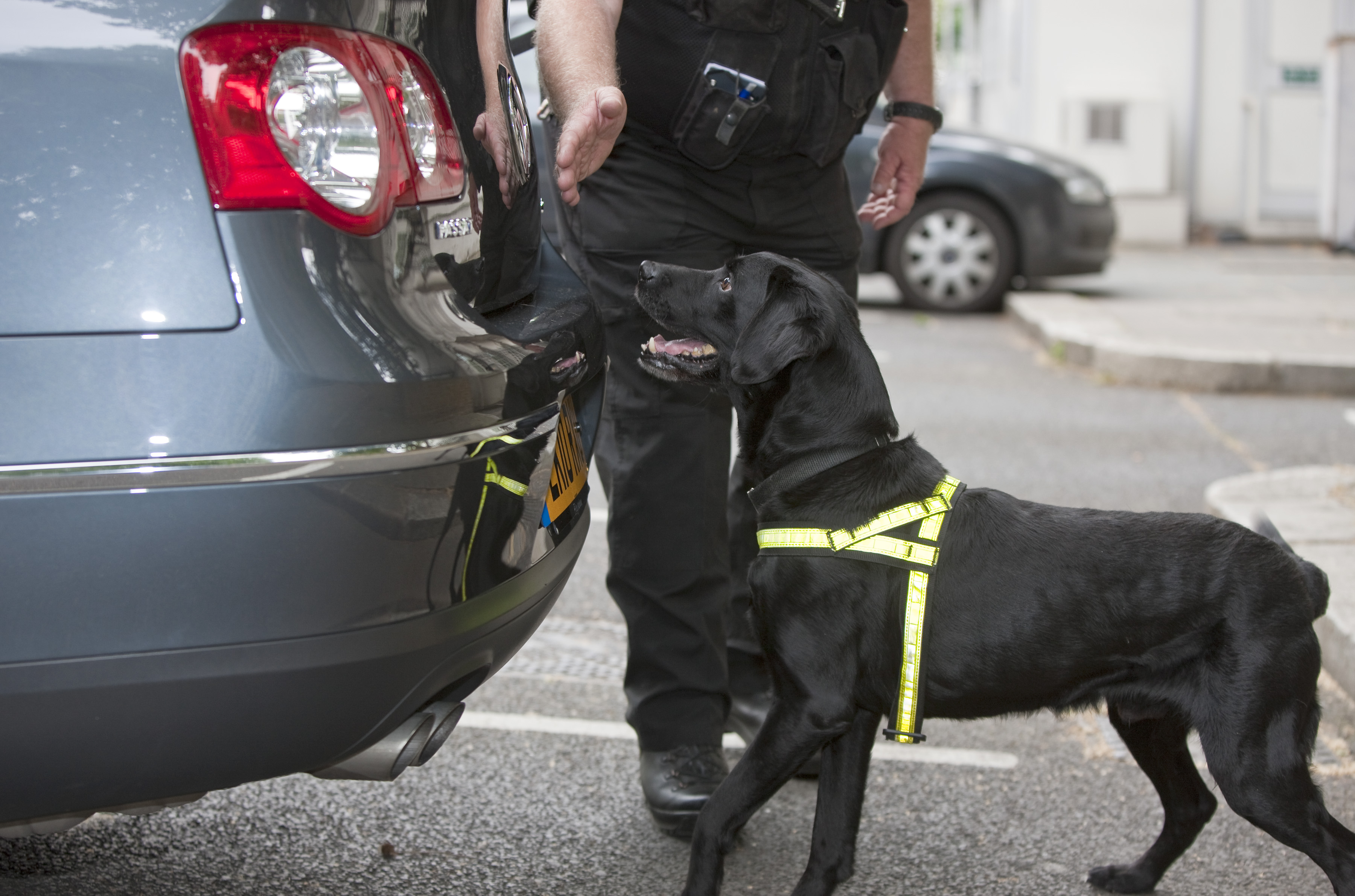
MDP explosives detection dog searching vehicles

The MDP has the second largest number of police dogs of any UK police force and utilises explosive, drug, tactical firearms support, and general purpose police dogs.

Special Escort Group (SEG)

The SEG provides critical security for sensitive Defence transportation operations moving Defence materials which are fundamental for national security across primarily the UK road network.

Intelligence, Crime & Operational Support (ICOS)

ICOS forms a central pillar of the MDP’s capability to prevent, investigate and disrupt serious and organised criminal activity targeting Defence and national security.

ICOS has a wide range of officer roles within it ranging from forward deployed Intelligence Support Officers, specialist CT Intelligence Officers, Criminal Investigation Detectives and specialist Financial Investigators supported by operational support units.

=== Central Support Groups ===
The Force has three Central Support Groups (CSGs), which provide regional support where additional resources are needed. These are located at Aldershot, Bicester and Scotland.

=== Tactical Firearms Unit ===
The Tactical Firearms Unit is a specialist group of officers within the AWE Division. MDP TFU is tasked with, and equipped to provide, an advanced firearms response capability at short notice to the Atomic Weapons Establishment. The TFU specialises in dynamic entry and dynamic intervention inside Nuclear Weapons facilities; including, if necessary, the recapture of Nuclear Weapons and special nuclear material.

=== Defence community police officers ===
DCPOs were unarmed MDP officers who provided community policing to Defence establishments or large military housing estates, in a similar manner to the Neighbourhood Policing Teams of territorial police forces. DCPOs generally worked in single-officer posts and often work from within defence community centres or service police stations. As of 2026 there are no DCPO’s remaining in the MDP.

=== Project Servator ===
The MDP has implemented Project Servator as an effects-based policing tactic since 2016 to deter and detect criminal and terrorist activity, as well as to reassure the various communities they serve.

Project Servator tactics provide a strategic approach to defending sites that the MDP protects and are part of the Force's drive to deploy resources efficiently and effectively within its Operational Policing Model.

Project Servator is utilised in and around the sites that the MDP protect across the UK, including HMNB Portsmouth, AWE Aldermaston, AWE Burghfield, HMNB Clyde, RNAD Coulport, HMNB Devonport, BAE Systems Barrow and Ministry of Defence Main Building (Whitehall). A surge capability is also available where required.

Notably the MDP are utilising new technology to support Project Servator such as a detection arch recently seen in use on their social media.

The MDP work closely with: Police Scotland, Metropolitan Police Service, City of London Police, MOD Guard Service British Transport Police, Royal Navy Police, Border Force and the Civil Nuclear Constabulary who operate Project Servator in the areas close to the communities that the MDP serves.

Counter Unmanned Aerial System (CUAS)

MDP officers can obtain authorisations to interfere with drones across the UK at Defence sites.

=== International policing ===
The MDP has been one of the largest contributors of UK police officers to overseas policing missions, with the majority deployed to Kosovo and Afghanistan.

== Notable incidents and investigations ==
- 1997: Milos Stankovic: British Army officer Major Milos Stankovic, whose father was a Serbian, was arrested and interviewed by the MDP in 1997 under the Official Secrets Act acting on information that alleged that he, while serving as a Serbo-Croat interpreter for senior British Army officers in Sarajevo, passed sensitive information to the Bosnian Serbs. During the investigations, MDP officers interviewed more than 100 witnesses in Britain and abroad. But the investigation, which cost more than £250,000, found no evidence of espionage. The case did not proceed to trial. Stankovic went to the press, and sued the MDP for £1 million compensation. In 2007, Mr Justice Saunders threw out the majority of his case and awarded just £5,000 for the MDP "seizing and removing items outside the terms of a search warrant" but making Stankovic liable for all costs (circa £500,000) "
- 1998, Tony Geraghty: British–Irish author and journalist Tony Geraghty was arrested and his house searched by MDP Special Branch, investigating offences against the Official Secrets Act involving his contact with a former Northern Ireland bomb disposal officer Lt Col Nigel Wylde. Wylde was subsequently charged with passing secrets to Geraghty, but the case collapsed during trial. It led to criticism in the media that the MDP was beyond public accountability and had the power to impede the freedom of the press.
- 2003–2004, Pitcairn Island Child Abuse investigations (Operation Unique): MDP officers were deployed to Pitcairn as part of the international investigation team into communal child sexual abuse on the island.
- 7 July 2005, Response to London suicide bombings: Operation Toga saw a significant deployment of firearms officers on a non-Ministry of Defence tasking, to assist the Metropolitan Police to counter the threat of further suicide attacks in Central London.
- 2001–2005, Deepcut Barracks suspicious deaths of four soldiers: MDP CID Involvement in investigations, which later led to a complaint to the Independent Police Complaints Commission by the deceased's families, who refused to believe police conclusions that each of the deaths by shooting of the soldiers was suicide, but an independent review by Nicholas Blake QC in 2007 absolved Surrey Police and MDP of any wrongdoing, but was highly critical of the Army. The events of the deaths are the subject of the stage play "Deep Cut" by Philip Ralph. No one was ever charged.
- 2006, Ipswich Prostitute Murders: MDP provided an OSU and 100 additional officers for searches and enquiries at the request of Suffolk Constabulary following the murder of five women by Steve Wright
- 26 January 2009, Death of Krzysztof Lubkiewicz: The IPCC investigated the MDP after the death of a Polish national immediately after contact with MDP officers. The officers themselves were later exonerated; however, the IPCC criticised the MDP's divisional control room's procedures, and their communication with other forces. This was the first investigation of the MDP by the IPCC after its jurisdiction was extended to include the MDP in 2008.
- 29 September 2010: The leak of Secretary of State for Defence Liam Fox's letter to Prime Minister David Cameron: MDP CID London and OSU South were tasked to search MoD Headquarters in Whitehall, and carry out an investigation to uncover the person(s) responsible for leaking a highly damaging letter from Defence Secretary Liam Fox to Prime Minister David Cameron, to the press. In the letter, Fox expressed grave concerns about forthcoming defence cuts. No one was ever charged.
- 8 August 2011: The 2011 England riots. Two days after the riots began, as a result of a direct tasking from the Home Office, the Chief Constable MDP deployed all available MDP public order officers to the Metropolitan Police Area to assist with restoration and the maintenance of public order in London. MDP General Police Duties officers were also sent to reinforce Essex police, to backfill for Essex officers who had been sent into London.
- 24 May 2017: Manchester Arena bombing MOD police officers were deployed to assist Kent police, Nottinghamshire police, and Leicestershire police among others as part of Operation Temperer.
- February 2026: MOD Police officers conducted an enquiry into drone sightings reported at US Airbases. To date, no one has been charged.

== See also ==
- Special Police#United Kingdom
- Military police of the United Kingdom
- Military Provost Guard Service
- Northern Ireland Security Guard Service
- Germany Guard Service
- United States Department of Defense police
