= Irish Republican Army =

Paramilitary organisations in Ireland

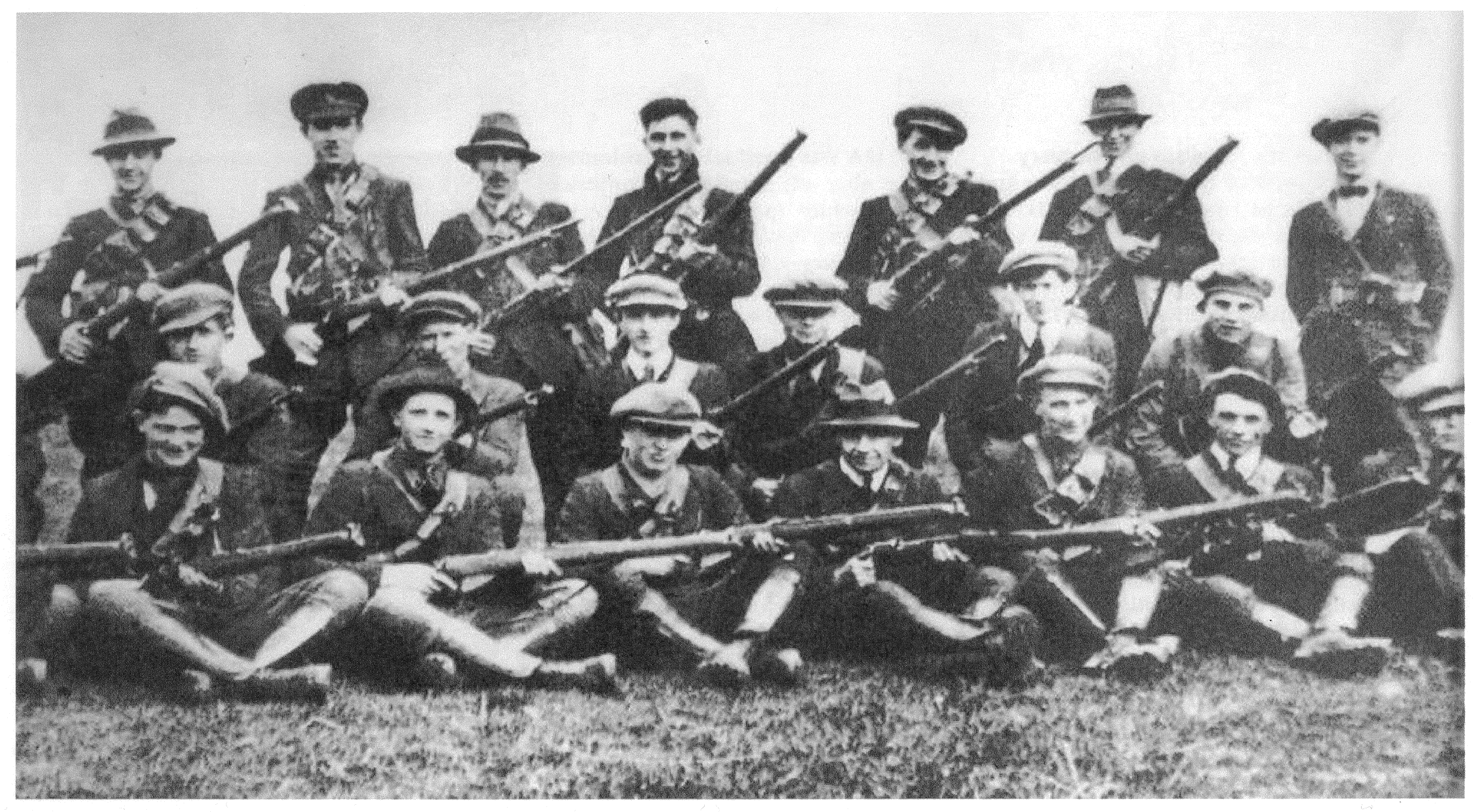
Flying Column No. 2 of the 3rd Tipperary Brigade of the Old IRA, photographed during the early 1920s. All organisations calling themselves "Irish Republican Army" claim legitimate descent (sometimes compared to apostolic succession) from this IRA of 1919–1922.

The Irish Republican Army (IRA) is a name used by various militant organisations in Ireland throughout the 20th and 21st centuries. Organisations by this name have been dominantly Catholic and dedicated to the belief that all of Ireland should be an independent republic free from British colonial rule.

The original Irish Republican Army (1919–1922), often now referred to as the "old IRA", was raised in 1919 from members of the Irish Volunteers and the Irish Citizen Army later reinforced by Irishmen formerly in the British Army in World War I, who returned to Ireland to fight against Britain in the Irish War of Independence. In Irish law, this IRA was the army of the revolutionary Irish Republic as declared by its parliament, Dáil Éireann, in 1919.

In the century that followed, the original IRA was reorganised, changed and split on multiple occasions, to such a degree that many subsequent paramilitary organisations have been known by that title – most notably the Provisional Irish Republican Army, which was a key participant during the Troubles in Northern Ireland. The contemporary IRA organisations each claim the sole right to the name, each insisting they are the original IRA's only legitimate descendant.

== Overview of the IRAs ==
The playwright and former IRA member Brendan Behan once said that the first issue on any Irish organisation's agenda was "the split". For the IRA, that has often been the case. The first split came after the Anglo-Irish Treaty in 1921, with supporters of the Treaty forming the nucleus of the National Army of the newly created Irish Free State, while the anti-treaty forces continued to use the name Irish Republican Army. After the end of the Irish Civil War (1922–23), the IRA experienced varying relevancy and success. In 1969 the IRA split into the Official IRA and the Provisional IRA. The latter then had its own breakaways, namely the Real IRA and the Continuity IRA, each claiming to be the true successor of the Army of the Irish Republic.

- The Irish Republican Army (1919–1922), known as the "Old IRA", in later years, was recognised by the First Dáil as the legitimate army of the Irish Republic in April 1921 due to the fact that it had fought in the Irish War of Independence. On ratification of the Anglo-Irish Treaty by the Dáil, it split into pro-Treaty forces, the National Army, also known as the "Government forces" or the "Regulars", and anti-Treaty forces, "Republicans", "Irregulars" or "Executive forces" after the Treaty. These two forces went on to fight the Irish Civil War.
- The Irish Republican Army (1922–1969), the anti-treaty IRA which fought and lost the civil war and thereafter refused to recognise either the Irish Free State or Northern Ireland, deeming both of them to be the creations of British imperialism. It existed in one form or another for over 40 years before it split in 1969.
- The Official IRA (OIRA), the remainder of the IRA after the 1969 split from the Provisionals, was primarily Marxist in its political orientation. It is now inactive, while its political wing, Official Sinn Féin, became the Workers' Party (Ireland).
- The Provisional IRA (PIRA) broke from the OIRA in 1969 due to abstentionism and differing views on how to deal with the increasing violence in Northern Ireland. Although it opposed the OIRA's Marxism, it came to develop a left-wing orientation and it also increased its political activity.
- The Continuity IRA (CIRA) broke from the PIRA in 1986, because the latter ended its policy on abstentionism (thus recognising the authority of the Republic of Ireland).
- The Real IRA (RIRA), a 1997 breakaway from the PIRA consisting of members opposed to the Northern Ireland peace process.
- In April 2011, former members of the Provisional IRA announced a resumption of hostilities, and that "they had now taken on the mantle of the mainstream IRA". They further claimed; "We continue to do so under the name of the Irish Republican Army. We are the IRA" and insisted that they "were entirely separate from the Real IRA, Óglaigh na hÉireann (ONH) and the Continuity IRA". They claimed responsibility for the April assassination of PSNI constable Ronan Kerr as well as responsibility for other attacks that had previously been claimed by the Real IRA and ONH.
- The New IRA, which was formed as a merger between the Real IRA and other republican groups in 2012 (see Real IRA).

== Genealogy of the IRA and its splits ==
The IRA and its splinter groups include:

- Original IRA (the "old IRA") – fought in the War of Independence 1919–1921
  - That part of the IRA that accepted the compromise of the 1921 treaty which established the Irish Free State and that became the initial Free State government. The pro-treaty faction of Sinn Féin led by Arthur Griffith, Lachlan Lawrence and Michael Collins shortly thereafter formed itself into the Cumann na nGaedheal party under W. T. Cosgrave. With additional recruits, its military supporters became the National Army, later known as the Irish Defence Forces. Cumann na nGaedheal merged with other groups in 1933 to form Fine Gael Party, currently the third largest party in the Republic of Ireland.
  - That part of the original IRA organised within Northern Ireland not included within the Free State (see below).
  - That part of the IRA, organised within the twenty-six counties that became the Free State, which rejected the compromise of the 1921 treaty with Britain. Under Liam Lynch, it fought the Irish Civil War against the Free State's National Army (led by Michael Collins), with the support of the anti-treaty faction of Sinn Féin led by Éamon de Valera.
    - Some years after losing the Civil War a faction led by de Valera resigned from Sinn Féin and established the Fianna Fáil party in 1926, which is among the largest parties in the Republic of Ireland.
    - In the 1930s, the remainder of the IRA, including that part of the Old IRA organised within Northern Ireland, attempted a bombing campaign in Britain, a campaign in Northern Ireland (after a change in leadership to the north) and some military activities in the Free State (later the Republic of Ireland). After a period of poor relations, the symbiotic relationship between Sinn Féin and the IRA was re-established in the late 1930s.
      - By the 1960s, after the failed border campaign, Sinn Féin moved towards a Marxist class struggle outlook. With the outbreak of the Troubles, Sinn Féin, or as it came to be called after the formation of the Provisional IRA and Provisional Sinn Féin, Official IRA / Official Sinn Féin, found itself sidelined because of its decision not to engage the British state militarily. Over time the Official IRA faded away, while Official Sinn Féin moved to a purely Marxist position, renaming itself first Sinn Féin the Workers Party, and then in 1982 the Workers' Party.
        - After the Official IRA's 1972 ceasefire, it and Official Sinn Féin suffered a split in 1974 leading to the formation of the far left Irish National Liberation Army (INLA) and Irish Republican Socialist Party, led by Seamus Costello (later assassinated by the Official IRA during a bloody feud). The INLA was known for a series of internal feuds and some of the more sectarian killings by Irish nationalists.
          - In 1986, the Irish People's Liberation Organisation split from the INLA.
        - In 1992, the Workers' Party suffered a split when a majority faction failed to secure changes. They left and formed the Democratic Left. Ultimately, the Democratic Left merged into the Labour Party.
      - In 1969, the more traditionalist republican members split off into the Provisional IRA and Sinn Féin. The Provisional IRA operated mostly in Northern Ireland, using violence against the Royal Ulster Constabulary and the British Army, and British institutions and economic targets. They also killed members of the Irish Army and the Garda Síochána (the Republic's police force), which was against one of their standing orders.
        - A further split occurred in 1986 when the former leader of Sinn Féin Ruairí Ó Brádaigh – who was replaced by Gerry Adams in 1983 – walked out of the Sinn Féin Ard Fheis after delegates voted to end the policy of abstentionism from Dáil Éireann. The followers of Ó Brádaigh, who adhere to republican legitimatism and oppose Sinn Féin's decision to abandon abstentionism, set up a rival party and military wing called Republican Sinn Féin and the Continuity IRA.
          - In 2006, the Irish Republican Liberation Army, Óglaigh na hÉireann and Saoirse na hÉireann split from the Continuity IRA.
        - In 1997, Members of the Provisional IRA who did not accept the peace process split off to form the Real IRA. Its political wing is the 32 County Sovereignty Movement.
          - In 2009, Óglaigh na hÉireann split from the Real IRA.
            - In 2012, the Real IRA merged with other republican groups including the Republican Action Against Drugs (RAAD) to form the New IRA.
        - In 2011, according to the Belfast Telegraph, former members of the Provisional IRA announced a resumption of hostilities under the name "Irish Republican Army".

== See also ==
- Irish republicanism
- List of designated terrorist groups

== Bibliography ==
- Bell, J. Bower, The Secret Army. New Brunswick, NJ: Transaction Publishers. 1997. ISBN 1560009012.
- Cronin, Sean, The Ideology of the IRA (Ann Arbor 1972)
- Hart, Peter, IRA at War 1916–1923 (Oxford 2003)
- Hart, P, The IRA and its Enemies: Violence and Community in Cork 1916–1923 (Oxford 1998)
- Joy, Sinead, The IRA in Kerry 1916–1921 (Cork 2005)
- Liebknecht, Karl, Militarism and Anti-Militarism (1907); an English translation (Cambridge 1973).
- Martin, F.X., (ed.) Irish Volunteers 1914–1915. Recollections and Documents (Dublin 1963)
- O'Ruairc, Padraig Og, Blood on the Banner: The Republican Struggle in Clare 1913–1923 (Cork 2009)
- Ryan, Meda, Tom Barry: IRA Freedom Fighter (Cork 2005)
- Townshend, Charles, 'The Irish Republican Army and the Development of Guerrilla Warfare 1916–21', English Historical Review 94 (1971), pp. 318–345.
- W?, With the IRA in the Fight For Freedom (London 1968)
- Nolan, Cillian, The IRA True History 1922–1969 (Kerry 1985)
- Trigg, Jonathan (2023). Death in the Fields: The IRA and East Tyrone. Ireland: Merrion Press.
