= IRLA =

IRLA may refer to:

- Irla – A neighbourhood in Mumbai
- Irish Republican Liberation Army
