= Northern Ireland Security Guard Service =

- Cap Badge of the Northern Ireland Security Guard Service
- Abbreviation: NISGS

Agency overview
- Formed: 1998
- Employees: 400+

Jurisdictional structure
- Operations jurisdiction: Northern Ireland, UK
- Governing body: Ministry of Defence

Operational structure
- Headquarters: NISGS HQ, 38 Irish Brigade, Thiepval Barracks, Lisburn
- Parent agency: MOD

The Northern Ireland Security Guard Service (NISGS) is a civilian organisation of the Ministry of Defence that provides armed security at military establishments in Northern Ireland.

It was founded in 1998 following the Good Friday Agreement and is a unionised, non-industrial civilian security guard organisation under the authority of the General Officer Commanding (Northern Ireland), who holds ultimate responsibility for the operation of the organisation. The NISGS works alongside the unarmed Ministry of Defence Guard Service (MGS).

In the rest of the United Kingdom, armed security is the responsibility of the Military Provost Guard Service, made up of service personnel.

== Civilian security officer - Armed ==
As a MOD Civil Servant, a NISGS Civilian Security Officer (CSO) is authorised to be armed when on duty in accordance with provisions within The Firearms (Northern Ireland) Order 2004 and the CDS Arming Directive.

== Massereene Barracks incident ==
In 2009 CSOs at Massereene Barracks were criticised for not opening fire during an incident in which two British soldiers were killed when the barracks was attacked by members of the Irish republican paramilitary group, the Real IRA who were armed with AKM automatic rifles. However the actions of the CSOs were praised by Brigadier George Norton, the Army's most senior soldier in Northern Ireland at the time. This was the first time that a barracks guarded by the NISGS had come under a direct attack.

Following the incident plans were made to retrain and rearm CSOs belonging to NISGS.

== Uniform and equipment ==
NISGS CSOs wear a black coloured combat uniform, which includes trousers and smock and navy beret as well as black combat boots. The uniform looks very similar to that of army EOD personnel but with the notable differences being the NISGS capbadge and rankslides. The NISGS uniform was reviewed in late 2021, the review seen the removal of the military style beret and replaced with a modern looking police style baseball cap. The principal reason for NISGS' creation after the Good Friday Agreement was to place the guarding of MOD premises in the Province on a primarily civilian footing with military backup, as in mainland UK. It was felt that establishing the Military Provost Guard Service (MPGS) in the Province would still be seen as an overtly "military" force.

Because the Crown is exempt from the provisions of the Firearms Acts, crown servants may carry firearms in the course of their duties if duly authorised to do so. Conversely, the MOD Guard Service are not authorised to carry firearms in Northern Ireland, as well as in Great Britain where the Military Provost Guard Service provides armed guarding. In addition to the Crown firearms exemption, attesting NISGS CSOs as Special Constables allows them to be armed on the same basis as PSNI Police Officers Part Time, the equivalent of mainland Special Constables.

As of Feb 2021 CSOs of the Northern Ireland Security Guard Service are no longer sworn in as Special Constables and all prior members of the security guard service have had their SC (Special Constable) status removed under a formal review from 38X Bde known as the NISGS Optimization Project.

=== Firearms ===
Prior to the Masseerene Barracks incident NISGS CSOs were armed with the venerable L9A1 9mm Browning Hi-Power single-action automatic pistol, primarily and deliberately for self-defence. Following that incident and the recognition that the very short accurate range generally achievable with any pistol even under ideal conditions was a factor in not returning fire in that incident, NISGS CSOs were quickly re-armed with the L85A2 Individual Weapon. This is a 5.56 mm calibre selective fire assault rifle, generally referred to as the 'SA80', and was the current standard UK military issue personal weapon at the time.

These were readily available from MOD stocks as an interim solution but were accepted to be overly powerful for the NISGS armed guarding role because of the long lethal range (up to 500 metres (1,600 ft)) and short-range over-penetration of the ammunition, and the availability of fully automatic fire. In early 2012 an agreement was reached between MOD and PSNI to acquire surplus Heckler & Koch MP5 9mm submachine guns from PSNI to re-arm NISGS CSOs. These weapons with their less powerful and shorter-lethal-range 9mm Parabellum pistol ammunition, provides NISGS with a more appropriate firearm for their role.

== See also ==
- Ministry of Defence Police
- Ministry of Defence Guard Service (equivalent unarmed force in Great Britain)
- Military Provost Guard Service
- Germany Guard Service
- Northern Ireland Prison Service
- Policing in Northern Ireland
- Police Service of Northern Ireland
- Law enforcement in the United Kingdom
- List of law enforcement agencies in the United Kingdom, Crown Dependencies and British Overseas Territories
- Security police
