= Stephen Carroll =

Stephen Carroll may refer to:

- Stephen Carroll (musician)
- Stephen Carroll (footballer)
- Stephen Carroll, murdered Police Service of Northern Ireland officer

== See also ==
- Steve Carroll, American sports broadcaster
- Steven Carroll, Australian novelist
