= Continuity Irish Republican Army =

Irish republican paramilitary group split from the Provisional IRA in 1986

- Óglaigh na hÉireann
- Leadership: Continuity Army Council
- Dates active: 1986–present
- Allegiance: Irish Republic (Note: Irish republicans do not recognise any of the Irish states since 1922, but declare their allegiance to the extinct Republic of 1919–21.)
- Groups: Republican Sinn Féin (political wing); Fianna Éireann (youth wing); Cumann na mBan (women's wing)
- Active regions: Northern Ireland (mainly); Republic of Ireland
- Ideology: Physical force Irish republicanism; Irish nationalism; Irish republican legitimism; Dissident republicanism; Éire Nua
- Size: About 50 (as of July 2012)
- Wars: The Troubles (1986–1998); Dissident Irish republican campaign

The Continuity Irish Republican Army (Continuity IRA or CIRA), styling itself as the Irish Republican Army (Irish: Óglaigh na hÉireann), is an Irish republican paramilitary group that aims to bring about a united Ireland. It claims to be a direct continuation of the original Irish Republican Army and the national army of the Irish Republic that was proclaimed in 1916. It emerged from a split in the Provisional IRA in 1986 but did not become active until the Provisional IRA ceasefire of 1994. It is an illegal organisation in the Republic of Ireland and is designated a terrorist organisation in the United Kingdom, New Zealand and the United States. It has links with the political party Republican Sinn Féin (RSF).

Since 1994, the CIRA has waged a campaign in Northern Ireland against the British Army and the Police Service of Northern Ireland (PSNI), formerly the Royal Ulster Constabulary. This is part of a wider campaign against the British security forces by dissident republican paramilitaries. It has targeted the security forces in gun attacks and bombings, as well as with grenades, mortars and rockets. The CIRA has also carried out bombings with the goal of causing economic harm and/or disruption, as well as many punishment attacks on alleged criminals.

To date, it has been responsible for the death of one PSNI officer. The CIRA was smaller and less active than the now-defunct Real IRA, and there have been a number of splits within the organisation since the mid-2000s.

== Origins ==
The Continuity IRA has its origins in a split in the Provisional IRA. In September 1986, the Provisional IRA held a General Army Convention (GAC), the organisation's supreme decision-making body. It was the first GAC in 16 years. The meeting, which like all such meetings was secret, was convened to discuss among other resolutions, the articles of the Provisional IRA constitution which dealt with abstentionism, specifically its opposition to the taking of seats in Dáil Éireann (the parliament of the Republic of Ireland). The GAC passed motions (by the necessary two-thirds majority) allowing members of the Provisional IRA to discuss and debate the taking of parliamentary seats, and the removal of the ban on members of the organisation from supporting any successful republican candidate who took their seat in Dáil Éireann.

The Provisional IRA convention delegates opposed to the change in the constitution claimed that the convention was gerrymandered "by the creation of new IRA organisational structures for the convention, including the combinations of Sligo-Roscommon-Longford and Wicklow-Wexford-Waterford." The only IRA body that supported this viewpoint was the outgoing IRA Executive. Those members of the outgoing Executive who opposed the change comprised a quorum. They met, dismissed those in favour of the change, and set up a new Executive. They contacted Tom Maguire, who was a commander in the old IRA and had supported the Provisionals against the Official IRA (see Irish republican legitimatism), and asked him for support. Maguire had also been contacted by supporters of Gerry Adams, then president of Sinn Féin, and a supporter of the change in the Provisional IRA constitution.

Maguire rejected Adams' supporters, supported the IRA Executive members opposed to the change, and named the new organisers the Continuity Army Council. In a 1986 statement, he rejected "the legitimacy of an Army Council styling itself the Council of the Irish Republican Army which lends support to any person or organisation styling itself as Sinn Féin and prepared to enter the partition parliament of Leinster House." In 1987, Maguire described the "Continuity Executive" as the "lawful Executive of the Irish Republican Army."

== Campaign ==
Initially, the Continuity IRA did not reveal its existence, either in the form of press statements or paramilitary activity. Although the Garda Síochána had suspicions that the organisation existed, they were unsure of its name, labelling it the "Irish National Republican Army". On 21 January 1994, on the 75th anniversary of the First Dáil Éireann, a group of men in paramilitary dress offered a "final salute" to Tom Maguire by firing over his grave. A public statement headed "Irish Republican Publicity Bureau" signed "B Ó Ruairc, Rúnaí [Secretary]" identifying the firing party as "Volunteers of Óglaigh na hÉireann-the Irish Republican Army", and two accompanying photos were published in Saoirse Irish Freedom. Garda Special Branch detectives raided the headquarters of Republican Sinn Féin at Arran Quay, Dublin, two days after the graveside volley, seizing files and questioning staff. In February 1994 it was reported that in previous months Gardaí had found arms dumps along the Cooley Peninsula in County Louth that did not belong to the Provisional IRA, and forensics tests determined had been used for firing practice recently.

It was only after the Provisional IRA declared a ceasefire in 1994 that the Continuity IRA became active, announcing its intention to continue the campaign against British rule. The CIRA continues to oppose the Good Friday Agreement and, unlike the Provisional IRA (and the Real IRA in 1998), the CIRA has not announced a ceasefire or agreed to participate in weapons decommissioning—nor is there any evidence that it will. In the 18th Independent Monitoring Commission's report, the RIRA, the CIRA and the Irish National Liberation Army (INLA) were deemed a potential future threat. The CIRA was labelled "active, dangerous and committed and... capable of a greater level of violent and other crime". Like the RIRA and RIRA splinter group Óglaigh na hÉireann, it too sought funds for expansion. It is also known to have worked with the INLA.

The CIRA has been involved in a number of bombing and shooting incidents. Targets of the CIRA have included the British military, the Northern Ireland police (both the Royal Ulster Constabulary and its successor the Police Service of Northern Ireland). Since the Good Friday Agreement in 1998 the CIRA, along with other paramilitaries opposing the ceasefire, have been involved with a countless number of punishment shootings and beatings. By 2005 the CIRA was believed to be an established presence on the island of Great Britain with the capability of launching attacks. A bomb defused in Dublin in December 2005 was believed to have been the work of the CIRA. In February 2006, the Independent Monitoring Commission (IMC) blamed the CIRA for planting four bombs in Northern Ireland during the final quarter of 2005, as well as several hoax bomb warnings. The IMC also blamed the CIRA for the killings of two former CIRA members in Belfast, who had stolen CIRA weapons and established a rival organisation. The CIRA continued to be active in both planning and undertaking attacks on the PSNI. The IMC said they tried to lure police into ambushes, while they have also taken to stoning and using petrol bombs. In addition, other assaults, robbery, tiger kidnapping, extortion, fuel laundering and smuggling were undertaken by the group. The CIRA also actively took part in recruiting and training members, including disgruntled former Provisional IRA members. As a result of this continued activity the IMC said the group remained "a very serious threat".

On 10 March 2009 the CIRA claimed responsibility for the fatal shooting of a PSNI officer in Craigavon, County Armagh—the first police fatality in Northern Ireland since 1998. The officer was fatally shot by a sniper as he and a colleague investigated "suspicious activity" at a house nearby when a window was smashed by youths causing the occupant to phone the police. The PSNI officers responded to the emergency call, giving a CIRA sniper the chance to shoot and kill officer Stephen Carroll. Carroll was killed two days after the Real IRA's 2009 Massereene Barracks shooting at Massereene Barracks in Antrim. In a press interview with Republican Sinn Féin some days later, regarded by some to be the political wing of the Continuity IRA, Richard Walsh described the attacks as "acts of war".

In 2013, the Continuity IRA's 'South Down Brigade' threatened a Traveller family in Newry and published a statement in the local newspaper. There were negotiations with community representatives and the CIRA announced the threat was lifted. It was believed the threat was issued after a Traveller feud which resulted in a pipe bomb attack in Bessbrook, near Newry. The Continuity IRA is believed to be strongest in the County Fermanagh – North County Armagh area (Craigavon, Armagh and Lurgan). It is believed to be behind a number of attacks such as pipe bombings, rocket attacks, gun attacks, and the PSNI claimed it orchestrated riots a number of times to lure police officers into areas such as Kilwilkie in Lurgan and Drumbeg in Craigavon in order to attack them. It also claimed the group orchestrated a riot during a security alert in Lurgan. The alert turned out to be a hoax.

On Easter 2016, the Continuity IRA marched in paramilitary uniforms through North Lurgan, Co Armagh, without any hindrance from the PSNI who monitored the parade from a police helicopter.

In July and August 2019 the CIRA carried out attempted bomb attacks on the PSNI in Craigavon, County Armagh and Wattlebridge, County Fermanagh.

On 5 February 2020, a bomb planted by the CIRA was found by the PSNI in a lorry in Lurgan. The CIRA believed the lorry was going to be put on a North Channel ferry to Scotland in January 2020.

== Claim to legitimacy ==
Similar to the claim put forward by the Provisional IRA after its split from the Official IRA in 1969, the Continuity IRA claims to be the legitimate continuation of the original Irish Republican Army or Óglaigh na hÉireann. This argument is based on the view that the surviving anti-Treaty members of the Second Dáil delegated their "authority" to the IRA Army Council in 1938. As further justification for this claim, Tom Maguire, one of those anti-Treaty members of the Second Dáil, issued a statement in favour of the Continuity IRA, just as he had done in 1969 in favour of the Provisionals. J. Bowyer Bell, in his The Irish Troubles, describes Maguire's opinion in 1986: "abstentionism was a basic tenet of republicanism, a moral issue of principle. Abstentionism gave the movement legitimacy, the right to wage war, to speak for a Republic all but established in the hearts of the people". Maguire's stature was such that a delegation from Gerry Adams sought his support in 1986, but was rejected.

== Relationship to other organisations ==
These changes within the IRA were accompanied by changes on the political side and at the 1986 Sinn Féin Ard Fheis (party conference), which followed the IRA Convention, the party's policy of abstentionism, which forbade Sinn Féin elected representatives from taking seats in the Oireachtas, the parliament of the Republic, was dropped. On 2 November, the 628 delegates present cast their votes, the result being 429 to 161. The traditionalists, having lost at both conventions, walked out of the Mansion House, met that evening at the West County Hotel, and reformed as Republican Sinn Féin (RSF).

According to a report in the Cork Examiner, the Continuity IRA's first chief of staff was Dáithí Ó Conaill, who also served as the first chairman of RSF from 1986 to 1987. The Continuity IRA and RSF perceive themselves as forming a "true" Republican Movement.

== Structure and status ==
The leadership of the Continuity IRA is believed to be based in the provinces of Munster and Ulster. It was alleged that its chief of staff was a Limerick man and that a number of other key members were from that county, until their expulsion. Dáithí Ó Conaill was the first chief of staff until 1991. In 2004 the United States government believed the Continuity IRA consisted of fewer than fifty hardcore activists. In 2005, Minister for Justice, Equality and Law Reform Michael McDowell told Dáil Éireann that the organisation had a maximum of 150 members.

The CIRA is an illegal organisation under UK (section 11(1) of the Terrorism Act 2000) and ROI law due to the use of 'IRA' in the group's name, in a situation analogous to that of the Real Irish Republican Army (RIRA). Membership of the organisation is punishable by a sentence of up to ten years imprisonment under UK law. On 31 May 2001 Dermot Gannon became the first person to be convicted of membership of the CIRA solely on the word of a Garda Síochána chief superintendent. On 13 July 2004, the US government designated the CIRA as a 'Foreign Terrorist Organization'. This made it illegal for Americans to provide material support to the CIRA, requires US financial institutions to block the group's assets and denies alleged CIRA members visas into the US.

== External aid and arsenal ==
The US government suspects the Continuity IRA of having received funds and arms from supporters in the United States. Security sources in Ireland have expressed the suspicion that, in co-operation with the RIRA, the Continuity IRA may have acquired arms and materiel from the Balkans. They also suspect that the Continuity IRA arsenal contains some weapons that were taken from Provisional IRA arms dumps, including a few dozen rifles, machine guns, and pistols; a small amount of the explosive Semtex; and a few dozen detonators.

== Internal tension and splits ==
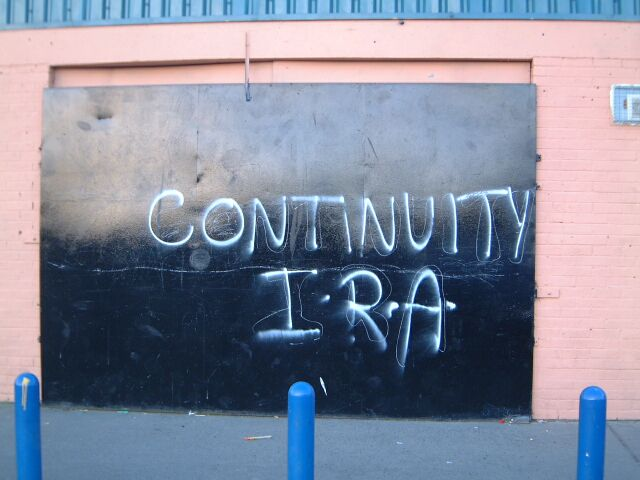
Graffito in Dublin in support of the Continuity IRA (2004)

In 2005, several members of the CIRA, who were serving prison sentences in Portlaoise Prison for paramilitary activity, left the organisation. Some transferred to the INLA landing of the prison, but the majority of those who left are now independent and on E4 landing. The remaining CIRA prisoners have moved to D Wing. Supporters of the Continuity IRA leadership claim that this resulted from an internal disagreement, which although brought to a conclusion, was followed by some people leaving the organisation anyway. Supporters of the disaffected members established the Concerned Group for Republican Prisoners. Most of those who had left went back to the CIRA, or dissociated themselves from the CGRP, which is now defunct.

In February 2006, the Independent Monitoring Commission claimed in a report on paramilitary activity that two groups, styling themselves as "Óglaigh na hÉireann" and "Saoirse na hÉireann", had been formed after a split in the Continuity IRA either in early 2006 or late 2005. The Óglaigh na hÉireann group was responsible for a number of pipe bomb attacks on the PSNI, bomb hoaxes, and robberies, the IMC also claimed the organisation was responsible for the killing of Andrew Burns on 12 February 2008 and was seeking to recruit former members of the RIRA. The Saoirse na hÉireann (SNH) group was composed of "disaffected and largely young republicans" and was responsible for a number of bomb hoaxes, two of which took place in September 2006. It was thought to have operated largely in republican areas of Belfast . The groups had apparently ceased operations by early 2009.

In 2007, the Continuity IRA was responsible for shooting dead two of its members who had left and attempted to create their own organisation. Upon leaving the CIRA, they had allegedly taken a number of guns with them. The Continuity IRA is believed by Gardaí to have been involved in a number of gangland killings in Dublin and Limerick.

In July 2010, members of a "militant Northern-based faction within the CIRA" claimed to have overthrown the leadership of the organisation. They also claimed that an Army Convention representing "95 per cent of volunteers" had unanimously elected a new 12-member Army Executive, which in turn appointed a new seven-member Army Council. The moves came as a result of dissatisfaction with the southern-based leadership and the apparent winding-down of military operations. A senior source from RSF said: "We would see them [the purported new leadership] as just another splinter group that has broken away." This organisation is referred to as the Real CIRA.

In June 2011 CIRA member Liam Kenny was murdered, allegedly by drug dealers, at his home in Clondalkin, West Dublin. On 28 November 2011 an innocent man was mistakenly shot dead in retaliation for the murder of Liam Kenny. Limerick Real IRA volunteer Rose Lynch pleaded guilty to this murder at the Special Criminal Court and was sentenced to life imprisonment.

In July 2012 the CIRA announced it had a new leadership after expelling members who had been working against the organisation.

In April 2014 a former leading member of the Belfast Continuity IRA who had been expelled from the organisation, Tommy Crossan, was shot dead.

== In popular culture ==
The CIRA are depicted in RTÉ's TV series crime drama Love/Hate.
