= Ministry of Defence Guard Service =

British civil service security agency

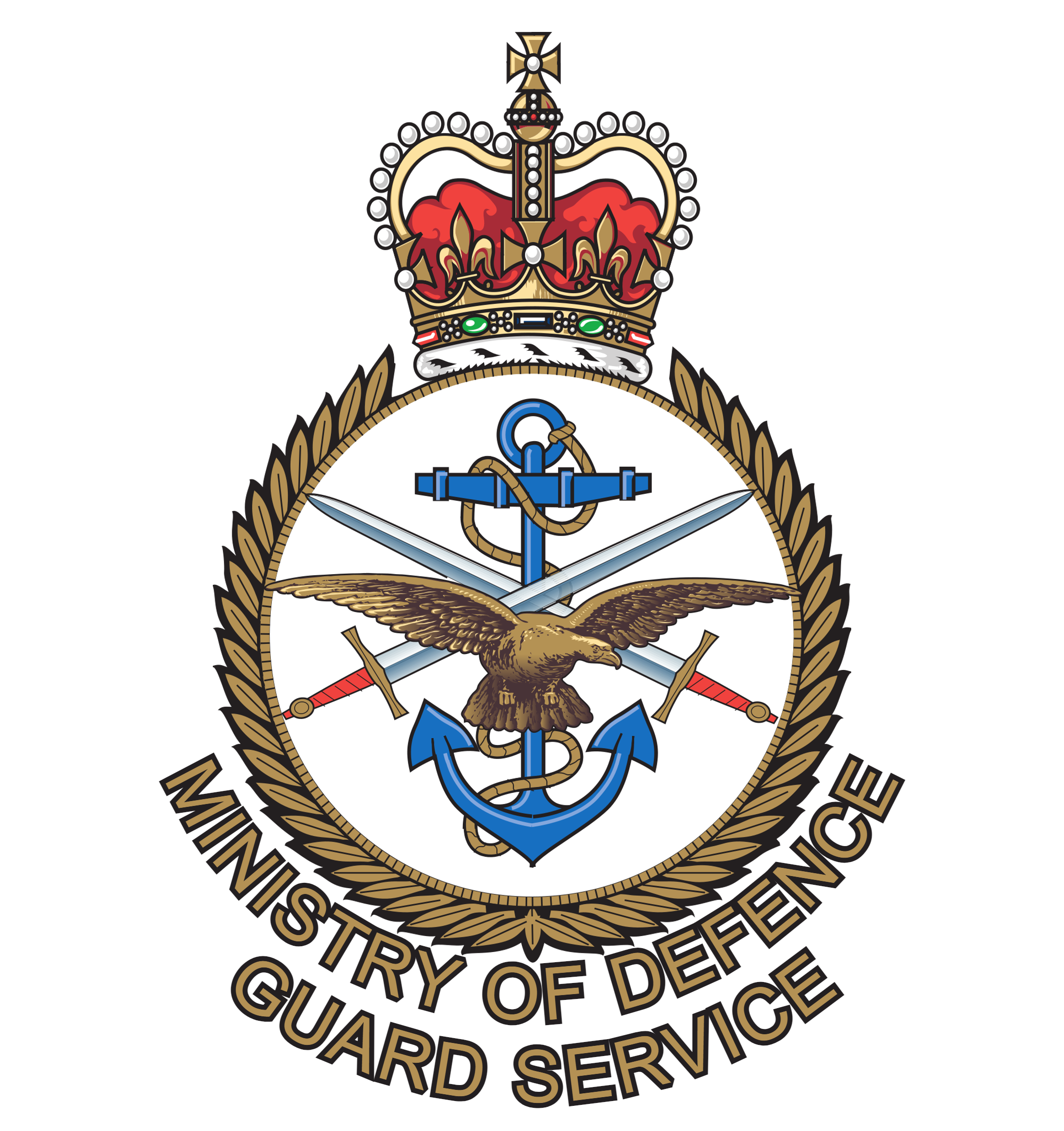
- MOD Guard Service Patch and Insignia

Agency overview
- Formed: 1992
- Preceding agencies: Ministry of Defence Guard Force; Ministry of Defence Police and Guarding Agency
- Type: Unarmed Guarding
- Employees: 2,500+
- Annual budget: £116.8 million (2012/13)
- Agency executive: Mark Wakeford, Head of Unarmed Guarding
- Parent agency: Defence Infrastructure Organisation
- Website: Official Website

The Ministry of Defence Guard Service (MGS) is part of the Defence Infrastructure Organisation of the Ministry of Defence. It provides defence establishments across the United Kingdom with guarding and patrol services and was established in response to the Deal Barracks bombing. The Guard Service is one of the few remaining uniformed Civil Service agencies within the UK, and has been described as an elite guarding service.

The MGS is responsible for access and pass control, initial response, key control, vehicle and personnel searches, security patrols of buildings and perimeter fences, dog patrols, CCTV and alarm monitoring. It also undertakes additional duties includinglicopter marshalling, first aid provision, mail and baggage screening, security sweeps, health and safety guidance, and cordoning off suspected bomb threats.

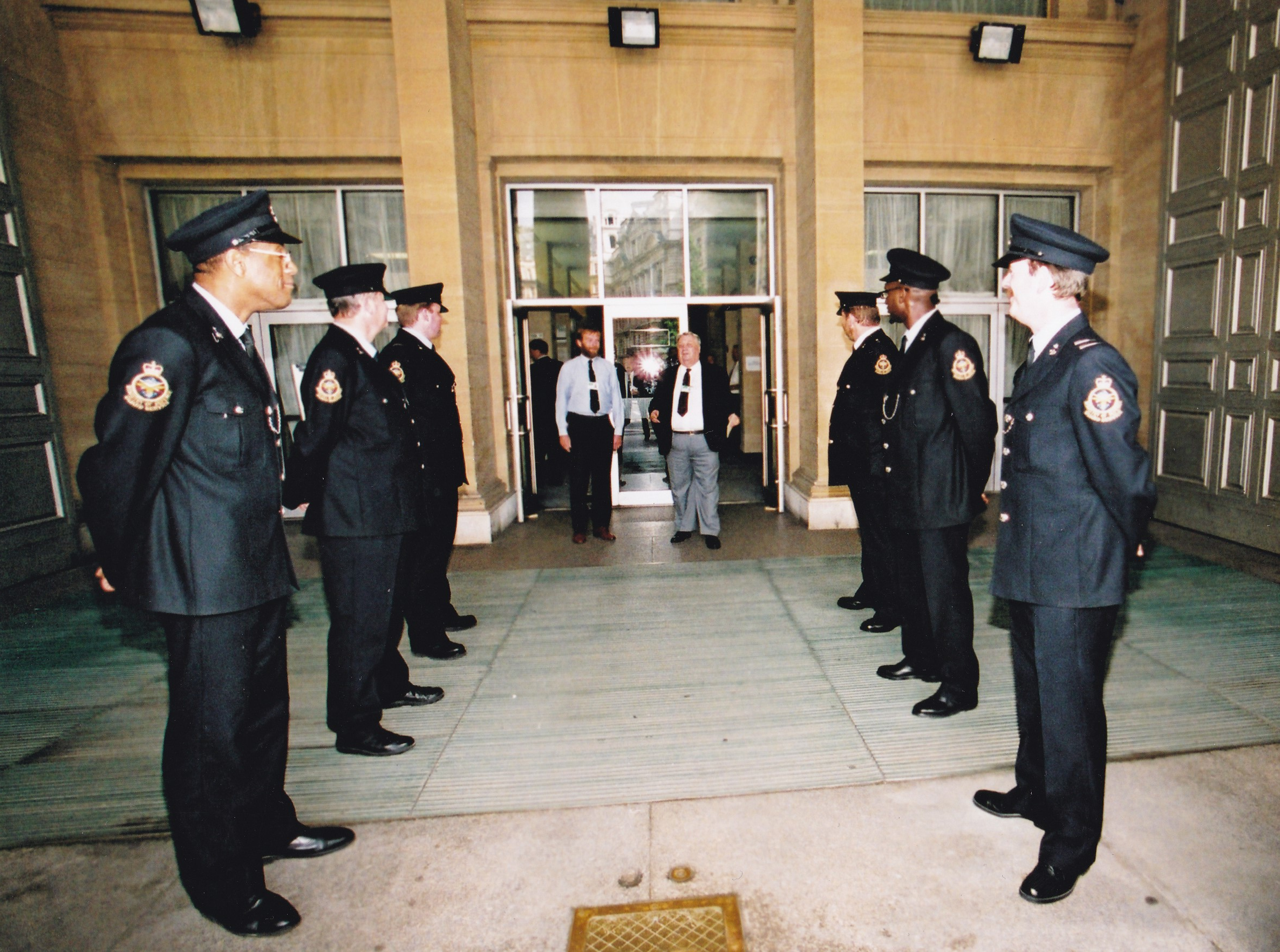
MGS Officers wearing tunics at Whitehall line the outer foyer for a VIP

== Organisation and grades ==
The non-uniformed staff in the MGS cover a range of business management functions and grades, including secretariat, service delivery, assurance, personnel management, training, standards, and stores.

Grades are often referred to by staff using the antiquated grading system (e.g. CSO4 may be referred to as a "four" and CSO5 a "five"). The MGS also has support, administrative, and managerial staff, including programme and project managers, training staff, and communications staff.

Ministry of Defence Guard Service grades and insignia
Rank	BRM	AOM	OM	CSO4	CSO5
Epaulette insignia					Epaulette denoting 'MOD Guard Service'

== Dog section ==
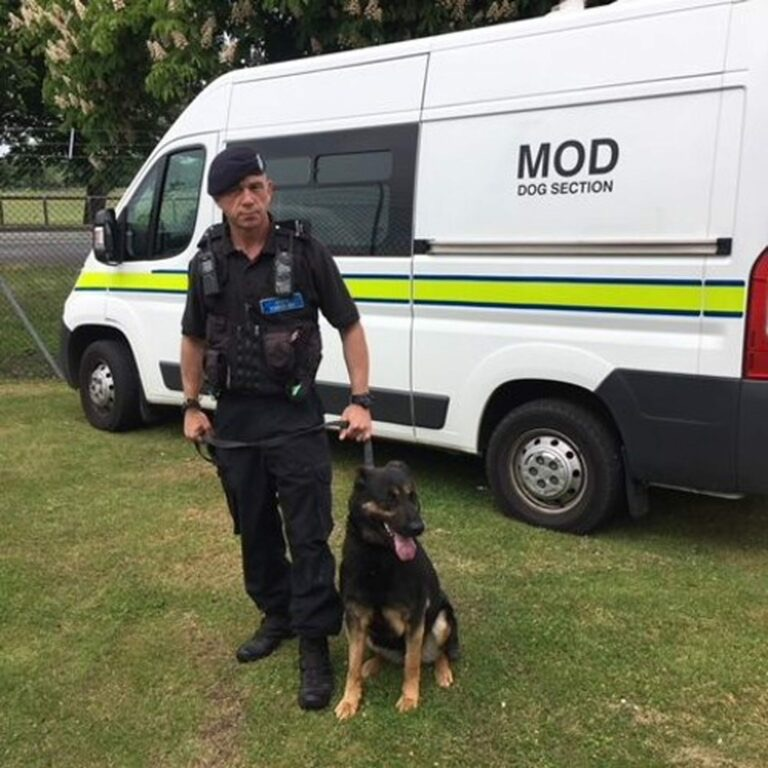
MGS Dog Handler with his Military Working Dog in front of an MOD Carrier van

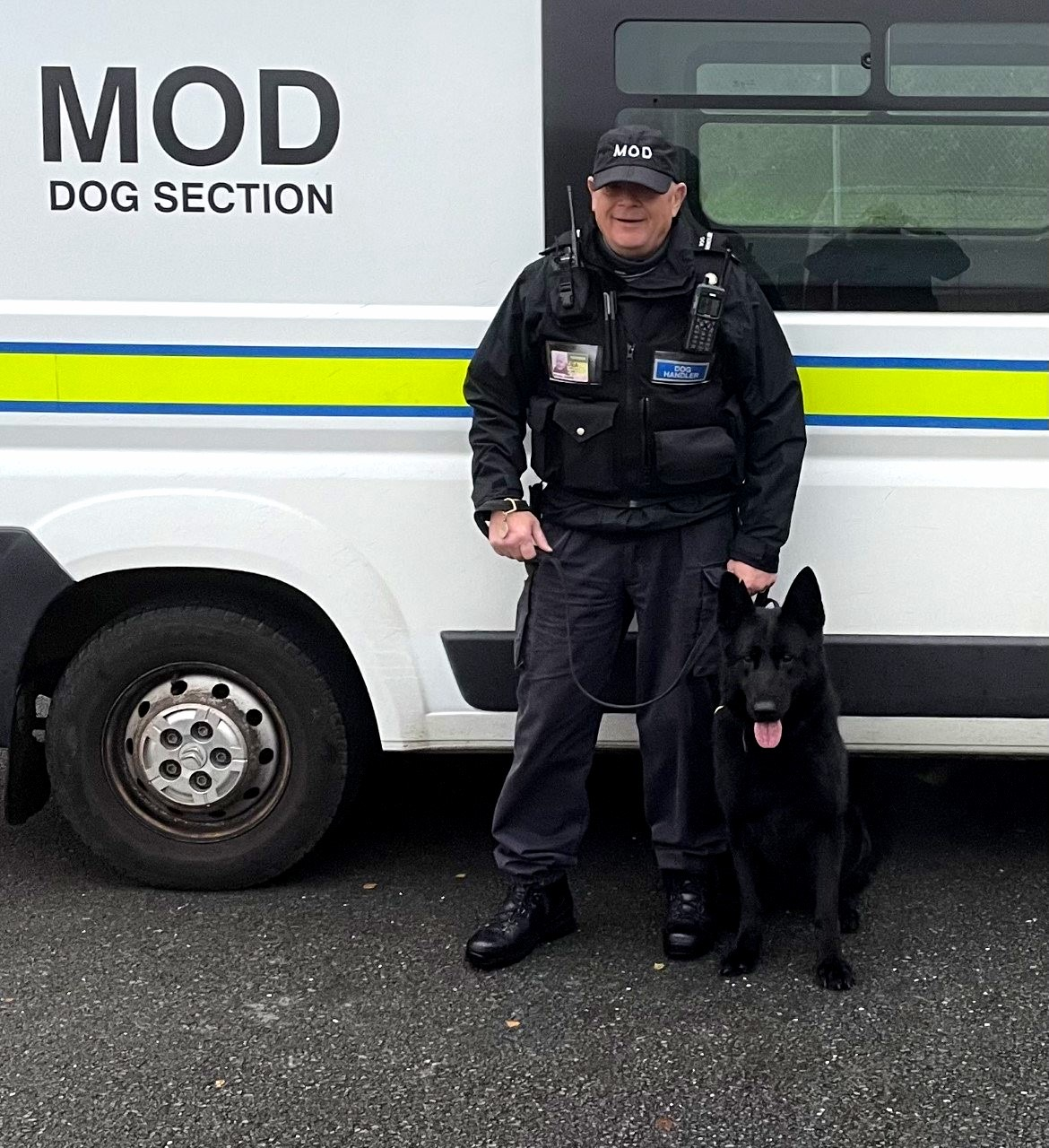
A handler wearing a foldable MOD baseball cap displays his dog in front of an MOD Dog Section Carrier.

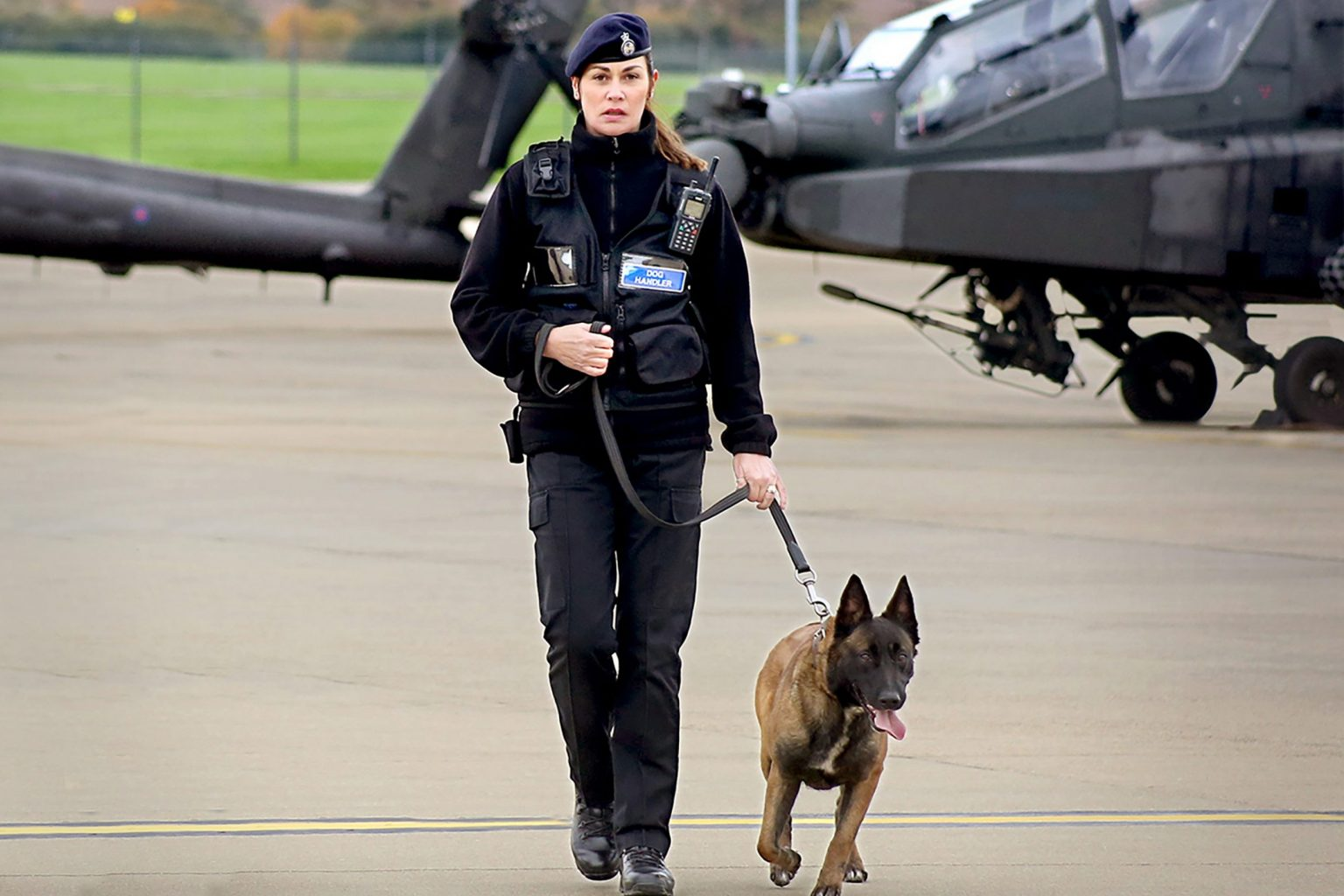
An officer from the MOD Guard Service's Dog Section patrolling nearby some Apache helicopters at RAF Lakenheath

The MGS has its own dog section, made up of CSO5 (dog handlers) and military working dogs (MWDs), which provide support to other staff. The working dogs are a requirement for some MoD stations' licensing requirements to hold, store, and distribute arms and ammunition, as well as other vital assets. The dogs within the MGS are recognised as force multipliers, with the MGS stating that one dog team is as efficient as four officers working a beat patrol. The dog section adheres to MoD, military, and statutory standards for training and welfare, and is subject to the rules of engagement when encountering fleeing suspects on defence estates.

== Performance ==
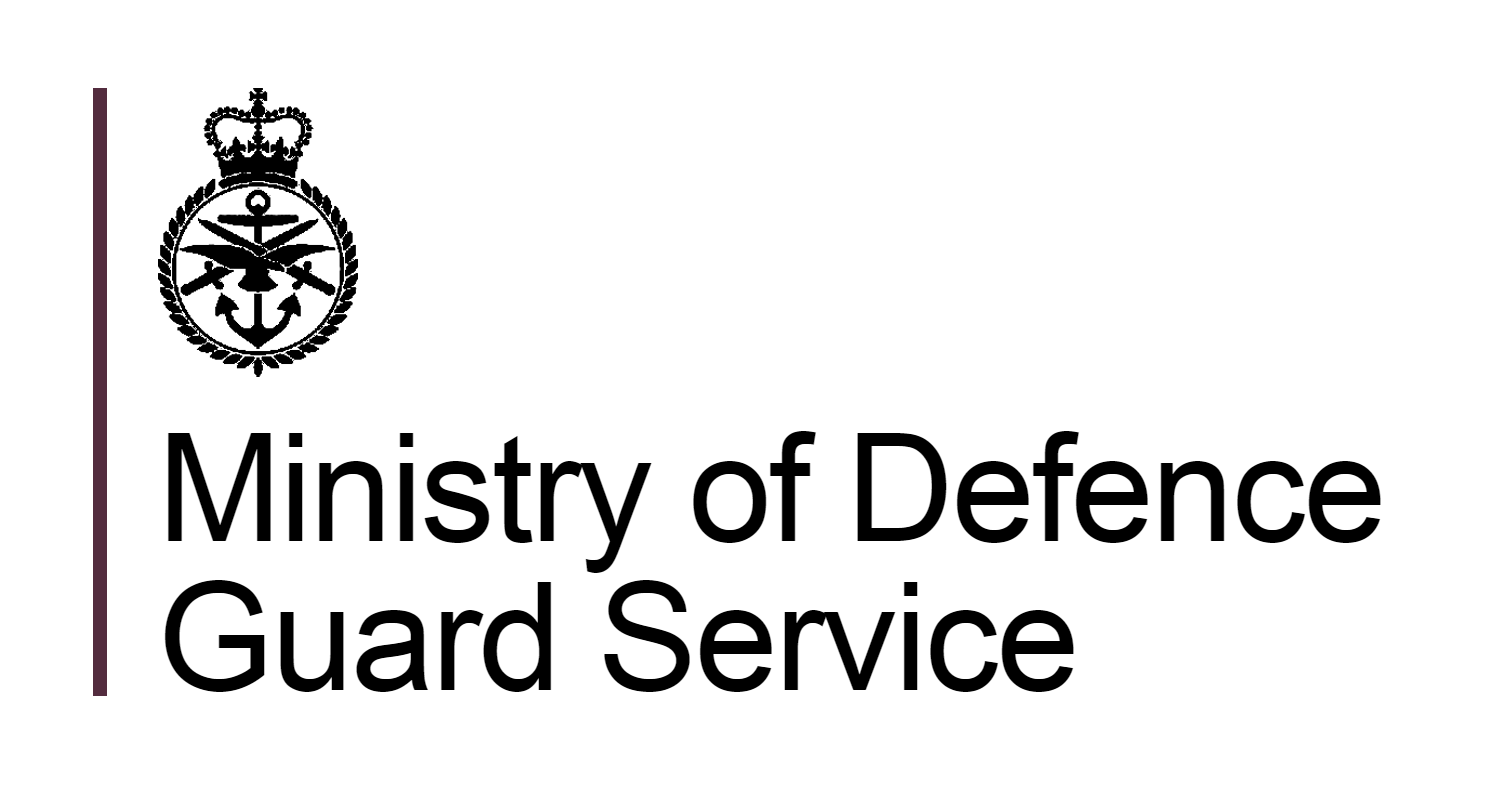
MOD Guard Service Logo under UK Government Regulations

The MGS's standards are maintained through external accreditation. They hold the following awards:

- National Security Inspectorate (NSI) Gold Standard
- Customer Service Excellence (CSE) Award
- Committed to Equality (C2E) Award
- Government Security Team of the Year Award 2021

== History ==
From 2004 to 2013, MGS and Ministry of Defence Police worked within the Ministry of Defence Police and Guarding Agency, and were based out of MDPGA Wethersfield (previously RAF Wethersfield) in Essex. In April 2013, the MDPGA was disbanded, and the MGS joined the Defence Infrastructure Organisation.

From 2019 to 2020, MoD Guard Service personnel completed around 800,000 personal and vehicle searches across the Defence estate, confiscated over 9,000 out-of-date security and vehicle passes, reported just under 3,000 security breaches, and completed over 117,000 environmental/energy conservation actions whilst undertaking patrols.

=== Operation Riverbank ===
At the request of the UK Border Force, various officers from the MGS assisted in border operations during a seven-week period whilst the London 2012 Olympics were ongoing. This included detached duties to London Heathrow, Stansted Airport, Coquelles, and potentially other ports as part of operations that were left undocumented in the public domain. This detachment was completed alongside the MoD Police, and officers were trained at MDPGA Wethersfield in order to work on the borders effectively.

== Uniform and equipment ==
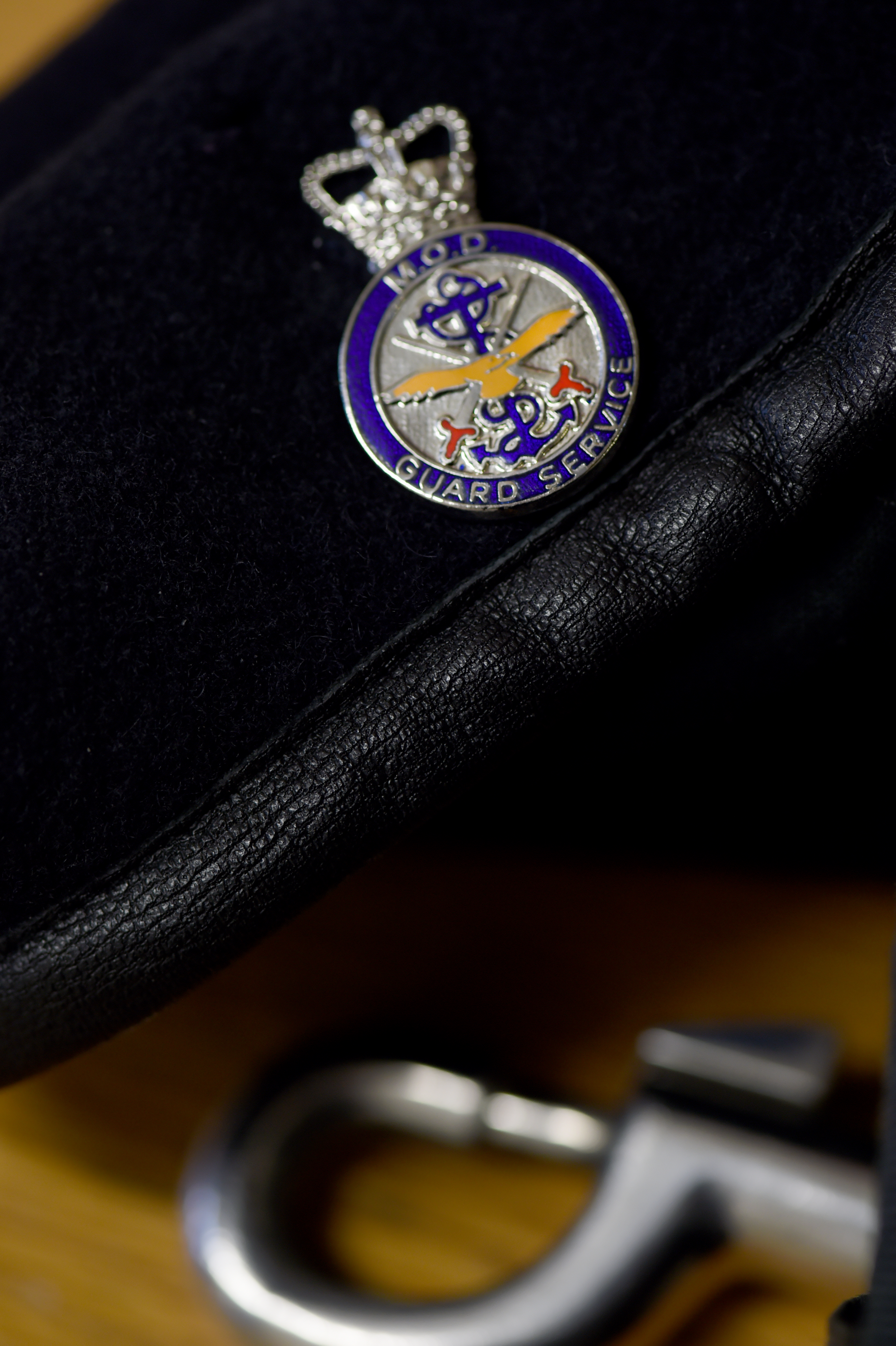
MOD Guard Service beret and cap-badge

While the MGS are a guarding organisation, it wears a similar uniform to police forces such as the MET Police Service. This consists of:

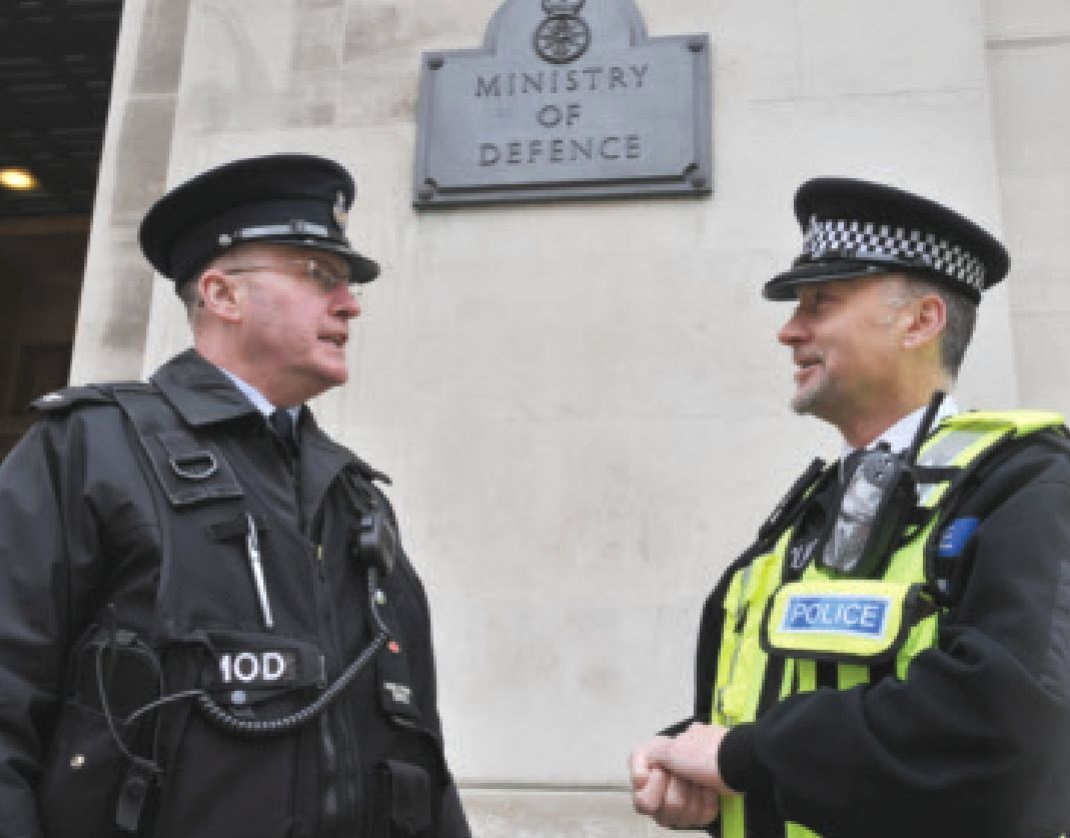
Officers from the MDP and MGS in public at Whitehall, London

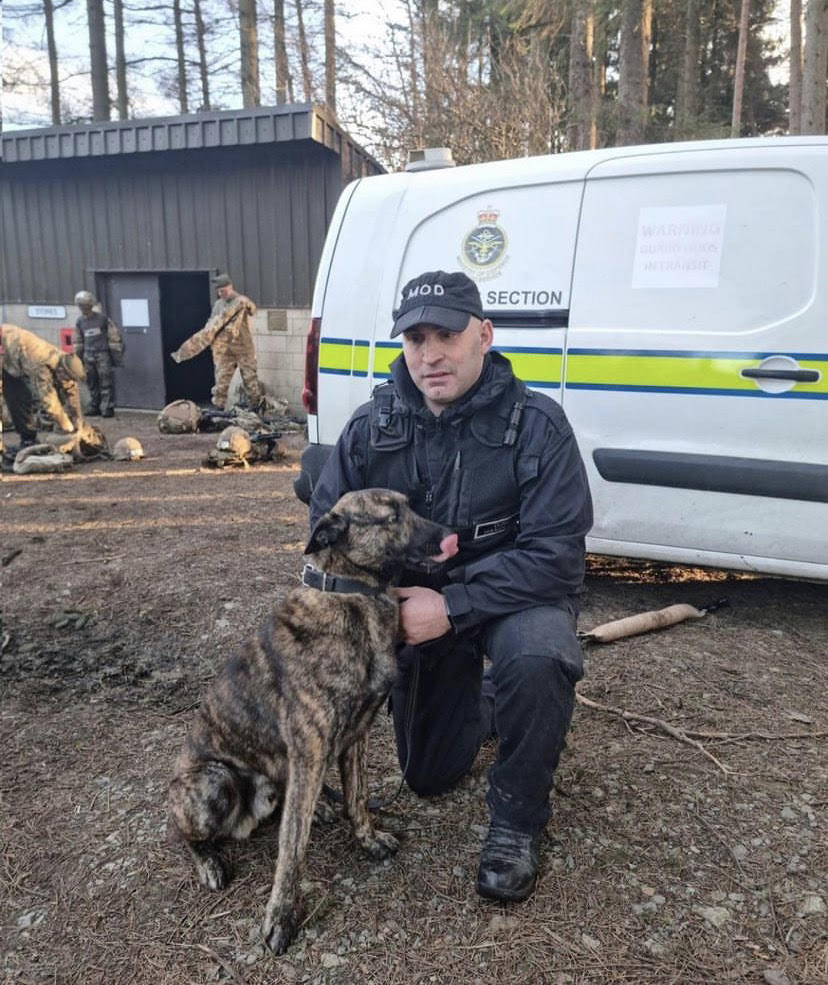
MGS Dog Handler on a joint exercise with the Army

=== Standard issue CSO uniform ===
- Short-sleeved white shirt (summer dress)
- Long-sleeved white shirt (winter dress)
- NATO "woolly-pulley" navy blue jumper
- Dark navy blue peaked cap (with MGS cap badge)
- Dark navy blue beret (only issued to officers stationed at air bases that host the United States Air Force)
- Black trousers (black combat trousers sometimes worn)
- Duty kit belt
- Black steel-toe-capped boots or shoes (officer specific)
- Black epaulettes denoting "MoD Guard Service" and grade
- Black waterproof trousers
- Black waterproof hat cover
- High visibility (printed with "MoD Security" in a navy blue box on breast and back)
  - High visibility light vest
  - High visibility fleece (no epaulettes)
  - High visibility waterproof coat
- Black British Army MkII combat glove

=== Additional dog section uniform ===
- Dark navy blue beret (with MGS cap badge)
- Black waterproof/foldable cap denoting "MoD"
- Black equipment vest
- Black field jacket
- Combat/cargo trousers

=== Other uniform ===
- Black polo shirt with "MGS" logo on breast
- White overalls (for vehicle searching)
- Sealskin "beanie" hat
- High-visibility vest
- Official MOD Guard Service tunic (number two) worn on special occasions
- Stab vest denoting department and role "MoD Security"

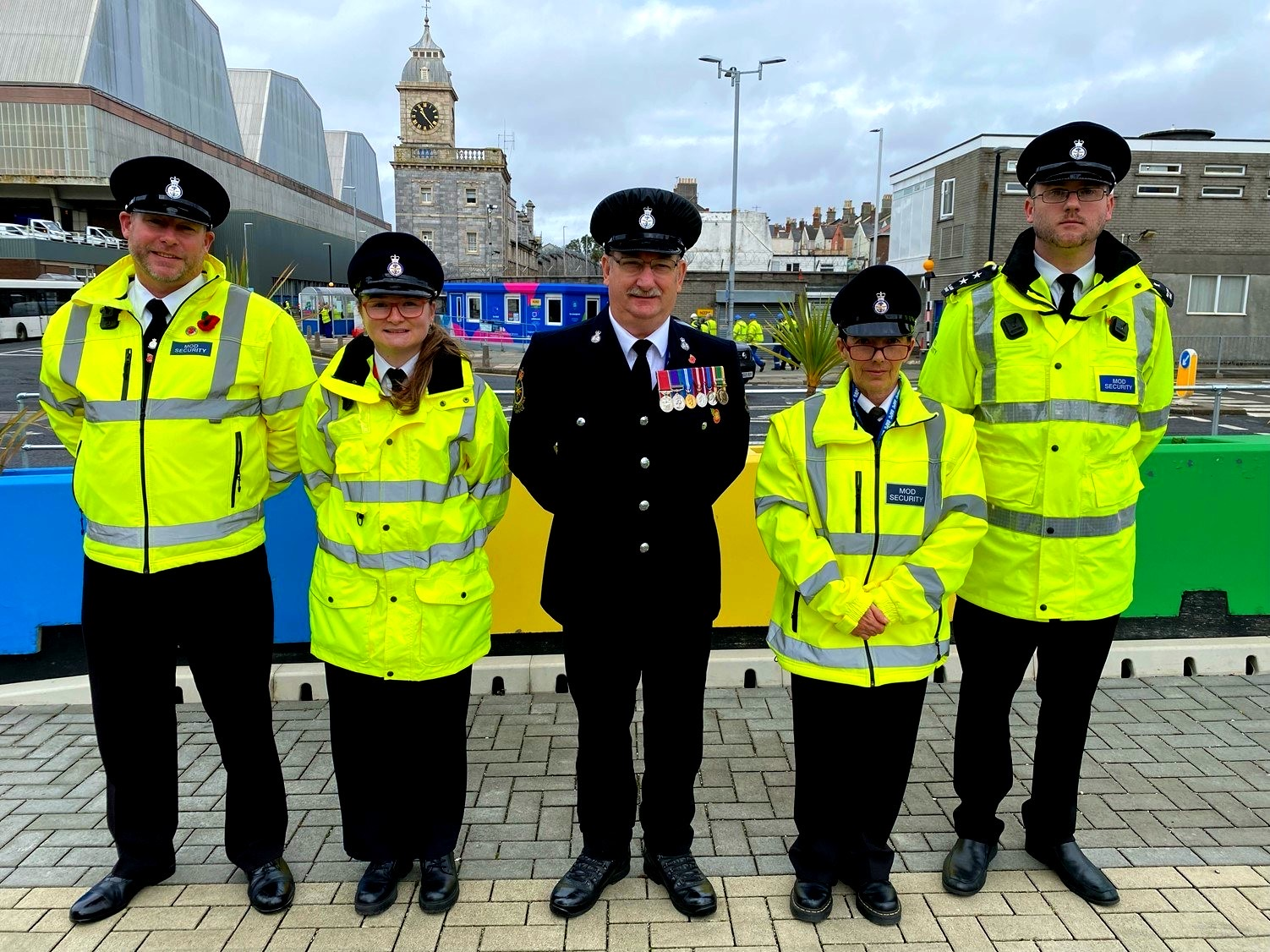
5 officers celebrate Remembrance Day 2022, one officer is a MGS Tunic displaying a rack of medals.

=== Equipment ===
Equipment carried can include but is not limited to:

- Air-wave radio
- LED torch or Maglite
- First aid kit
- Acid attack kit
- Vehicle search equipment
- Security-infringement paperwork
- Fire safety management plans
- Official personal notebook (PNB) and pen

== Foundation training ==
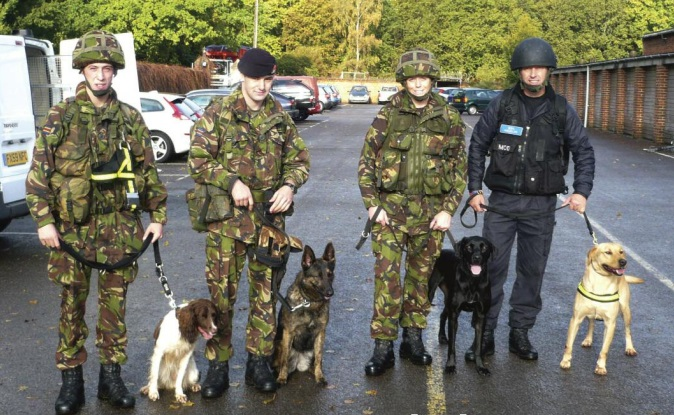
MoD Guard Serviceman (right) taking part in an arms/explosives dog handling course with members of the British Army

Currently, MGS officers are expected to attend a ten-day foundation course which includes industry-leading training and equips officers with skills regarding service delivery and conflict management, emergency first aid (including trauma first aid), amongst other security and defence related training. This is then followed by a six-month probation period, where the officer will be assessed by their Operations Manager.

== Capabilities ==
=== Operation Riverbank ===
An operation in place to train and utilise MGS officers within UK Border Force in times of need.

=== Services ===
Access control

- Control of access and egress
- Visitor reception duties
- Traffic control
- Control of passes
- Searching vehicles and personnel
- Control and issues of keys

Patrols

- Security patrols of buildings and perimeters
- Dog patrols

Communication and monitoring

- CCTV monitoring
- Observation tower duties
- Alarm monitoring
- Liaison with other security providers

Emergency response

- Contribute to counter terror planning
- Contribute to emergency response

Specialist duties

- First aid
- Unit security officer
- Scanning of mail and baggage
- Helicopter marshalling

== Controversy ==
=== OMEC ===
In mid-2020, the Operational MGS Employment Contract (OMEC) was introduced to newly recruited officers, this contract stipulated that officers would earn on paper around £25,000, which is more than the existing contract offered. However, the OMEC contract reduces meal break time and requires more shifts (26 per year). Officers are also required to work a de facto 60-hour work week. In addition, officers can no longer claim weekend premiums, and current serving officers on the old MGS contract wishing to transfer or apply for promotion will be moved onto the OMEC contract. The MoD are currently not in a position to address the MGS officer's concerns regarding the dispute, which has led to officers in some areas taking industrial action.

=== Touch pass protocol ===
In August 2022, it was said that officers within the MGS at Devonport Dockyard may strike as the "touch pass protocol" was announced to be brought back after COVID-19 health and safety practices had suspended it. It is said to be due to health and safety concerns.

== Other organisations ==
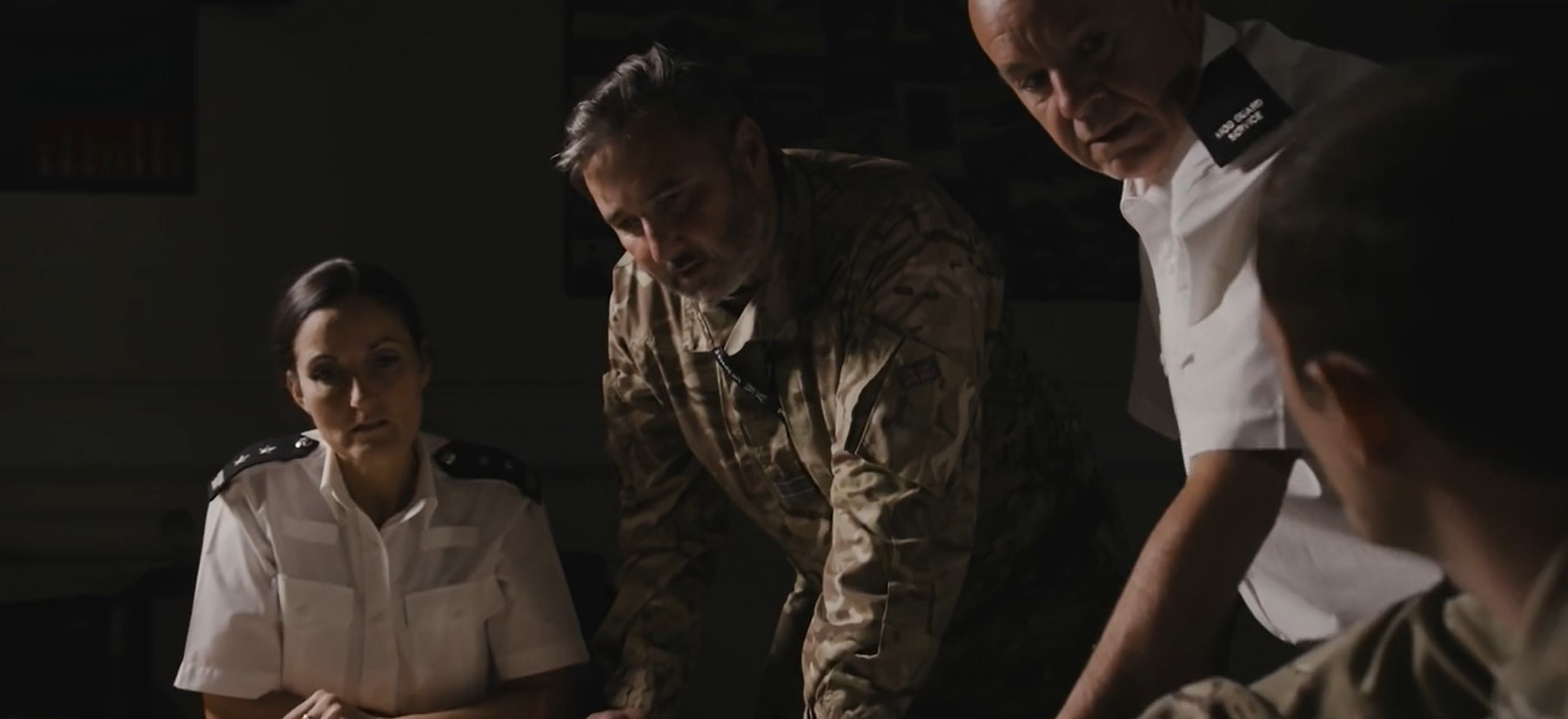
MGS Ops Manager and CSO5 discuss with an RAF Flt Lt. from UK Space Command.

The MGS works alongside armed guard services—the Military Provost Guard Service in England, Scotland, and Wales, and the Northern Ireland Security Guard Service (NISGS) in Northern Ireland. The Ministry of Defence Police (MDP) also work closely with the MGS, by providing an armed police service to the defence community and often act as the armed standoff or cover to the MGS whilst on guard.

The MGS also exists within Germany as the Germany Guard Service (GGS, previously CGSU (G)) similar to the aforementioned NISGS.

== See also ==
- Ministry of Defence Police
- Military Provost Guard Service
- Northern Ireland Security Guard Service
- Germany Guard Service
