= Military Provost Guard Service =

Armed guarding force within the British Army

- Cap Badge of the MPGS
- Country: United Kingdom
- Branch: British Army
- Role: Armed Guarding
- Motto: Custodem Custodire – Guarding the Guardians

Commanders
- Current commander: Provost Marshal (Army)
- Colonel of the Regiment: King Charles III

Insignia
- Tactical Recognition Flash

The Military Provost Guard Service (MPGS) is responsible for maintaining physical security at British Armed Forces locations throughout Great Britain. It is one of three constituent units of the Adjutant General's Corps Provost Branch (the other two parts being the Royal Military Police and the Military Provost Staff). The Provost branch is the responsibility of the Provost Marshal who is a Brigadier from the Royal Military Police. The MPGS also works alongside the unarmed Ministry of Defence Guard Service (MGS). In Northern Ireland, armed security at Ministry of Defence establishments is provided by the uniformed civilian Northern Ireland Security Guard Service in a similar manner to that of the MPGS in Great Britain.

== History and operational role ==
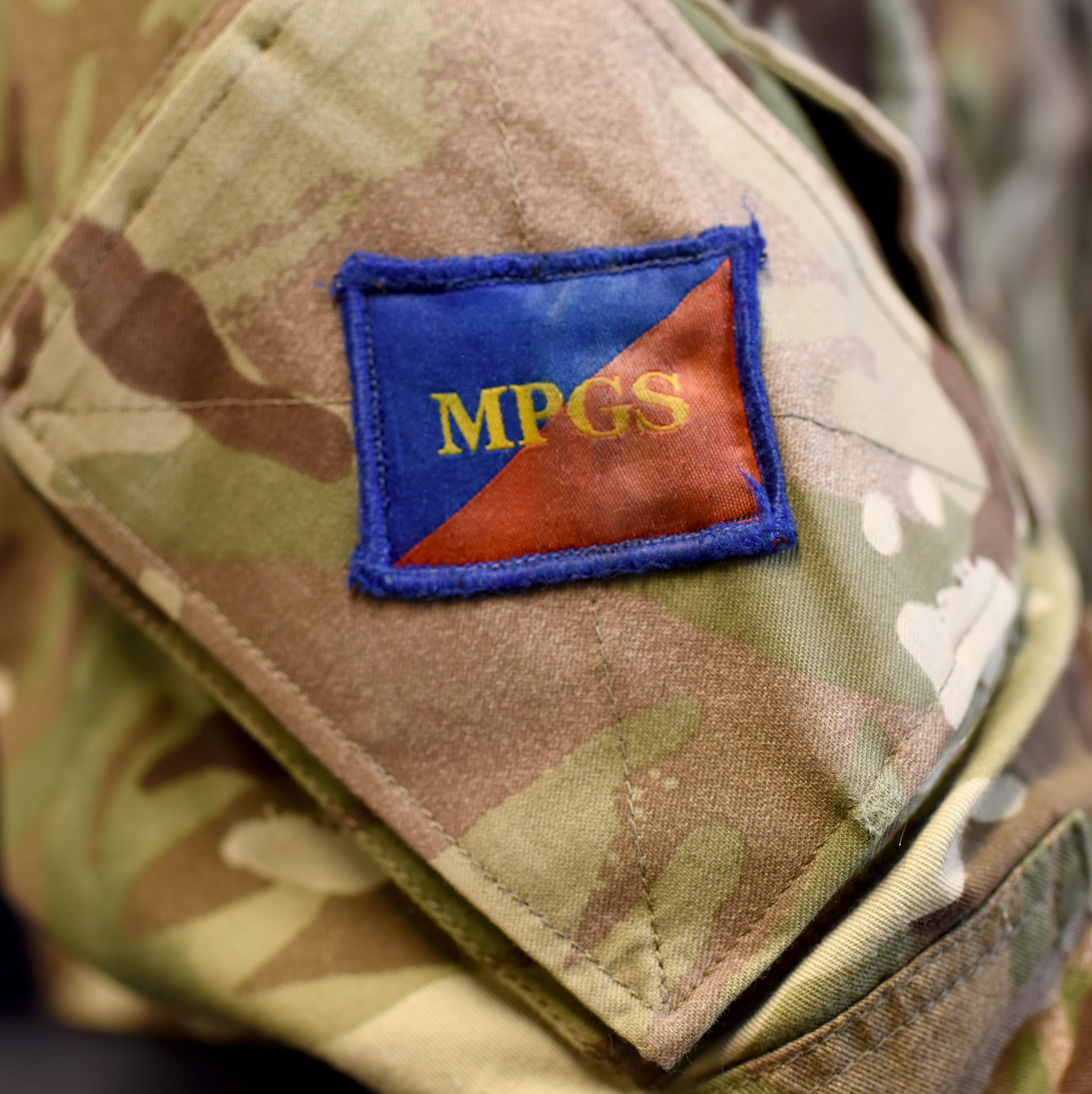
Tactical recognition flash of the MPGS

=== Duties ===
The MPGS was formed in the wake of structural changes of the Armed Forces and the increased threat of terrorism in 1997.

The MPGS's duties include:

- Controlling entry and exit access to a site
- Managing control room operations and ensuring all visitors are dealt with efficiently
- Patrolling site perimeters and taking necessary action to preserve perimeter security
- Security incident management, such as suspicious packages, bomb threats, protests, etc.
- Military Working Dog services at some sites.

=== Personnel ===
To join the MPGS, applicants must have served for at least three years in any arm or service, including the Royal Naval Reserve, Royal Marines Reserve, Army Reserve, and Royal Auxiliary Air Force. They must have completed that service within six years of application to the MPGS, unless they have relevant service in the Police or HM Prison Service since leaving the armed forces.

To join, they have to re-enlist into the Regular British Army on a Military Local Service Engagement (MLSE). The MLSE is a form of engagement which is ideally suited to use by the MPGS. It is renewable on a three-yearly basis providing the soldier continues to meet the requirements and standards of the service, as well as there being a continued need for MPGS soldiers at that particular unit.

==== Training ====
All MPGS soldiers are trained at the Defence School of Police and Security (DSPS), part of the Defence College of Logistics, Policing and Administration (DCLPA).

Their training includes:

- Powers of arrest
- Powers of search
- Use of force
- Patrolling techniques
- Incident handling
- Notebook instruction
- Maintenance of Occurrence Books
- Maintenance of Security Registers
- Processing telephone calls
- Accounting for security equipment
- Weapons handling
- Marksmanship, including live firing
- Judgmental assessment.

=== Relationship with other agencies ===
There are 26 police constabularies that currently have a Memorandum of Understanding (MOU) with the Military Provost Guard Service in respect of the legal authority for carrying firearms on UK roads.

== Locations in the United Kingdom ==
The MPGS page of the British Army website publishes a map listing locations in the UK where MPGS provides security. There are:

- 14 Royal Navy/Royal Marines locations
- 84 British Army locations
- 23 Royal Air Force locations
- 8 Strategic Command locations

== Equipment ==
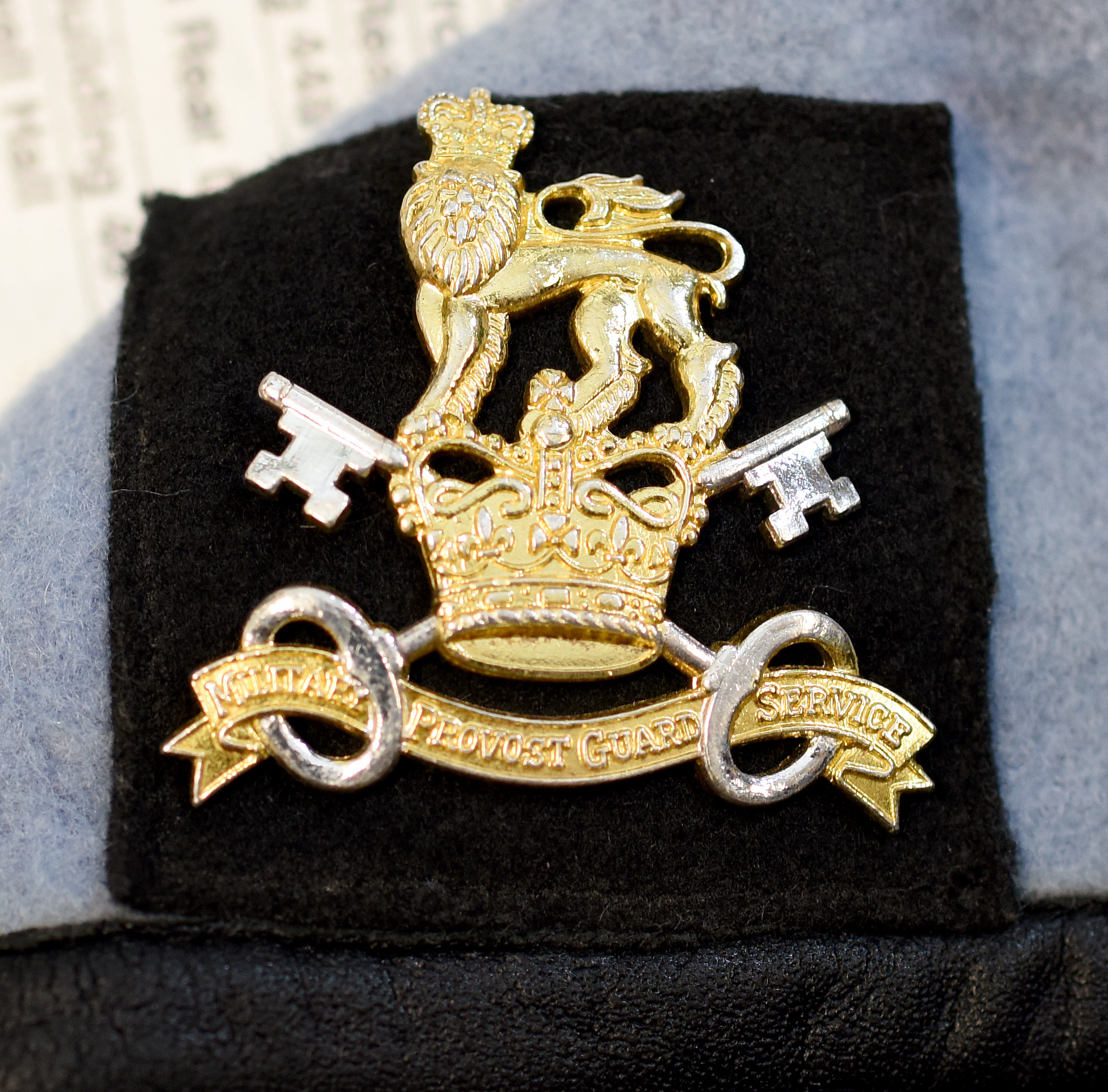
Beret badge

The main firearm used by the MPGS is the SA80 L85A2 assault rifle; Glock 9 mm semi-automatic pistols may also be used. All MPGS soldiers must pass a weapon handling test biannually to use firearms.

== Vehicles ==
Some vehicles have an amber strobe beacon on the roof for increased visibility. In late 2013, the Ministry of Defence purchased Ford Ranger pickups for use within the MPGS and other MOD departments.

== See also ==
- Military Police of the United Kingdom – military police units of the British Armed Forces
- Adjutant General's Corps – parent Corps of the MPGS
- Military Provost Staff Corps – similarly named specilaist detention and custody unit, the Army's equivalent of a prison service.
- Ministry of Defence Guard Service – unarmed civilian organisation providing security at British defence sites
- Northern Ireland Security Guard Service - armed civilian organisation fulfilling similar functions to MPGS
- Commandant's Service – organizations of the Soviet and Warsaw Pact armed forces that fulfilled similar functions
