= Germany Guard Service =

British Ministry of Defence security organisation

The Germany Guard Service (GGS) is a British Ministry of Defence security organisation that provides armed security to the British Armed Forces in Germany.

It was organised under agreements between the UK and German authorities, with the origins of the organisation dating as far back as the 1950s in the North Rhine-Westphalia and Lower Saxony areas.

The GGS directly supports the British Forces Germany garrison security mission.

== History ==
British Forces Germany (BFG) is the name for British Armed Forces service personnel and civilians based in Germany. It was first established following the Second World War as the British Army of the Rhine (BAOR). Although much smaller than the BAOR, it is still the largest concentration of British armed forces permanently stationed outside the United Kingdom. With the end of the Cold War and the Options for Change defence review in the early 1990s, BFG has been considerably reduced. Since the 1990s, the British presence has centred on the 1st Armoured Division, and supporting elements. BFG is concentrated in North Rhine-Westphalia and Lower Saxony.

== Concept ==
The concept of the GGS from the beginning was to employ local civilian volunteers in performing Armed security functions alongside British Forces. The GGS has been in service for decades, it is a civilian volunteer paramilitary security force (as defined under German laws), responsible for providing security of BFG garrisons in Germany.

Hiring of GGS personnel is the responsibility of the Garrison Labour Support Unit which supports all major UK Forces garrisons within Germany. All GGS personnel are subject to in-depth vetting and receive local clearance once hired.

== Training ==
The GGS receives formal training by MOD/Army and MOD Police force instructors. The initial three week qualification course is held at Sennelager, Paderborn (Westfalen Garrison).

This course prepares personnel for their duties by qualifying in knowledge of UK Army standard operating procedures regarding anti-terrorism measures, weapons qualification, communications, security procedures, use of force, self-defense techniques, access control, security systems monitoring, the GGS professional development program, driver qualifications, command structure and integration with Army security and Royal Military Police operations, as well as general orders, authority, and uniform in the garrison environment.

== Duties ==
GGS primary duties include access and badge control, vehicle searches, static security, roving foot and vehicle patrols, surveillance detection, CCTV and alarm systems monitoring, security checks, as well as acting as quasi interpreters by using their German language skills (required) when interacting with local contractors and authorities.

== Powers and Authority ==
The GGS is not a policing organisation and holds no police authority. However, they are integrated into the Army’s 24/7 armed security operation and may detain violators and use force measures appropriate to secure the garrison, up to and including deadly force when necessary.

== Uniform and Equipment ==
The GGS uniform is very similar to the other MOD security and Police uniforms. The uniform consists of royal blue or navy blue slacks with cargo pockets, black boots, a royal blue or dark blue blouse (supervisors may wear a white blouse) with shoulder markings, a dark blue beret with emblem, duty belt, a black tie for specific occasions, black gloves, service weapon, radio, baton, and ID badge.

The GGS does have a formal rank system that is based on His Majesty's Civil Service structure and rankings.

== Personnel ==
The majority of GGS volunteers are German nationals, but there has been diversity within the force that includes local expat employees (usually former military) including British, French, Dutch, and US personnel among the ranks.

== See also ==
- Northern Ireland Security Guard Service
- Ministry of Defence Guard Service
- Ministry of Defence Police
- Royal Military Police
