= Timeline of Continuity IRA actions =

This is a chronology of activities by the Continuity Irish Republican Army (CIRA), an Irish republican paramilitary group. The group started operations in 1994, after the Provisional Irish Republican Army began a ceasefire.

Note: All actions listed took place within Northern Ireland, unless stated otherwise.

== 1994 ==
- 19 December: The CIRA detonated a 2 lb (0.91 kg) semtex bomb in a furniture store in Enniskillen.

== 1995 ==
- 7 February: A small bomb was planted by the CIRA in a large general store in Newry.
- 16 March: A small bomb was planted by the CIRA in the same Newry shop premises as the February attack.
- 10 November: Gardaí intercepted 1,300 lb (590 kg) of explosives a mile from the County Armagh border they believed were destined for Northern Ireland and arrested two men.

== 1996 ==
- 6 January: The Irish Republican Publicity Bureau issued a statement saying "a reborn Irish Republican Army had emerged led by the 'Continuity Army Council'".
- 13 July: The CIRA claimed responsibility for exploding a 1,200 lb (540 kg) car bomb outside Killyhevlin Hotel in Enniskillen, County Fermanagh during a Catholic wedding reception. The blast caused serious damage and injured 17 people as they were being evacuated from the hotel.
- 29 September: The CIRA claimed responsibility for abandoning a 250 lb (110 kg) car bomb in Belfast. Security forces made the device safe using a controlled explosion.
- 21 November: The CIRA claimed responsibility for planting a 600 lb bomb in Derry. It failed to explode and was defused by the security forces.

== 1997 ==
- 27 January: The CIRA claimed responsibility for a suspect device found in Abbey Street in Derry. It was neutralised in two controlled explosions by the British Army.
- 6 July: The CIRA claimed responsibility for a gun and grenade attack on New Barnsley RUC station, west Belfast, as part of the widespread violence that followed Secretary of State Mo Mowlam's decision over the Drumcree parade. See: 1997 nationalist riots in Northern Ireland.
- 6 July: The CIRA claimed responsibility for a gun attack on RUC officers in the Oldpark Road-Cliftonville area of Belfast.
- 6 July: The CIRA claimed responsibility for shots fired on the Stewartstown Road in the Andersonstwown area of Belfast.
- 7 July: The CIRA claimed responsibility for a booby-trap bomb targeting British security forces left in Edenderry on the outskirts of Belfast. The RUC reported the device was a hoax.
- 31 July: The CIRA planted a bomb (estimated at between 500 lb (230 kg) and 1,000 lb (450 kg)) in the grounds of Carrybridge Hotel near Lisbellaw, County Fermanagh. It was defused by the British Army.
- 9 August: The CIRA planted a hoax van bomb on Craigavon Bridge in Derry, shortly before the start of the Apprentice Boys' parade through the city. Disturbances broke out during the march when loyalist bandsmen broke ranks to attack nationalist residents who were watching the parade.
- 16 September: The CIRA claimed responsibility for exploding a 400 lb (180 kg) van bomb outside the Royal Ulster Constabulary (RUC) base in Markethill, County Armagh. The bombing happened a day after Sinn Féin joined the political negotiations which led to the Good Friday Agreement.
- 16 October: the CIRA claimed responsibility for a hoax bomb scare at a public meeting addressed by Unionist politicians Peter Robinson, Robert McCartney, and Nelson McCausland.
- 30 October: The CIRA claimed responsibility for planting a holdall bomb in an office of a government building in Derry. The bag contained a quantity of Semtex and petrol, but failed to detonate properly.
- 30 October: the CIRA claimed a 500 lb (230 kg) bomb targeting a British Army patrol failed to detonate in Armagh city. Following widespread disruption and several controlled explosions the British Army assessed the claim was a hoax.
- 20 November: The CIRA planted a small bomb behind Belfast City Hall. The Progressive Unionist Party claimed the device was aimed at their ground floor office.

== 1998 ==
Note: for some of the incidents in 1998, it is unclear whether the Continuity IRA, the Real IRA, or both organizations were responsible:

- 6 January: A 500 lb (230 kg) car bomb was defused by the security forces in the centre of Banbridge, County Down. A telephoned warning had been sent.
- 24 January: Following a telephoned warning, a car bomb exploded outside the 'River Club' on Factory Road in Enniskillen, County Fermanagh. The building was extensively damaged, but there were no injuries. It is believed the CIRA was responsible.
- 20 February: Following a telephoned warning, a 500 lb (230 kg) car bomb exploded outside the RUC base in Moira, County Down. Seven RUC officers and four civilians were hurt. The blast caused widespread damage.
- 23 February: Following a telephoned warning, a 300 lb (140 kg) car bomb exploded near the RUC base on Edward Street in Portadown, County Armagh. The blast caused widespread damage but no injuries.
- 20 March: A bomb was left in the Northern Bank on Guildhall Square, Derry, and the area was cleared for four hours while the British Army defused it. The CIRA claimed responsibility and said a Republican had tried to stop the CIRA members from planting the bomb.
- 4 May: There was an attempted mortar attack on Grosvenor Road RUC base in Belfast. One of the mortars fell short of the target and the other exploded in its launch tube.
- 9 May: There was a mortar attack on the RUC base in Belleek, County Fermanagh. The mortars fell short of their target and one exploded as the RUC was clearing the area. There were no injuries.
- 15 May: A car and trailer bomb were abandoned in Kinawley, County Fermanagh. The British Army recovered and made safe two mortars, containing between 100 lb (45 kg) and 150 lb (68 kg) of explosives. It is believed the CIRA was responsible.

== 1999 ==
- 14 January: There was a gun attack on Woodbourne RUC base in Belfast. Four men were later arrested. It is believed the CIRA was responsible.
- 4 February: Channel 4 documentary Dispatches showed a CIRA propaganda video, which included members armed with a hand-held grenade launcher, an AK-47 assault rifle and a Magnum revolver.
- 4 May: There was a gun attack on Lisnaskea RUC base in County Fermanagh. It is believed the CIRA was responsible.
- 1 June: A telephone warning using a recognised CIRA codeword claimed a 500 lb (230 kg) bomb had been left in Russell Street, Armagh. The RUC searched the area disrupting rush hour traffic, but no bomb was found.
- 27 December: Approximately 20,000 people were evacuated from Kempton Park Racecourse following a bomb alert. The CIRA was blamed.

== 2000 ==
- 6 February: The CIRA claimed responsibility for detonating a bomb at Mahon's Hotel in Irvinestown, County Fermanagh. A telephoned warning was sent and the hotel was evacuated beforehand.
- 25 February: The CIRA claimed responsibility for a bomb attack on Shackleton British Army Barracks in Ballykelly, County Londonderry, which caused slight damage but no injuries. Three gas cylinders packed with explosives found at the scene failed to detonate.
- 10 May: The CIRA issued a statement calling on the Provisional IRA to disband and hand its weapons over to those who were "prepared to defend the Republic".
- 19 May: A series of bomb alerts caused serious disruption in Belfast. Telephoned warnings, allegedly from the CIRA, claimed bombs had been left in several locations including the BBC studios at Broadcasting House. British Army bomb disposal experts carried out several controlled explosions before declaring the area safe.
- 31 October: The CIRA claimed responsibility for planting a pipe bomb outside Castlewellan RUC base in County Down. It was hidden under a traffic cone and badly injured an RUC officer.
- 17 December: The CIRA was believed to have been responsible for leaving a booby-trap pipe bomb on a mountain road in Kilcoo, County Down. A telephoned warning was sent and the bomb was defused by security forces.

== 2001 ==
- 19 July: A bomb was thrown from a car and up to six shots fired during an attack on Castlewellan RUC base in County Down. The station suffered minor damage but there were no injuries.
- 2 August: Former Social Democratic and Labour Party (SDLP) MLA Eamonn O'Neill's family car was daubed with CIRA slogans in Castlewellan, County Down after O'Neill criticised a CIRA attack on the village's RUC base several weeks previously.
- 30 October: Two gunmen, claiming to be from the CIRA, hijacked a bus in Belfast and ordered the driver to drive to Woodbourne RUC base. The men fled leaving a holdall estimated to contain 5 kg of explosives. The security forces tried to defuse the bomb but it exploded during the operation. Damage was restricted to the bus and the gates of the base, and there were no injuries.
- 16 December: The CIRA claimed responsibility for exploding a small bomb outside a Customs and Excise office on the Killyhevlin Industrial Estate in County Fermanagh. A telephoned warning had been sent. The office was unmanned at the time and there were no injuries.

== 2002 ==
- 21 January: The CIRA was linked to a gun attack in a pub in Ardglass, County Down. Two masked gunmen entered the pub and fired shots into the ceiling before leaving. It was claimed that they were searching for a leading member of a rival republican group, intent on killing him.
- 9 April: The CIRA claimed responsibility for a car that was found abandoned by police with maps and empty fertiliser bags.
- 17 April: The CIRA claimed responsibility for exploding a bomb at a police training college in Belfast. The blast damaged gates and fencing.
- 22 April: police intercepted a van bomb in Belfast they believed was to be used in attack on the headquarters of the Ulster Unionist Party. The CIRA was blamed.
- 24 July: The CIRA claimed responsibility for exploding a bomb on the estate of Unionist peer Alan Brooke. A small crater was found after a three-day search of the 1,000-acre (4.0 km^{2}) estate at Brookeborough, County Fermanagh.
- 2 September: The CIRA was blamed for a gun attack on PSNI and British Army personnel in Downpatrick, County Down. Up to five shots were fired as they searched houses in the Model Farm Estate. Nobody was injured.
- 25 October: The CIRA was blamed for leaving a van bomb near Windsor House in Belfast. A telephone warning was sent. Witnesses reported a muffled explosion came from the van shortly before the arrival of bomb disposal experts, who then carried out a controlled explosion.

== 2003 ==
- 8 January: The CIRA claimed responsibility for planting a large firebomb at a waterworks on Castleblayney Road in Keady, County Armagh. A telephone warning was sent and the bomb was defused by security forces.
- 13 January: The CIRA claimed responsibility for planting a firebomb outside a supermarket in Dungannon, County Tyrone. It was made safe by security forces.
- 2 February: The CIRA claimed responsibility for exploding a bomb at the perimeter fence of a Territorial Army base in south Belfast. Another bomb attached to the fence was defused by security forces.
- 7 February: The CIRA claimed responsibility for leaving a car bomb on Blacks Road, Belfast. The M1 motorway was closed while security forces made it safe.
- 10 February: The CIRA claimed responsibility for exploding a small bomb at the back of the town hall in Enniskillen, County Fermanagh. A telephone warning was sent. Three PSNI officers were hurt.
- 18 February: The CIRA claimed responsibility for throwing two nail bombs over the perimeter fence of Antrim Road PSNI base in north Belfast. One exploded, causing minor damage, and the other was defused.
- 19 February: A pipe bomb was found on the roof of Woodbourne PSNI base in Belfast. It was unclear when the device was thrown. The CIRA claimed responsibility.
- 7 May: The CIRA claimed responsibility for throwing a coffee jar bomb at a PSNI patrol car in Armagh. It failed to explode.
- 14 October: The CIRA claimed responsibility for planting an incendiary car bomb outside the PSNI base on York Road, Belfast. It was made safe by security forces.
- 24 November: The CIRA claimed responsibility for exploding a bomb outside a British Army base in Dungannon, County Tyrone. A telephone warning was sent. Two PSNI officers were hurt while trying to clear the area.

== 2004 ==
- 14 June: The CIRA was blamed for exploding a 50 lb (23 kg) bomb at a golf clubhouse in Lurgan, County Armagh. The golf club was closed at the time and the bomb caused minor damage.
- 15 September: A suspect car was found in New Lodge, Belfast following a telephone warning from the CIRA. The security forces carried out controlled explosions on the car.

== 2005 ==
- 1 January: The CIRA claimed responsibility for an attempted firebomb attack on Grosvenor Road PSNI base in Belfast. Two gunmen forced a taxi driver to drive the bomb to the base. It was made safe by security forces.
- 20 January: The CIRA was believed to have been responsible for planting a pipe bomb under a van at Belcamp Crescent, Dublin. It was made safe by security forces. Two men were arrested nearby.
- 5 July: A telephone caller, claiming to be from the CIRA, said a bomb had been thrown at a PSNI vehicle the day before in Keady, County Armagh. Security forces examined a suspicious device on Kinelowen Street, but later declared it was an elaborate hoax.
- 12 July: The CIRA was blamed for attacking PSNI officers with blast bombs during rioting in the Ardoyne area of north Belfast, following an Orange Order parade. Eighty officers were injured, one seriously, and several people were arrested.
- 6 November: In a telephoned warning, the CIRA claimed responsibility for planting a hoax bomb during the Down Royal horse racing festival. The festival was abandoned.
- 8 December: A suspected CIRA member was arrested while driving a bomb through Dublin. Gardaí believe the device was intended for use against drugs gangs in the city. The man, Martin O'Rourke, was subsequently sentenced to seven years imprisonment for possession of an explosive device.
- 26 December: The CIRA again sent a hoax bomb alert to a horse race at Down Royal. The site was evacuated but nothing was found.

== 2006 ==
- 9 November: The CIRA was believed to be responsible for firing shots at a PSNI base in Keady, County Armagh.
- 7 December: The CIRA was believed to be responsible for planting a pipe bomb outside a PSNI base in Lurgan, County Armagh. It failed to explode.

== 2007 ==
- 12 March: The CIRA shot dead two of its former members in response to the establishment of a rival group.
- 11 November: The IMC blamed the CIRA for a coffee jar bomb during a British Army Remembrance Day service in Newry. The explosives were detonated inside the barrel of a ceremonial cannon during the traditional 11 am silence. No one was injured and Army technical officers who examined the cannon thought it was a jar containing fireworks.

== 2008 ==
- 2 January: A CIRA unit fired a volley of shots over the grave of ex-RSF Patron Dan Keating at Kiltallagh Cemetery on what would have been his 106th birthday.
- 13 February: The IMC said the CIRA was responsible for orchestrating rioting and public disorder in Newry and Craigavon, during which PSNI officers came under attack from youths armed with bricks, bottles, stones and paintbombs.
- 14 June: The CIRA claimed responsibility for an attempted a landmine attack on a PSNI patrol-car in Rosslea, County Fermanagh. The landmine partially exploded as the car passed, injuring two officers.
- 19 July: The CIRA threatened to shoot civil servants from Northern Ireland's Driver & Vehicle Agency for co-operating with the PSNI.
- 16 August: The CIRA claimed responsibility for firing a rocket-propelled grenade at a PSNI patrol in Lisnaskea, County Fermanagh. It partially exploded, lightly hurting three officers. Police believed the weapon formerly belonged to the PIRA and that it malfunctioned because it hadn't been stored in good conditions.
- 25-26 August: The IMC blamed the CIRA for orchestrating civil disturbances, hijackings and rioting in Craigavon, County Armagh. It said that it believed the CIRA tried to lure police officers into positions where they could be attacked. A number of shots were fired during the disturbances.
- 4 October: The IMC blamed the CIRA for a roadside bomb near Newtownbutler, County Fermanagh.
- 5 November: The CIRA claimed responsibility for a blast-bomb attack against Lurgan PSNI base. There were no injuries.
- 26 November: The CIRA issued threats against community workers who co-operate with the PSNI in north Belfast.

== 2009 ==
- 14 January: The CIRA claimed responsibility for destroying a JCB digger at Casement Park, Belfast. It was destroyed after the contractor refused to pay protection money to the group.
- 29 January: The IMC blamed the CIRA for an armed robbery in Dungannon, County Tyrone.
- 10 February: The CIRA is believed to have been responsible for leaving three pipe bombs on Shiels Street, off the Falls Road in Belfast. They were made safe by the British Army.
- 10 February: The IMC blamed the CIRA for a hoax bomb alert in Armagh town.
- 3 March: The CIRA was blamed for the discovery of pipe bombs at a house in the Phibsborough, Dublin.
- 9 March: The CIRA claimed responsibility for shooting dead a Catholic PSNI (formerly RUC) officer in Craigavon. The officer, Stephen Paul Carroll, was shot by a sniper as he and a colleague investigated a complaint of broken windows in a nearby home. This was the first police fatality in Northern Ireland since 1998. Brendan McConville, a former PIRA volunteer, and John Paul Wootton, a teenager at the time of Carroll's murder, were convicted. McConville received 25 years and Wootton's sentence was initially 14 years (later raised to 18 years). Wootton received a lesser sentence as he was 17 years old at the time of Carroll's murder, and his role was deemed by the judges to have been "peripheral". Wootton's mother and Carroll's widow, on opposite sides, both condemned the sentences, as, respectively, unfairly long, and unduly short.
- 15 June: The CIRA claimed responsibility for a failed bomb attack against the PSNI base in Armagh town. A bomb was thrown at the base but failed to detonate properly.
- 13 July: An armed CIRA member appeared at a riot in Armagh town.
- 21 September: The IMC claimed the CIRA was responsible for the armed robbery of a bank in Belleek, County Donegal.
- 12 October: The IMC blamed the CIRA for the punishment shooting of a man in his home in Belfast.
- 20 November: The CIRA claimed responsibility for shooting a man three-times in the leg in a punishment attack in Belfast.
- 23 December: The IMC blamed the CIRA for the punishment shooting of a man in Belfast. The man had been convicted for a role in the death of a shopkeeper two years earlier.

== 2010 ==
- 7 January: The IMC blamed the CIRA for the punishment shooting of a man in Armagh.
- 18 January: The IMC blamed the CIRA for the punishment shooting of a man in Lurgan.
- 4 April: Sixteen CIRA prisoners along with other republican prisoners barricaded themselves in the dining hall of Maghaberry Prison. The protest was in response to conditions in the prison. The stand-off ended after two days, when prison staff raided the room.
- 5 April: The CIRA claimed responsibility for a failed car bomb attack on Crossmaglen PSNI base. A telephoned warning was given and the bomb was made safe by the British Army.
- 13 April: The CIRA claimed responsibility for a failed car bomb attack on Newtownhamilton PSNI base. A telephoned warning was given and the bomb was made safe by the British Army.
- 4 May: The IMC blamed the CIRA for exploding a pipe bomb outside Lurgan PSNI base. The base was unscathed but a nearby building was damaged.
- 17 May: The CIRA were blamed for orchestrating rioting in Lurgan. Two blast bombs and several petrol bombs were thrown at PSNI officers. Six officers suffered minor injuries.
- 31 May: The CIRA were blamed for shooting a man in the leg at Juniper Park, Belfast.
- 9 June: It was reported that an "unauthorised" meeting was held by disgruntled CIRA members who were allegedly seeking to set up a breakaway paramilitary group and carry out more military action. Some disgruntled members also allegedly tried to seize the offices of Republican Sinn Féin and its newspaper, Saoirse. In a statement, the CIRA leadership said that it expelled or suspended those involved.
- 16 June: The CIRA claimed responsibility for a bomb that partially exploded outside a house in the Finglas area of Dublin.
- 18 June: The IMC blamed the CIRA for shooting a man in the chest in west Befast. The man was shot as he tried to run away from three masked men.
- 11 July: The CIRA was blamed for orchestrating rioting in the Broadway area of Belfast in the run-up to the 12th of July Orange Order marches. A PSNI officer was badly wounded by shotgun fire, which was also blamed on the CIRA.
- 13 July: The IMC blamed the CIRA for firing shots at PSNI officers during rioting in Belfast.
- 22 July: The IMC blamed the CIRA for a pipe bomb attack on Woodbourne PSNI base in Belfast.
- 28 July: The IMC blamed the CIRA for the kidnapping and punishment shooting of a man in Belfast.
- 28 July: In an interview with the Irish Times, members of a "militant Northern-based faction within the CIRA" claimed to have overthrown the leadership of the organization. They also claimed that an Army Convention representing "95 per cent of volunteers" had unanimously elected a new 12-member Army Executive, which in turn appointed a new seven-member Army Council. The moves came as a result of dissatisfication with the southern-based leadership and the apparent winding-down of military operations. A senior source from Republican Sinn Féin said: "We would see them [the purported new leadership] as just another splinter group that has broken away."
- 2 August: The CIRA was blamed for a blast bomb attack on Craigavon PSNI base.
- 14 August: The IMC blamed the CIRA for a bomb attack that injured three children in Lurgan. The PSNI received a warning that a bomb had been left in the grounds of Lurgan Model Primary School. This device was found to be a hoax. Shortly after, a bomb exploded inside a bin on North Street, where the PSNI had set up a cordon. Three children (two aged 12 and one aged two), who were walking past at the time, were injured by debris, suffering cuts and shock.
- 24 August: The IMC blamed the CIRA for an attempted pipe bomb attack on Woodbourne PSNI base in Belfast. The device failed to explode.
- 11 September: The CIRA claimed responsibility for the punishment shootings of two men in the Ardoyne area of north Belfast.
- 29 September: A CIRA firing party fired a volley of shots over the grave of veteran republican Paul Stanley in Straffan, County Kildare.
- 17 November: The CIRA ordered a man to leave the country within a week or face being killed, this came after a CIRA attack on the man in Tallaght, Dublin.

== 2011 ==
- 16 March: The CIRA was blamed for the punishment beating of a heroin dealer in Clondalkin, Dublin.
- 6 July: The CIRA were blamed for hijacking vehicles and firing shots at a police patrol during disturbances in Craigavon. The trouble started after Republican Sinn Féin president Des Dalton was arrested during a public meeting.
- 17 September: The CIRA claimed responsibility for firing a rocket-propelled grenade at a PSNI vehicle in Craigavon. The alleged attack happened on Lake Road, between roundabouts one and two of Craigavon, shortly after midnight. There were no reports of any casualties in the alleged attack.

== 2012 ==
- 26 July: The Continuity IRA released a statement claiming that a new leadership (Army Council) had been elected after they had expelled members who were allegedly acting to the detriment of the group. The statement also said anyone acting in a criminal manner using the name of the CIRA would be subject to "military action."

== 2013 ==
- 25 January: The CIRA claimed responsibility for firing shots at the PSNI in the Drumbeg estate in Craigavon.
- 30 March 2013: A small bomb exploded near PSNI Land Rovers in the Kilwilkie area of Lurgan. It had been hidden in a bin. The PSNI were monitoring an unnotified march that included masked CIRA members.
- 6 April: The CIRA claimed responsibility for shooting dead a former member in West Belfast. Kieran McManus was killed by a masked man wielding a shotgun. The CIRA claimed he was killed for "terrorising his community with knives, hatchets and swords". In a telephone statement the Northern command of the CIRA claimed it was prepared to kill former members if they engaged in anti-social behaviour and criminal activity using the Continuity IRA's name.

== 2014 ==
- 14 March: The CIRA claimed responsibility for planting a booby-trap bomb under a PSNI officer's car in Belfast. The bomb was found after it fell off the car on Blacks Road. The CIRA added that it "has had a complete reorganization […] and is now in a position to sustain and carry out attacks on occupational forces throughout Ireland".
- April: The CIRA released a statement threatening Limerick republicans.

It has come to our attention that members of the Alan Ryan gang are now working with a Limerick gang styling itself Continuity IRA, which threatened Dublin criminals. We will be pursuing the extortionists no matter where they try and hide themselves. We want no more excuses — you have five working days to hand the extortionists over to us or face the inevitable consequences. There will be no intimidation by the Limerick gang.

- April: The group is believed to be responsible for the killing of a former member of the organization, Tommy Crossan. Sinn Féin MEP Martina Anderson criticised the killing saying those responsible are "criminals masquerading as republicans"

== 2015 ==
- 18 February: It was announced that MI5 had uncovered a plot to assassinate Martin McGuinness using a rocket. The plot was only considered and not imminent.

== 2016 ==
- February: Following the killing of criminal David Byrne in the Regency Hotel, Dublin, a group claiming to be the Continuity IRA claimed responsibility for the killing. Later another statement was issued under the name of the Continuity IRA denying involvement, saying the previous statement was an "attempt to tarnish the name of the organisation".
- Easter: At Easter the Continuity IRA marched in paramilitary uniforms through north Lurgan, County Armagh, without hindrance from the PSNI who monitored the parade from a police helicopter.

== 2017 ==
- In June 2017, the Irish newspaper Limerick Leader reported on a press release by a Limerick-based faction of the Continuity IRA in which it was said that the group would disband. The group claimed that after consulting with its members in the "32 counties", the decision was made to end their "futile war" and to decommission the few weapons and explosives still in their possession over the next few months.

== 2018 ==
- In January the CIRA claimed it would not commit to a ceasefire, as did the ONH.
- 18 December: the CIRA was behind an attempted attack on the PSNI in the Dunmurry area of Belfast.

== 2019 ==
- In April the CIRA fired a volley of shots at an Easter commemoration in Carrickmore County Tyrone.
- 26 July: The Continuity IRA is said to be responsible for an attempted horizontal mortar attack on the PSNI on the Tullygally road area in Craigavon, the mortar bomb missed its target.
- 19 August: A bomb attack targeting PSNI officers and army bomb experts in Wattlebridge, County Fermanagh, is understood to have been carried out by the Continuity IRA. Police and army were dealing with a hoax device that was placed on the side of a road when the real device exploded yards away, there were no reports of any injuries.
- 4 December: The Continuity IRA carried out a grenade attack against the PSNI in West Belfast. In a statement to the Irish News which came with a recognised codeword, the Continuity IRA last night said the attack was carried out by “volunteers of the Irish Republican Army acting under orders of the Continuity Army Council, One of our units in Belfast carried out the attack using a military hand grenade.”

== 2020 ==
- 31 January: The Continuity IRA was responsible for planting a bomb on a lorry in Lurgan due to explode on the day the United Kingdom left the EU. The "Brexit Day bomb plot" was intended to occur on 31 January 2020 coinciding with the Brexit withdrawal. The Police Service of Northern Ireland (PSNI) was given two anonymous tips that a bomb inside a lorry would be on a ferry heading from Belfast Harbour to Cairnryan, Scotland. A search at Belfast Harbour failed to find a device. On 5 February 2020, the bomb was found inside a lorry on the Silverwood Industrial Estate in Lurgan, County Armagh, Northern Ireland, after searching 400 lorries. The device was made safe by a bomb disposal team. As of February 2020, the PSNI were investigating the incident and believed the Continuity Irish Republican Army (CIRA) was responsible for the failed plot.
- 16–17 May: The Continuity IRA carried out a foot patrol near Wattle Bridge, County Fermanagh, before firing shots in a nearby graveyard. In a statement to the Irish News, the organisation says it has been recruiting and regrouping in the Fermanagh area and a statement with the pictures claimed it shows "the CIRA can operate at any time day or night in south Fermanagh".

== 2021 ==
- 14 January: The CIRA claimed responsibility for an alleged attack on a PSNI helicopter Wattlebridge in south Fermanagh. The PSNI issued a statement saying there was no evidence of an attack on a police aircraft and that the helicopter in question was likely a civilian helicopter. The CIRA statement also said they had been intending to ambush PSNI officers responding to a hoax bomb call in the area.
- 14 March: The CIRA claimed responsibility for a gun attack on the PSNI station in Enniskillen. Several shots were fired at the station from an improvised slam gun.
