= Massereene Barracks shooting =

2009 shooting in Northern Ireland

- Part of the dissident Irish republican campaign
- The soldiers receiving a pizza delivery vehicle just before the shooting

- Location: 54°43′18″N 6°13′51″W; Antrim, County Antrim, Northern Ireland, United Kingdom
- Date: 7 March 2009; ~23:40 (GMT)
- Target: Massereene Barracks
- Attack type: Ambush
- Weapon: AKM automatic rifle
- Deaths: 2 soldiers
- Injuries: 4 (2 soldiers, 2 civilians)
- Perpetrator: Real IRA

On 7 March 2009, two off-duty British soldiers of the 38 Engineer Regiment were shot dead outside Massereene Barracks in Antrim, Northern Ireland. Two other soldiers and two civilian delivery men were also wounded. A dissident Irish republican paramilitary group, the Real IRA, claimed responsibility.

The shootings were the first British military fatalities in Northern Ireland since 1997. Two days later the Continuity IRA shot dead Stephen Carroll, a Police Service of Northern Ireland (PSNI) officer; the first police officer to be killed by paramilitaries since 1998.

== Background ==
From the late 1960s until the late 1990s, Northern Ireland underwent a conflict known as the Troubles, in which more than 3,500 people were killed. More than 700 of those killed were British military personnel deployed as part of Operation Banner. Most of these personnel were killed by the Provisional Irish Republican Army (IRA), which waged an armed campaign to force the British to negotiate a withdrawal from Northern Ireland. In 1997, the IRA called a final ceasefire, and in 1998 the Good Friday Agreement was signed. This is widely seen as marking the end of the conflict.

Breakaway groups opposed to the ceasefire ("dissident Irish republicans") continued a low-level armed campaign against the British security forces in Northern Ireland (see Dissident Irish Republican campaign). The main group involved was an IRA splinter group known as the Real IRA. In 2007, the British Army formally ended Operation Banner and greatly reduced its presence in Northern Ireland.

The low-level campaign continued. In January 2009, security forces defused a bomb in Castlewellan, and in 2008 dissident republicans attempted to kill Police Service of Northern Ireland (PSNI) officers in Derry, Castlederg and Dungannon. In all three cases, PSNI officers were seriously wounded. Two of the attacks involved firearms, while the other involved an under-car booby-trap bomb.

== Shooting ==
At about 9.40 pm on Saturday, 7 March, four off-duty British soldiers of the Royal Engineers walked outside the barracks to receive a pizza delivery from two delivery men. As the exchange was taking place, two masked gunmen in a nearby car opened fire with PM md. 63 automatic rifles. The firing lasted for more than 30 seconds, with more than 60 shots being fired. After the initial burst, the gunmen walked over to the wounded soldiers and fired again at close range, killing two of them. Those killed were Sappers Mark Quinsey from Birmingham and Patrick Azimkar from London. The other two soldiers and the two deliverymen were wounded. The soldiers were wearing desert fatigues and were due to be deployed to Afghanistan the next day. A few hours later, the stolen car involved was found abandoned near Randalstown, eight miles (13 km) from the barracks.

The Sunday Tribune received a phone call from a caller using a recognised Real IRA codeword. The caller claimed responsibility for the attack on behalf of the Real IRA, adding that the civilian deliverymen were legitimate targets as they were "collaborating with the British by servicing them".

These were the first British military fatalities in Northern Ireland since Lance Bombardier Stephen Restorick was shot dead by the Provisional IRA in February 1997, during the Troubles. The attack came days after a suggestion by Northern Ireland's police chief, Sir Hugh Orde, that the likelihood of a "terrorist" attack in Northern Ireland was at its highest level for several years.

Civilian security officers belonging to the Northern Ireland Security Guard Service were criticised for not opening fire during the incident, after which plans were made to retrain and rearm them.

The barracks were shut down in 2010 as part of the reduction of the British Army presence in Northern Ireland.

=== Craigavon shooting ===
Two days after the Massereene Barracks shooting, PSNI officer Stephen Carroll was shot dead in Craigavon, County Armagh. This was the first killing of a police officer in Northern Ireland since 1998. The Continuity IRA claimed responsibility and stated that "As long as there is British involvement in Ireland, these attacks will continue".

== Reaction ==
The morning after the attack, worshippers came out of St Comgall's Church after mass and kept vigil near the barracks. They were joined by their priest and clerics from the town's other churches. On 11 March 2009, thousands of people attended silent protests against the killings at several venues in Northern Ireland.

The killings were condemned by all mainstream political parties in Northern Ireland, as well as the Irish government, the United States government and Pope Benedict XVI. Sinn Féin condemned the killings, but was criticised for being less vehement than others in its condemnation.

First Minister Peter Robinson said the shooting was a "terrible reminder of the events of the past" and that "These murders were a futile act by those who command no public support and have no prospect of success in their campaign. It will not succeed".

Deputy First Minister Martin McGuinness said "I was a member of the IRA, but that war is over now. The people responsible for last night's incident are clearly signalling that they want to resume or restart that war. Well, I deny their right to do that." He later stated that the shooters of the PSNI officer killed two days later were "traitors to the island of Ireland".

Sinn Féin President Gerry Adams condemned the shootings, saying that those responsible had "no support, no strategy to achieve a United Ireland. Their intention is to bring British soldiers back onto the streets. They want to destroy the progress of recent times and to plunge Ireland back into conflict. Irish republicans and democrats have a duty to oppose this and to defend the peace process".

British Prime Minister Gordon Brown visited the scene of the attack on 9 March and met political leaders in Northern Ireland. He said "The whole country is shocked and outraged at the evil and cowardly attacks on soldiers serving their country" and also that "No murderer will be able to derail a peace process that has the support of the great majority of Northern Ireland".

Taoiseach Brian Cowen said "A tiny group of evil people can not and will not undermine the will of the people of Ireland to live in peace together. Violence has been utterly rejected by the people of this island, both North and South".

At a press conference on 25 March, Richard Walsh, spokesman for Republican Sinn Féin, a party linked to the Continuity IRA, said the killings were "an act of war" rather than murder. "We have always upheld the right of the Irish people to use any level of controlled and disciplined force to drive the British out of Ireland. We make no apology for that". He also described the PSNI as "an armed adjunct of the British Army".

== Trials ==
On 14 March, the PSNI arrested three men in connection with the killings, one of whom was former IRA prisoner Colin Duffy. He had broken away from mainstream republicanism and criticised Sinn Féin's decision to back the new PSNI. On 25 March, after a judicial review of their detention, all three men were ordered to be released by the Belfast High Court; Duffy was immediately re-arrested on suspicion of murder. On 26 March, Duffy was charged with the murder of the two soldiers and the attempted murder of five other people. The following day he appeared in court and was remanded in custody after it was alleged that his full DNA profile was found on a latex glove inside the vehicle used by the gunmen, and that soil from a hold‑all in the vehicle was reported to match soil taken from his boot.

Brian Shivers, a cystic fibrosis sufferer, was charged with the soldiers' murders and the attempted murder of six other people. He was also charged with possession of firearms and ammunition with intent to endanger life. He was arrested in Magherafelt in July 2009.

In January 2012, Shivers was convicted of the soldiers' murders, but Duffy was acquitted. In January 2013, Shivers's conviction was overturned by Northern Ireland's highest appeals court. A May 2013 retrial found him not guilty. He was cleared of all charges and released. The judge questioned why the Real IRA would choose Shivers as the gunman, given his cystic fibrosis and his engagement to a Protestant woman.

Shivers's solicitor stated:

Brian Shivers has suffered the horror of having been wrongfully convicted in what now must be described as a miscarriage of justice. He was convicted of the most serious charges on the criminal calendar. He was sentenced to a life term imprisonment, which would have seen him die in prison. The original conviction was overturned on a narrow legal basis. It was only during his re-trial that important new material was disclosed which completely undermined the case against him. This failed prosecution – another failed prosecution – is a cautionary tale against the reliance upon tenuous scientific evidence in high profile criminal cases.

== See also ==
- Timeline of Real Irish Republican Army actions
- Timeline of the Northern Ireland Troubles and peace process
