= Murder of Stephen Carroll =

2009 murder case in the United Kingdom

- Part of the dissident Irish republican campaign
- Location: Lismore Manor, Craigavon, County Armagh, Northern Ireland, United Kingdom
- Date: 9 March 2009; 9:45 pm
- Attack type: Ambush
- Weapon: AK-47
- Deaths: 1
- Injuries: None
- Perpetrator: Continuity IRA
- Verdict: Guilty
- Convicted: 2

On 9 March 2009, Stephen Carroll, a 48‑year‑old Police Service of Northern Ireland (PSNI) officer, was killed by the Continuity IRA in Craigavon, County Armagh. His death was the first killing of a serving police officer since the Good Friday Agreement in 1998.

Two days earlier, the Real IRA had fatally shot two British soldiers in Massereene, marking an escalation in attacks by dissident republicans.

== Background ==
Stephen Carroll, aged 48, was born in the Republic of Ireland and was raised in England. He had lived in County Kildare and in Epping, Essex, and later lived in Banbridge, Co Down, Northern Ireland. He was married and had a stepson. Carroll joined the RUC and later the PSNI, and had served for 24 years at the time of his death. He had intended to retire in 2010 and work as a personal trainer. Two days before Carroll's murder, two British soldiers had been shot and killed outside Massereene Barracks.

== Murder and aftermath ==
On 9 March 2009, Carroll and other PSNI officers responded to a call at Lismore Manor in Craigavon after a brick was thrown through a window. The brick attack was used to draw police to the area. At about 9:45 pm, two police vehicles arrived. As the second vehicle turned into the cul‑de‑sac, gunfire struck it, and Carroll was shot in the head. The following day, the Continuity IRA claimed responsibility, saying its North Armagh Battalion carried out the attack and that "As long as there is British involvement in Ireland, these attacks will continue".

Carroll's funeral took place on 13 March 2009 at St Therese Church in Banbridge. His stepson, Shane, died at his home on 5 May 2020, aged 48, and was buried next to him. According to his mother, he had never got over the loss of his stepfather and experienced depression.

=== Convictions ===
In March 2012, Brendan McConville and John Wootton were convicted of Carroll's murder. McConville received a 25‑year sentence, while Wootton was given a minimum term of 14 years. Their appeals were dismissed in May 2014. Wootton's sentence was increased to 18 years in October 2014.

=== Reactions ===
Prime Minister Gordon Brown stated that "These are murderers who are trying to distort, disrupt and destroy a political process that is working for the people of Northern Ireland," Chief Constable Sir Hugh Orde called it a "sad day" and said the gunmen were "criminal psychopaths".

Deputy First Minister of Northern Ireland Martin McGuinness said those responsible were "traitors to the island of Ireland" and that "they have betrayed the political desires, hopes and aspirations of all of the people who live on this island."

McConville and Wooton have become known as the "Craigavon 2" among Irish Republicans and miscarriage‑of‑justice campaigners who claim their innocence.

== See also ==
- Killing of Ronan Kerr
- Killing of David Black
