= Massereene Barracks =

Former military installation, Antrim, Northern Ireland

- Antrim, Northern Ireland

Site information
- Type: Barracks
- Owner: Ministry of Defence
- Operator: British Army

Location
- Location within Northern Ireland
- Coordinates: 54.7216°N 6.2307°W

Site history
- Built: 1942
- In use: 1942-2010

Garrison information
- Occupants: 3rd Infantry Brigade

Massereene Barracks is a former military installation in Antrim, Northern Ireland.

== History ==
The site was acquired from Clotworthy Skeffington, 11th Viscount Massereene for a shooting range in 1893. In 1942, during the Second World War, the Admiralty commissioned a torpedo factory there such that Mark 8 torpedoes could be manufactured in the factory and then tested on Lough Neagh. After the War the site became the Royal Naval Armaments Depot Antrim. 33 Independent Field Squadron Royal Engineers arrived at the barracks in July 1974 and, after 33 Independent Field Squadron was absorbed into 25 Regiment Royal Engineers, that regiment took over the barracks in 1992.

The site was subsequently handed over to the Royal Marines and, from 1993, it was used as a base for the Royal Marine vessels Grey Wolf and Grey Fox which were deployed in counter terrorism and police operations on Lough Neagh and inshore waterways in Northern Ireland; the barracks were the subject of considerable further development in 1998.

The site then passed to the British Army and became the home of 38 Engineer Regiment in July 2008. On 7 March 2009, two off-duty British soldiers of the regiment were shot dead outside the barracks. Two other soldiers and two civilian delivery men were also shot and wounded during the mass shooting. A dissident Irish republican paramilitary group, the Real IRA, claimed responsibility. After 38 Engineer Regiment moved to RAF Aldergrove in 2010, the barracks were demolished and the site sold to Randox Laboratories in December 2013 for use as a science park.
