= Irish Republican Liberation Army =

Irish paramilitary "self-styled vigilante group" centered in Belfast

- Dates active: 2006–unknown
- Headquarters: Belfast
- Ideology: Irish republicanism
- Wars: Dissident Irish Republican campaign

The Irish Republican Liberation Army (IRLA) is an Irish paramilitary "self-styled vigilante group".

== Origins ==
The IRLA is centred on Belfast in the Ardoyne area. The Irish News suggested that its membership were from a County Antrim family with links to the Loyalist Volunteer Force, while others have suggested they splintered from the Continuity IRA (CIRA).

== Threats ==
Following the deaths of two of its members in squabbles over firearms in November 2007, Ed Burns and Joe Jones, the former who was shot near the GAA St Galls' club in West Belfast and the latter who was beaten to death with a shovel in Ardoyne, the group threatened retribution against Republican Sinn Féin, the alleged political wing of the CIRA, believed responsible for the deaths. Veteran west Belfast activist, Geraldine Taylor, a Republican Sinn Féin candidate in the Assembly elections, and a north Belfast Republican Sinn Féin member, were told by police that their lives were in danger. The threat was said to have come from the apparently "self-styled vigilante group", the IRLA. Further to this, two other republicans were also warned of the danger to their lives.

The Independent Monitoring Commission said the IRLA has a small arms collection, though its threat is not "terrorist in nature".

In the twentieth IMC report, the IRLA was set to be an "essentially a group of criminals taking a republican banner in order to give supposed status to their activities". Although the group committed at least one other shooting it was not recognised as immediately threatening.

== Government response ==
On 5 March 2008, East Antrim MP Sammy Wilson asked the Minister of State for Security, Counter-Terrorism, Crime and Policing Tony McNulty if he would consider prohibiting the Irish Republican Liberation Army under the Terrorism Act 2000. McNulty replied that "As a matter of normal policy and practice we do not comment on organisations not on the proscribed list."
