= John White =

John White may refer to:

== Actors ==
- John White (actor) (born 1981), Canadian actor
- John Sylvester White (1919–1988), American actor

== Artists and photographers ==
- John White (colonist and artist) (c. 1540–c. 1590), governor of the Roanoke Colony
- John White (photographer) (1850–1932), British photographer
- John White (South Australian painter) (1854–1943), painter and pharmacist
- John H. White (photojournalist) (born 1945), American photographer
- John M. White (born 1937), American performance artist, sculptor and painter

== Educators ==
- John A. White (born 1939), American professor and University of Arkansas chancellor emeritus
- John F. White (1917–2005), American academic administrator
- John T. White (1856–1924), Maryland school administrator; author of proposed alternate lyrics to Maryland state song

== Musicians ==
- John White (composer) (1936–2024), English composer and musician
- John White (singer) (1902–1992), American country music singer, writer on the genre of western music
- John Clifford White, Australian composer
- John Paul White (born 1972), American singer-songwriter and member of The Civil Wars
- John Simon White (1910–2001), American vocal coach and opera director

== Politicians ==
=== Canada ===
- John White (Conservative MP) (1833–1894), Canadian politician
- John White (Frontenac County) (c. 1760–1800), Canadian politician
- John White (Liberal MP) (1811–1897), Canadian politician
- John White (Nova Scotia politician) (born 1967), Canadian politician
- John White (Ontario politician) (1925–1996), provincial cabinet minister
- John Franklin White (1873–1961), Conservative member of the Canadian House of Commons

=== United Kingdom ===
- John White (died 1407), in 1388 MP for Norfolk
- John White (fl.1406), MP for Dartmouth (UK Parliament constituency)
- John White (fl.1397–1410), MP for Reading (UK Parliament constituency)
- John White, Member of the English Parliament for the City of London, 1566–1571
- John White (died 1573) of Aldershot, Lord Mayor of London 1563-4
- John White (died 1597), MP for Clitheroe
- John White (Welsh lawyer) (1590–1645), lawyer and MP for Southwark, 1640–1645
- John White (1634–1713), Member of Parliament for Nottinghamshire
- John White (1699–1769), Member of Parliament for East Retford
- John White (1748–1813), surveyor and builder in Marylebone for the Duke of Portland
- John Bazley White (1848–1927), Member of Parliament for Gravesend, 1886–1892
- John Baker White (British politician) (1902–1988)
- John White (loyalist) (born 1950), convicted murderer, Northern Ireland
- Robert John White, known as John White, president of the Ulster Unionist Party and former mayor of Coleraine
- John White, 1st Baron Overtoun (1843–1908), Scottish chemical manufacturer, supporter of religious causes, philanthropist and Liberal politician
- Sir John White (1558–1625), High Sheriff of Nottinghamshire

=== United States ===
- John White (Kentucky politician) (1802–1845), speaker of the U.S. House of Representatives
- John Barber White (1847–1923), American lumber businessman and politician in Pennsylvania
- John D. White (1849–1920), American politician from Kentucky
- John Phillip White (1870–1934), president of the United Mine Workers of America
- John E. White (1873–1943), American politician in Massachusetts
- John Coyle White (1924–1995), chairman of the U.S. Democratic National Committee
- John White (Ohio politician) (born 1959), member of the Ohio House of Representatives
- John F. White Jr. (born 1949), Pennsylvania politician
- John Hannibal White (1828–1878), South Carolina politician
- John L. White (1930–2001), New Jersey politician
- John P. White (1937–2017), US Deputy Secretary of Defense, 1995–1997
- John W. White (politician) (1863–1921), American politician from Mississippi
- John White (Georgia politician) (born 1940), member of the Georgia House of Representatives
- John White (Louisiana politician) (born 1975), Louisiana state superintendent of education since 2012
- John White (Maryland politician), U.S. congressional candidate in Maryland
- John White (diplomat) (1884–1967), US Ambassador to Haiti, Peru, on List of high commissioners of the United Kingdom to Barbados
- John Baker White (clerk of court) (1794–1862), American military officer, lawyer, court clerk, and civil servant
- John Baker White (West Virginia politician) (1868–1944), American military officer, lawyer, and politician in West Virginia
- John B. White (Oklahoma politician) (1932/1933–2000)

=== Other places ===
- John White (Australian politician) (1942–2020), Australian politician, member of Tasmanian state parliament, 1986–1998
- John White (colonial administrator) (died 1692), acting governor of Jamaica, 1691–1692
- John White (Irish politician), Irish Farmers' Party / Cumann na nGaedhael politician, TD for Donegal, 1923–1933
- John White (New Zealand politician) (1830–1876)
- John White (Queensland politician) (1853–1922), member of the Queensland Legislative Assembly for Musgrave

== Scientists and medical professionals ==
- John White (chemist) (1937–2023), Australian professor of physical and theoretical chemistry
- John White (surgeon) (1756–1832), Surgeon-General of New South Wales
- John G. White (biologist) (born 1943), co-developed confocal microscopy and mapped the complete nervous system of C. elegans
- John U. White, inventor of the White cell, a multipass spectroscopic absorption cell

== Religious figures ==
- John White (archdeacon of Meath) (fl. 1432–1478), Irish priest
- John White (bishop) (1510–1560), English bishop
- John White (chaplain) (1570–1615), English clergyman
- John White (colonist priest) (1575–1648), English Puritan clergyman
- John White, alias of Augustine Bradshaw (1575–1618), Benedictine monk
- John White (minister) (1867–1951), Moderator of the General Assembly in 1925 and 1929
- John White (provost of St Edmundsbury) (1895–1958), Anglican priest
- John Chanler White (1867–1956), Episcopal bishop of Springfield
- John Hazen White (1849–1925), Episcopal bishop in Indiana

== Sportsmen ==
- J. T. White (1920–2005), American football player and coach
- Jock White (1897–1986), Scottish footballer, born John White
- John White (cricketer, born 1855), English cricketer, played as a wicket-keeper
- John White (footballer, born 1887) (1887–1950), Australian rules footballer for Richmond
- John White (footballer, born 1937) (1937–1964), Scottish international footballer for Falkirk and Tottenham Hotspur
- John White (footballer, born 1955), Australian footballer for North Melbourne
- John White (footballer, born 1986), English football player
- John White (New Zealand footballer), football (soccer) player for New Zealand
- John White (rower) (1916–1997), American rower
- John White (running back, born 1991), American player of Canadian football
- John White (sportsman) (1877–1958), English cricketer and footballer
- John White (squash player) (born 1973), Scottish squash player
- John White (tight end) (1935–1988), American football player
- John White, Irish steeplechase rider who was first past the post in the void 1993 Grand National
- John Henry White (born 1955), Canadian football player

== Writers ==
- John White (Christian author) (1924–2002), author of The Archives of Anthropos series
- John White (ethnographer) (1826–1891), New Zealand public servant and historian
- John Herbert White (1880–1920), co-author of Modern Chess Openings
- John Talbot White (1925–1983), British lecturer, naturalist and writer

== Others ==
- John White (art historian) (1924–2021), English art historian
- John White (jurist) (1911–2007), New Zealand Queen's Counsel
- John White (major) (c. 1745–1777), native Irish soldier in the American Revolutionary War
- John A. White (colonel) (born 1924), American former marine and police officer
- John Berry White (1833/1834–1896), British philanthropist and British Army officer
- John Campbell White (diplomat) (1884–1967), American diplomat, US ambassador to Haiti and Peru
- John Campbell White (United Irishman) (1757–1847), executive member of the Society of United Irishmen
- John Chambers White (c. 1770–1845), Royal Navy admiral
- John Claude White (1853–1918), engineer, photographer, author and civil servant in British India
- John Griswold White (1845–1928), Cleveland attorney and collector of books about chess, folklore, and Orientalia
- John H. White (Medal of Honor) (1835–1912), American soldier and Medal of Honor recipient
- John H. White Jr. (born 1933), American historian and museum curator
- John R. White (c. 1799–1872), American slave trader
- John Tahourdin White (1809–1893), English classical scholar
- John W. White (general) (1910–1992), US Air Force general
- Johnnie White (1946/1947–2007), staff officer of the Official Irish Republican Army

== See also ==
- Jack White (disambiguation)
- Johnny White (disambiguation)
- Jean White (disambiguation)
- Jon White (disambiguation)
- Jonathan White (disambiguation)
- John Whyte (disambiguation)
- John Wight (disambiguation)
- John Baker White (disambiguation)
- John H. White (disambiguation)
- White (surname)
