= Jack White (disambiguation) =

Jack White (born 1975) is an American musician and singer-songwriter.

Jack White may also refer to:

== Sports ==
=== Cricket ===
- Jack White (Australian cricketer) (born 1999), Australian cricketer
- Jack White (cricketer, born 1891) (1891–1961), English cricket captain
- Jack White (cricketer, born 1893) (1893–1968), English cricketer
- Jack White (cricketer, born 1992) (born 1992), English cricketer

=== Football ===
- Jack White (footballer, born 1876) (1876–1933), Australian rules footballer for St Kilda
- Jack White (footballer, born 1879) (1879–?), English footballer
- Jack White (footballer, born 1924) (1924–2011), English footballer

=== Other sports ===
- Jack White (basketball) (born 1997), Australian basketball player
- Jack White (golfer) (1873–1949), Scottish golfer
- Jack White (infielder) (1905–1971), 1920s baseball infielder
- Jack White (outfielder) (1878–1963), 1900s baseball outfielder
- Jack White (racing driver) (1920–1988), American stock car racing driver
- Jack White (sports executive) (1913–1997), American football and baseball executive

== Other ==
- Jack White (film producer) (1897–1984), film producer at Columbia Pictures (a.k.a. Preston Black)
- Jack White (music producer) (1940–2025), German producer of disco music
- Jack White (politician) (1925–2002), Canadian labour activist
- Jack White (priest), Anglican archdeacon in India
- Jack White (reporter) (1942–2005), American investigative reporter
- Jack White (sculptor) (1940–2017), American sculptor, painter and photographer
- Jack White (trade unionist) (1879–1946), Irish activist and co-founder of the Irish Citizen's Army
- Jack White (VC) (1896–1949), UK soldier, recognized for bravery in First World War
- Jack E. White (1921–1988), American physician and cancer surgeon
- James T. Licavoli (1904–1985), also known as Jack White, American mobster

== See also ==
- Jack Whyte (1940–2021), Scottish-Canadian novelist of historical fiction
- Jackson White (disambiguation)
- John White (disambiguation)
