= Jonathan White =

Jonathan White may refer to:

- Jonathan White (footballer) (1872-?), Scottish footballer, see List of Bury F.C. players (1–24 appearances)
- Jon White (rugby union) (Jonathon White, born 1935), Australian rugby union player
- Jonathan White (painter) (1938–2021), New Zealand artist
- Jonathan White (1955–1988), victim of Pan Am Flight 103, son of actor David White
- Jonathan White (admiral) (born c. 1957), U.S. Navy admiral and oceanographer
- Jonathan White (cricketer) (born 1979), English cricketer
- Jonathan White (actor) in Playdate

== See also ==
- Jon White (disambiguation)
- John White (disambiguation)
- Jack White (disambiguation)
- John Whyte (disambiguation)
