= John H. White =

John H. White may refer to:

- John H. White (photojournalist) (born 1945), African-American photographer, winner of the Pulitzer Prize
- John H. White (Medal of Honor), American soldier and Medal of Honor recipient
- John H. White Jr., American historian and museum curator
- John Hannibal White, South Carolina politician
- John Hazen White, Episcopal bishop in Indiana
- John Henry White (born 1955), Canadian football player
- John Herbert White (1880–1920), co-author of Modern Chess Openings
- John H. White (motorcyclist), participant in the 1935 to 1939 Isle of Man TT motorcycle races
- John Howard White, member of the 26th and 29th Legislative Assembly of Ontario

== See also ==
- John White (disambiguation)
