= Jean White (disambiguation) =

Jean White (1941–2010) was an English pastor.

Jean White may also refer to:

- Jean White-Haney (1877–1953), Australian botanist
- Jean-Guy White, Canadian sculptor and puppet designer/builder
- Jean White (physician) (1905–1974), Australian female flying medical doctor
- Jean White (politician), American politician

== See also ==
- Jean Whyte (1923–2003), Australian librarian and professor
- Gene White (disambiguation)
- John White (disambiguation)
