= Jon White =

Jon White may refer to:

- Jon White, of Blind Mr. Jones
- Jon Manchip White (1924–2013), Welsh American author
- Jon White (rugby union) (born 1935), Australian rugby union player

== See also ==
- Jonathan White (disambiguation)
- John White (disambiguation)
