= Passenger railroad car =

Railway vehicle for conveying passengers

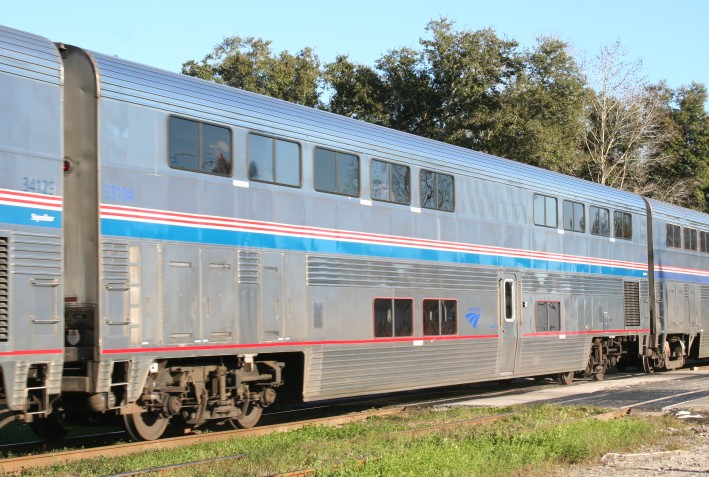
Superliner double-deck auto-train lounge car operated by Amtrak

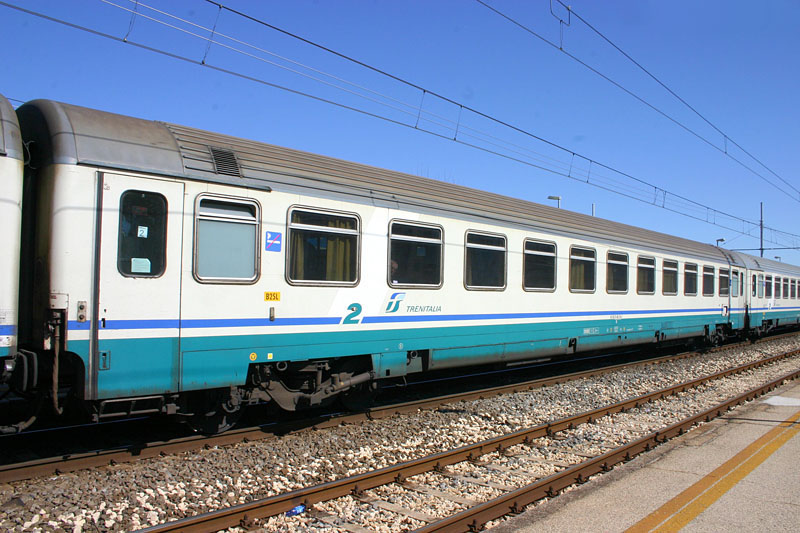
Trenitalia passenger car UIC-Z1

A passenger railroad car or passenger car (American English), also called a passenger carriage, passenger coach (British English and International Union of Railways), or passenger bogie (Indian English) is a railroad car that is designed to carry passengers, usually giving them space to sit on train seats. The term passenger car can also be associated with a sleeping car, a baggage car, a dining car, railway post office, and prisoner transport cars.

The first passenger cars were built in the early 1800s with the advent of railroads, and were small, little more than converted freight cars. Early passenger cars were constructed from wood; in the 1900s, construction shifted to steel and later aluminum for improved strength. Passenger cars have grown greatly in size since their earliest versions, with modern bi-level models capable of carrying over 100 passengers. Amenities for passengers have also improved over time, with developments such as lighting, heating, and air conditioning added for improved passenger comfort. In some systems, a choice is offered between first- and second-class carriages, with a premium for the former.

In some countries, such as the UK, coaching stock that is designed, converted, or adapted not to carry passengers is referred to as "NPCS" (non-passenger coaching stock); similarly, in the US, some maintenance (engineering) stock can be known as "MOW" (maintenance of way).

== History ==
=== 19th century: First passenger cars and early development ===
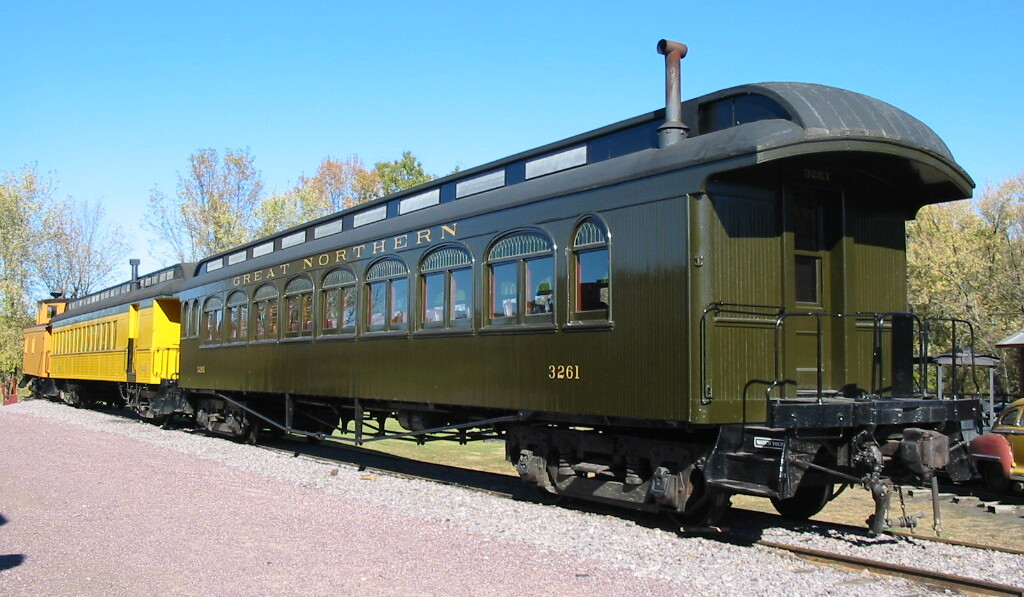
Restored clerestory cars on display at the Mid-Continent Railway Museum in North Freedom, Wisconsin

Up until about the end of the 19th century, most passenger cars were constructed of wood. The first passenger trains did not travel very far, but they could carry many more passengers over longer distances than wagons pulled by horses.

As railways were first constructed in England, so too were the first passenger cars. One of the early coach designs was the "Stanhope". It featured a roof and small holes in the floor for drainage when it rained, and had separate compartments for different classes of travel. The only problem with this design is that the passengers were expected to stand for their entire trip. The first passenger cars in the United States resembled stagecoaches. They were short, often less than 10 ft (3.05 m) long and had two axles.

A British company developed the first design for sleeping carriages, called "bed-carriages", which were built in 1838 for the London and Birmingham Railway and the Grand Junction Railway. When made up for sleeping, the foot of the bed was extended into a boot section at the end of the carriage. The cars were still too short to accommodate more than two or three beds positioned end-to-end.

Britain's Royal Mail commissioned and built the first travelling post office cars in the late 1840s as well. These cars resembled coaches in their short wheelbase and exterior design, but were equipped with side nets to catch mailbags while the train was in motion. American RPOs, first appearing in the 1860s, also featured equipment to catch mail bags at speed, but the American design more closely resembled a large hook that would catch the mailbag in its crook. When not in use, the hook would swivel down against the side of the car to prevent it from catching obstacles.

As locomotive technology progressed in the mid-19th century, trains grew in length and weight. Passenger cars, particularly in America, grew along with them, first getting longer by adding a second truck (one at each end), and wider as their suspensions improved. Cars built for European use featured side door compartments, while American car design favored what was called a train coach, a single long cabin with rows of seats, with doors located at the ends of the car. Early American sleeping cars were not compartmented, but by the end of the 19th century, they were. The compartments in the later sleepers were accessed from a side hall running the length of the cars, similar to the design of European cars well into the 20th century.

Many American passenger trains, particularly the long-distance ones, included an observation car at the end of the train. Until about the 1930s, these had an open-air platform at the rear, the "observation platform". These evolved into the closed-end car, usually with a rounded end, which was still called an "observation car". The interiors of observation cars varied. Many had special chairs and tables.

The end platforms of all passenger cars changed around the turn of the 20th century. Older cars had open platforms between cars. Passengers would enter and exit the car through a door at the end, which led to a narrow platform. Steps on either side of the platform were used for getting on or off the train, and one might hop from one car platform to another. Later cars had enclosed platforms called vestibules, which, together with gangway connections, allowed passengers not only to enter and exit the train protected from the elements but also to move more easily between cars with the same protection.

Dining cars first appeared in the late 1870s and into the 1880s. Until this time, the common practice was to stop for meals at restaurants along the way (which led to the rise of Fred Harvey's chain of Harvey House restaurants in America). At first, the dining car was simply a place to serve meals picked up en route, but it soon evolved to include galleys where the meals were prepared. The introduction of vestibuled cars, which for the first time allowed easy movement between cars, aided the adoption of dining cars, lounge cars, and other specialized cars.

=== 1900–1950: Transition from wood to steel, new car types ===
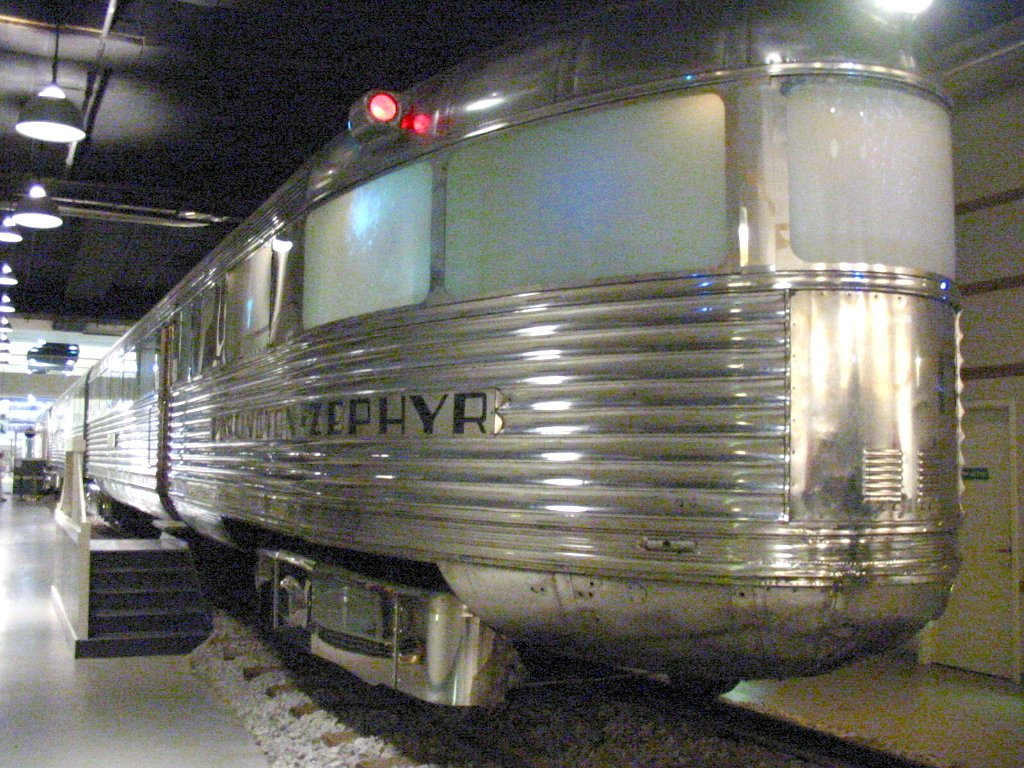
The observation car from the CB&Q's Pioneer Zephyr. The carbody was made of stainless steel in 1934; it is seen here at Chicago's Museum of Science and Industry in 2003.

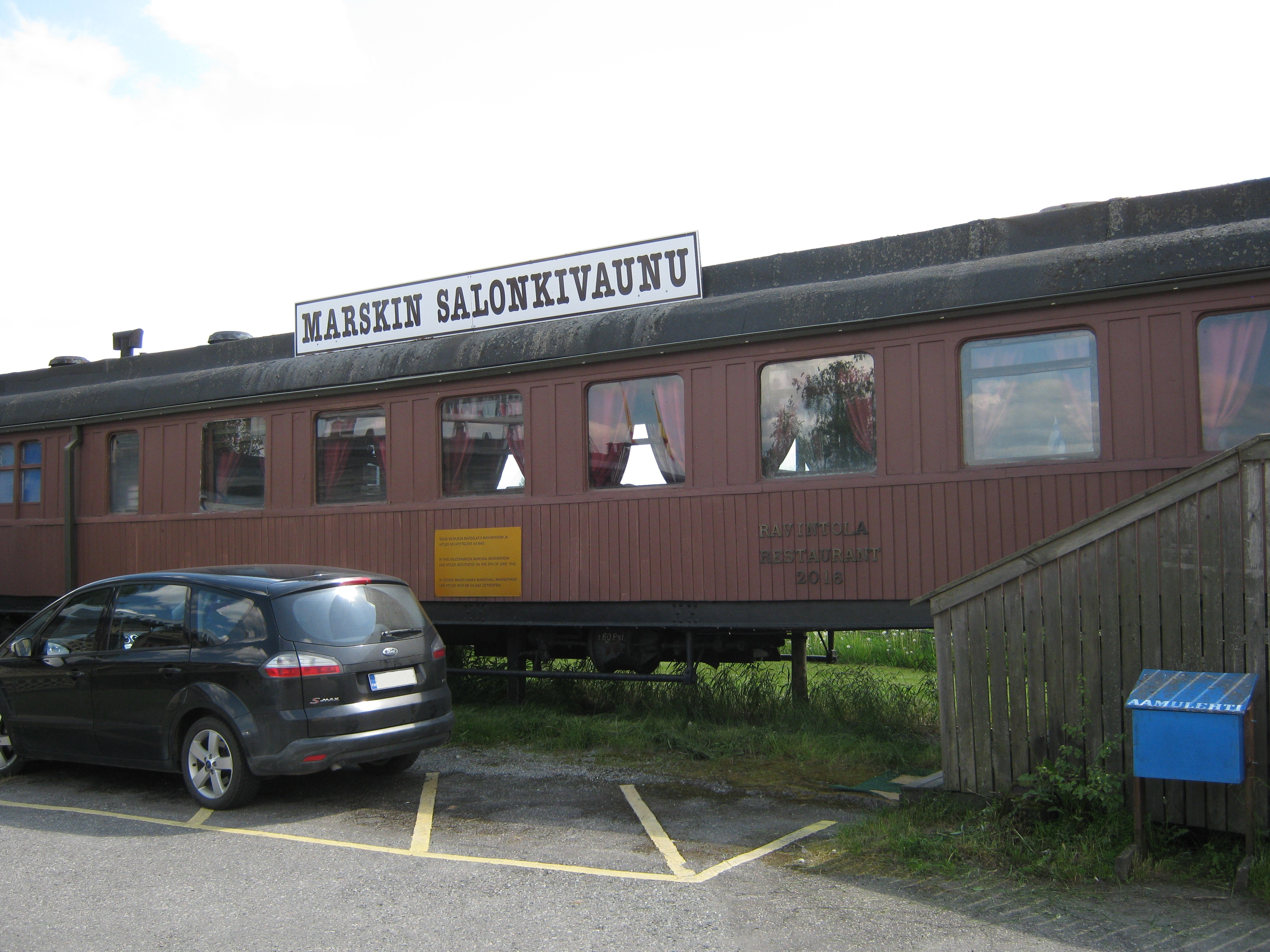
Marshal Mannerheim's saloon coach from 1939 to 1946 in Sastamala, Finland

In the early 1900s, safety concerns led the railroad industry to transition from wood to steel construction. Steel was heavier, but this transition occurred alongside the adoption of higher-powered locomotives. The Pennsylvania Railroad began building all-steel passenger cars in 1906 due to concerns about fire in the tunnels it was building to access Manhattan's Pennsylvania Station, which opened in 1910. Other railroads followed because steel cars were safer in accidents. During a transition period, some railroads put steel frames underneath wooden cars.

By the 1920s, passenger cars on the larger standard gauge railroads were normally between 60 ft (18.3 m) and 70 ft (21.3 m) long. The cars of this time were still quite ornate, many of them built by experienced coachmakers and skilled carpenters. In the United States, the so-called "chair car" with individual seating became commonplace on long-distance routes.

With the 1930s came the widespread use of stainless steel for car bodies. The typical passenger car was now much lighter than its carbon-steel cousins of old, though still much heavier than nineteenth-century wooden cars. The new "lightweight" and streamlined cars carried passengers at speed and in comfort to an extent not previously experienced. Aluminum and Cor-Ten steel were also used in lightweight car construction, but stainless steel was the preferred material for car bodies. Stainless steel cars could be and often were left unpainted except for the car's reporting marks that were required by law.

By the end of the 1930s, railroads and car builders were debuting car body and interior styles that could only be dreamed of before. In 1937, the Pullman Company delivered the first cars equipped with roomettes – that is, the car's interior was sectioned off into compartments, much like the coaches still in widespread use across Europe. Pullman's roomettes, however, were designed for a single traveller. The roomette featured a large picture window, a privacy door, a single fold-away bed, a sink, and a small toilet. The roomette's floor space was barely larger than the bed took up, but it allowed the traveller to ride in luxury compared to the multilevel semi-private berths of old.

Now that passenger cars were lighter, they could carry heavier loads, but the average passenger's weight didn't increase to match the cars' new capacities. The average passenger car could not be made any wider or longer due to side clearances along the railroad lines. However, it could generally be made taller because it was still lower than many freight cars and locomotives. The railroads soon began building and buying dome and bilevel cars to carry more passengers.

=== 1950–present: High-technology advancements ===
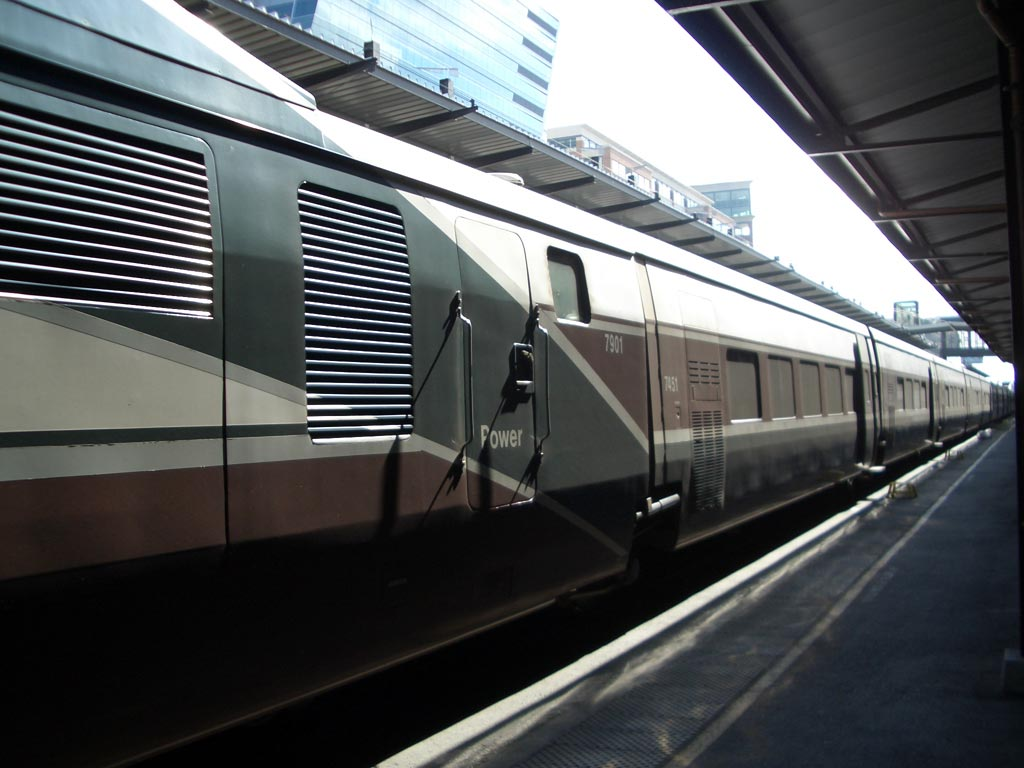
Amtrak Cascades operates with tilting Talgo permanently coupled trainsets.

Starting in the 1950s, the passenger travel market in North America declined, while commuter rail grew. Private intercity passenger service in the U.S. mostly ended with the creation of Amtrak in 1971. Amtrak took over equipment and stations from most U.S. railroads with intercity service.

The higher clearances in North America enabled a major advancement in passenger car design, bi-level (double-decker) commuter coaches that could hold more passengers. These cars became common in the United States in the 1960s and were adopted by Amtrak for the Superliner design, as well as by many other railroads and manufacturers. By 2000, double-deckers rivaled single-level cars in use around the world.

While intercity passenger rail travel declined in America, ridership continued to increase in other parts of the world. With the increase came an increased use of newer technology on existing and new equipment. The Spanish company Talgo began experimenting in the 1940s with technology that would enable the axles to steer into a curve, allowing the train to move around the curve at a higher speed. The steering axles evolved into mechanisms that would also tilt the passenger car as it entered a curve to counter the centrifugal force experienced by the train, further increasing speeds on existing track. Today, Talgo trains are used in many places in Europe, and they have also found a home in North America on some short- and medium-distance routes, such as between Eugene, Oregon, and Vancouver, British Columbia.

Another type of tilting train widely used across Europe is the Pendolino. These trains, built by Fiat Ferroviaria (now owned by Alstom), are in regular service in Italy, Portugal, Slovenia, Finland, Czech Republic and the United Kingdom. Using tilting trains, railroads can run passenger trains over the same tracks at higher speeds than would otherwise be possible.

Amtrak continued to push the development of U.S.-designed passenger equipment even when the market demand didn't support it, ordering many new passenger locomotives and car types in the 1980s and 1990s. However, by 2000, Amtrak had turned to European manufacturers for the Amtrak Cascades (Talgo) and Acela Express trains, its premier services. These trains use new designs and are made to operate as coherent "trainsets".

High-speed trains are composed of cars from a single manufacturer and usually have a uniform design (although the dining car on the German ICE 1 has a dome). In the 1960s and 1970s, countries around the world began developing trains capable of traveling at 150–200 mph to rival air travel. One of the first was France's TGV, which entered service in 1981. By 2000, Western Europe's major cities (London, Paris, Brussels, Amsterdam, Geneva, Berlin, Rome, etc.) were connected by high-speed rail service.

Often, tilting and high-speed cars are left in "trainsets" throughout their service. For example, articulated cars cannot be uncoupled without special equipment because the individual cars are coupled to a single truck. This gives modern trains a smooth, coherent appearance because all the cars and often the engines share a similar design and paint scheme.

== Car types ==
Traditionally, the passenger car can be divided into several distinct types.

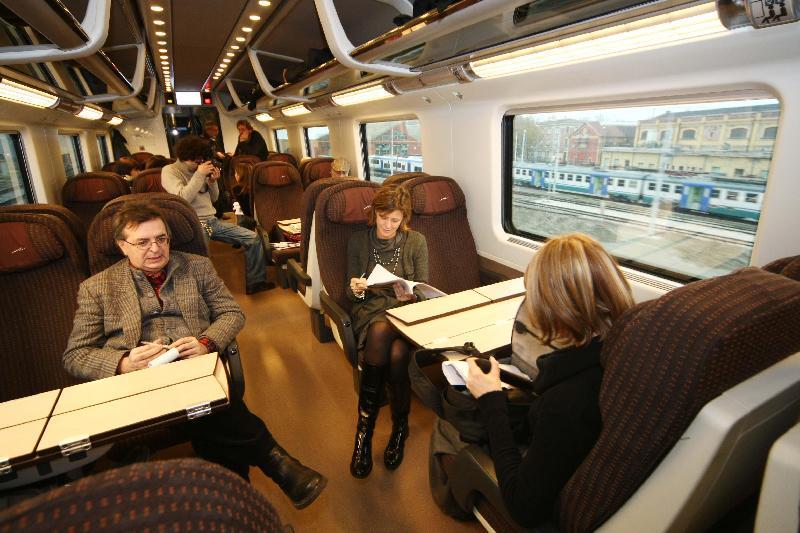
Second class of Eurostar Italia

The most basic division is between cars, which do carry passengers, and "head-end" equipment. The latter are run as part of passenger trains, but do not themselves carry passengers. Traditionally, they were put between the locomotive and the passenger-carrying cars in the consist, hence the name.

Some specialized types are variants of or combine elements of the most basic types.

Also, the basic design of passenger cars is evolving, with articulated units that share a truck, double-decker designs, and the "low floor" design, where the loading area is very close to the ground and slung between the trucks.

=== Passenger-carrying types ===
==== Coach ====
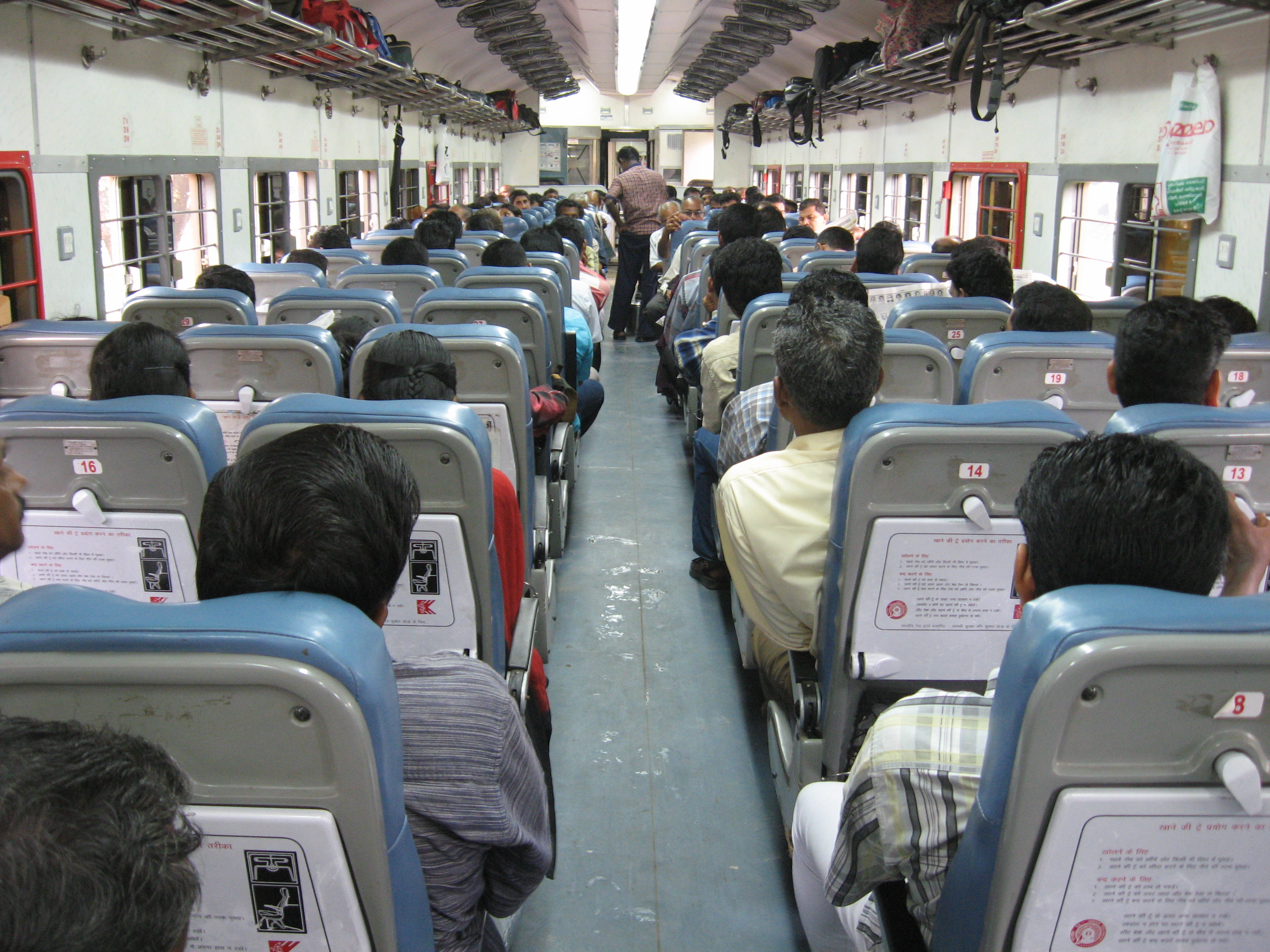
An open-type [3+3] chair car of Indian Railways

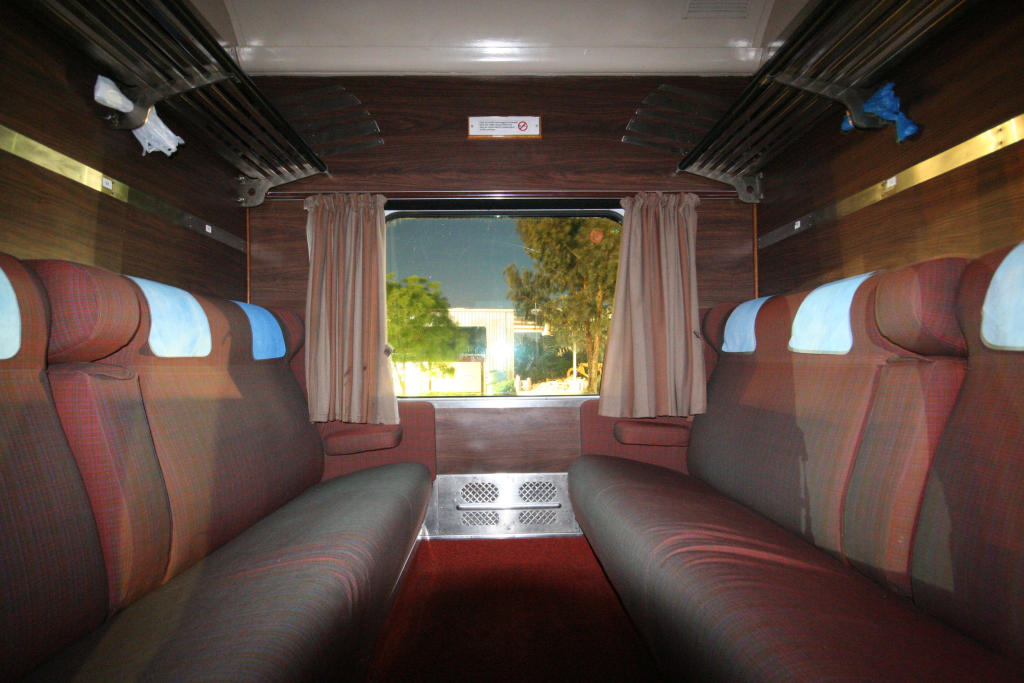
The interior of an Australian compartment car, viewed from the connecting side corridor

The coach is the most basic type of passenger car, also sometimes called "chair cars".

1. Open/Saloon
2. Compartment
3. Composite

Two main variants exist.

===== Open coach =====
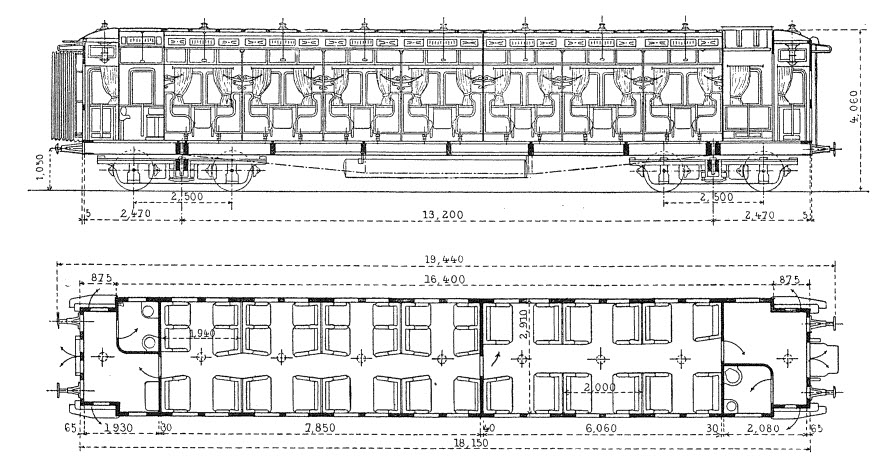
Open coach

In one variant, an "open coach" has a central aisle; the car's interior is often filled with row upon row of seats as in a passenger airliner, coach bus, or a school bus. Other arrangements of the "open" type are also found, including seats around tables, seats facing the aisle (often found on mass transit trains since they increase standing room for rush hour), and variations of all three. Seating arrangement is typically [2+2], while the hard seat in China has [3+2] arrangements. The seating arrangements and density, as well as the presence or absence of other facilities, depend on the intended use, ranging from mass transit systems to long-distance luxury trains. Some cars have reclining seats to make it easier for passengers not traveling in a sleeping car to sleep.

===== Compartment =====
====== Corridor coach ======
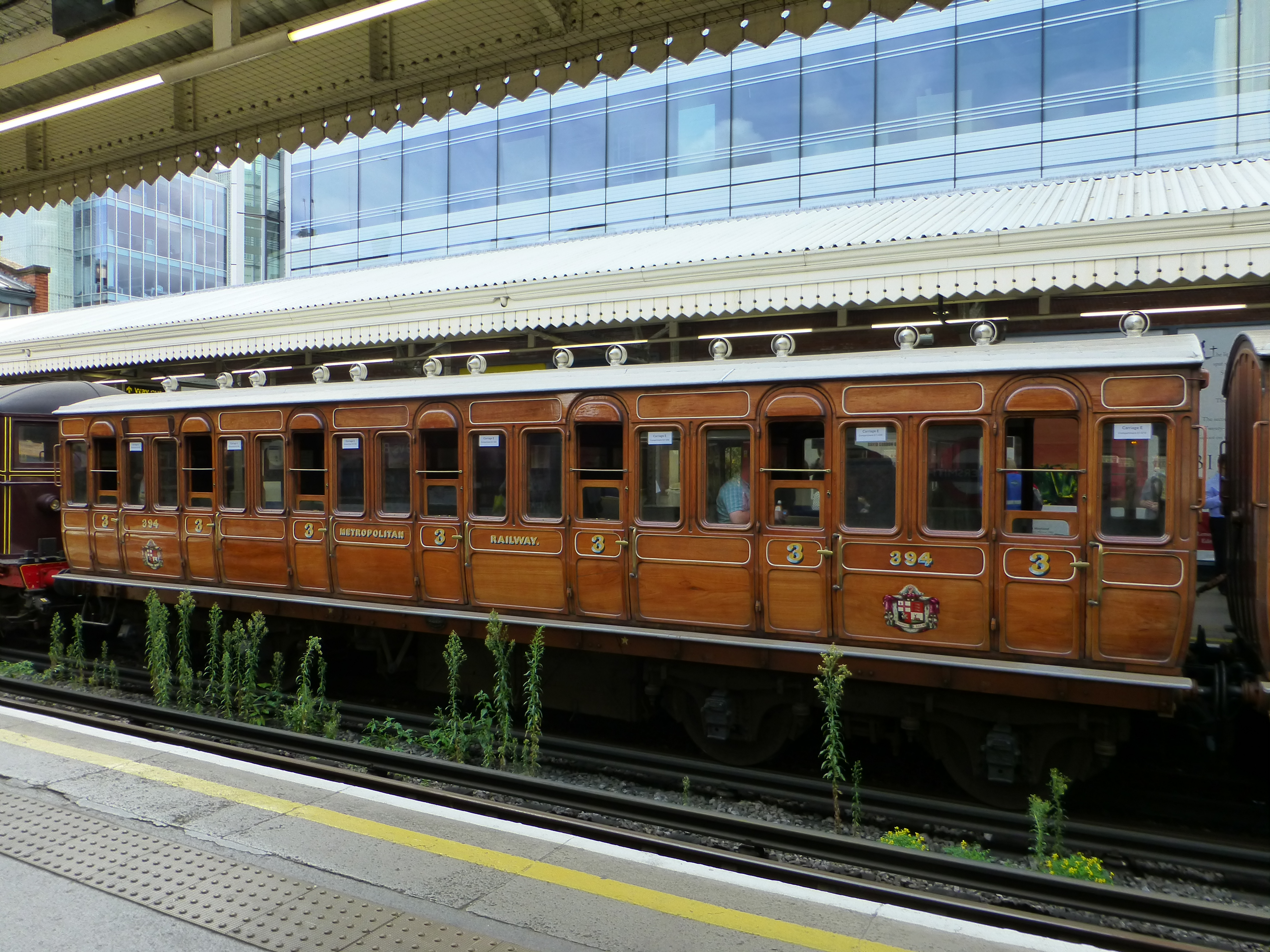
Full width compartment coach with no aisle or corridor

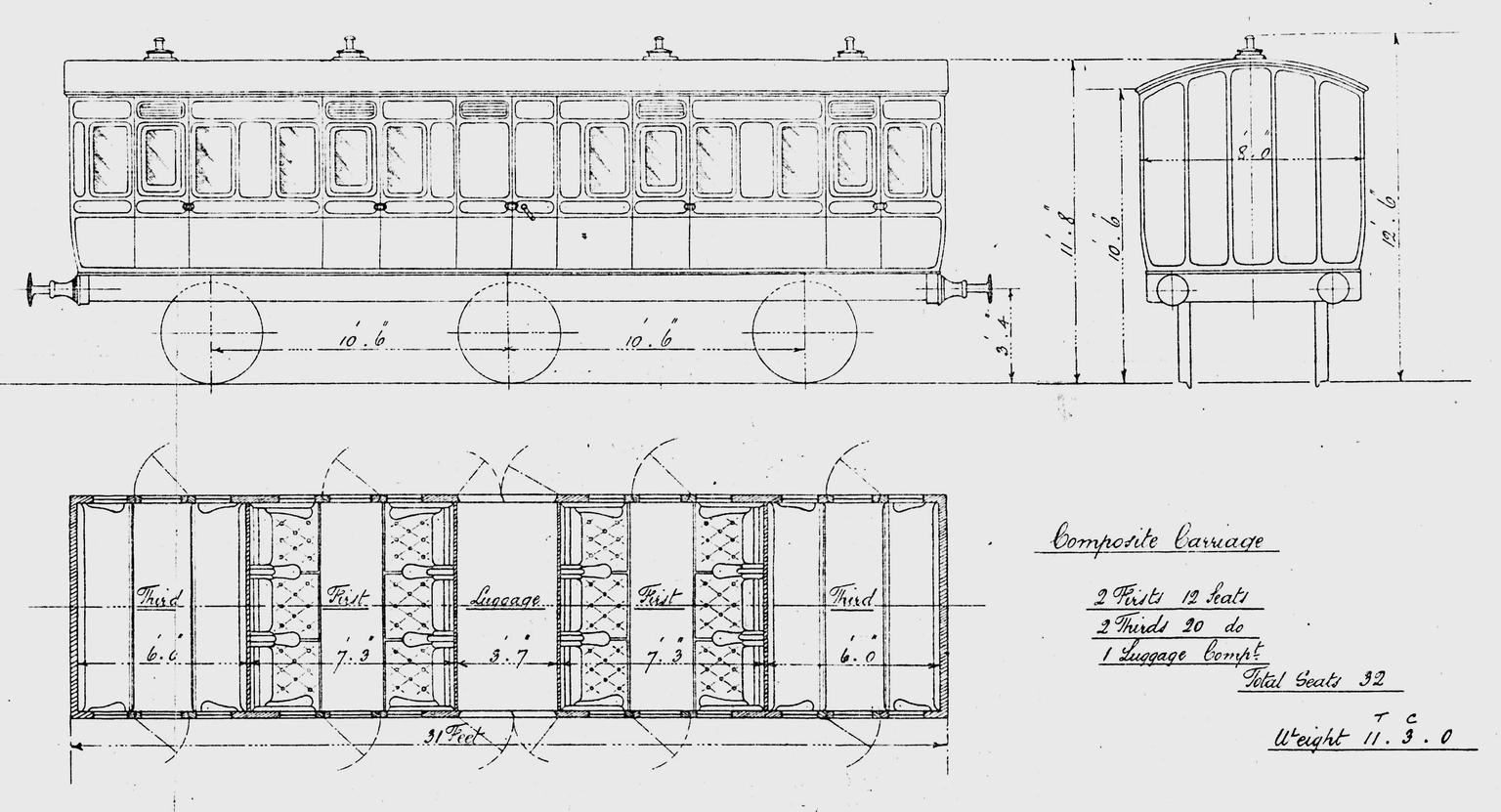
Profile of a compartment carriage with no corridor

In another variant, "closed" coaches, "corridor" coaches, or "compartment" cars have a side corridor to connect individual compartments along the body of the train, each with two rows of seats facing each other.

In both arrangements, carry-on baggage is stowed on a shelf above the passenger seating area. The opening into the cars is usually located at both ends of the carriage, often into a small hallway, which in railway parlance is termed a vestibule. Earlier designs of UK coaching stock had additional doors or doors along their length, some supporting compartmentalised carriages.

====== Compartment coach ======
The compartment coach is similar to a corridor coach but without the corridor. Each compartment is completely separated from the others, with no movement between them. Entry and exit from each compartment are only possible when stopped at a station.

===== Composite =====
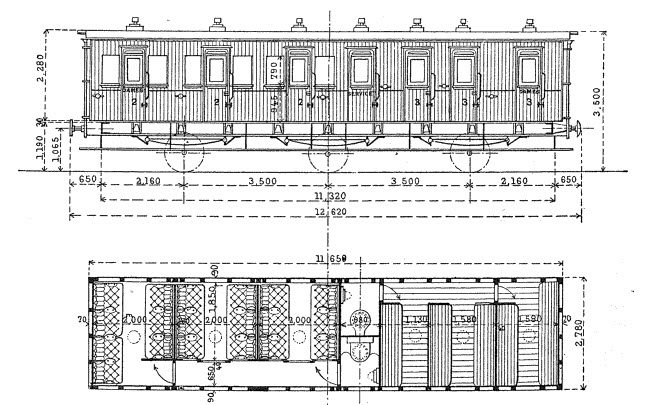
Composite coach schematic

"Composite" coaches are also known. These are mixed-class cars featuring both open seating and compartments. One such coach is the Composite Corridor, introduced for British Rail in the 1950s; though such coaches existed from early pre-grouping days, at the end of the 19th century.

In India, normal carriages often have double-height seating, with benches (berths), so that people can sit above one another (not unlike a bunk bed). In other countries, true double-decker carriages are becoming more common. The seats in most coaches until the middle of the 20th century were usually bench seats; the backs of these seats could be adjusted, often with one hand, to face in either direction so the car would not have to be turned for a return trip. The conductor would walk down the aisle in the car, reversing the seat backs to prepare for the return trip. This arrangement is still used in some modern trains.

==== Dining car ====
A dining car (or diner) serves meals to passengers. Its interior may be split with a portion of the interior partitioned off for a galley, which is off-limits to passengers. A narrow hallway is left between the galley and one side wall of the car for passengers. The remainder of the interior is arranged with tables and chairs to resemble a long, narrow restaurant dining room. There are special personnel to perform waitstaff and kitchen duties.

==== Lounge ====
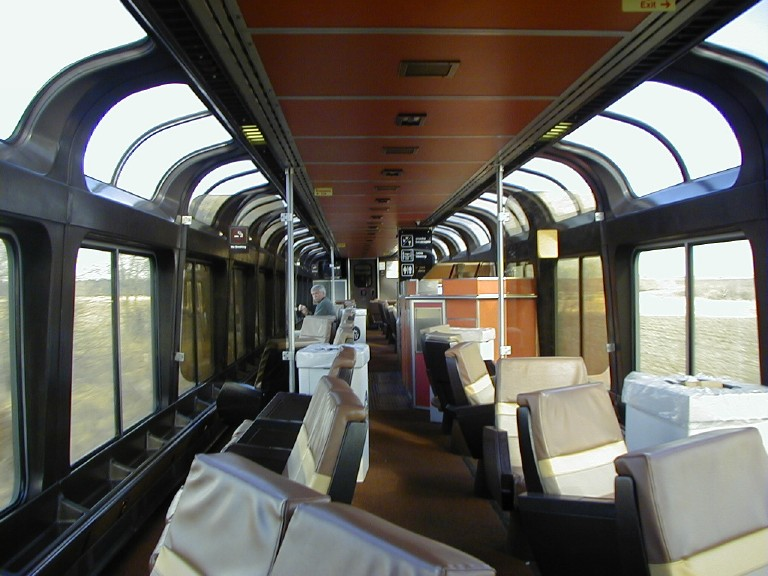
Amtrak Superliner lounge car (also a low-floor, double-decker car)

Lounge cars carry a bar and public seating. They usually have benches, armchairs, or large swivelling chairs along the sides of the car. They often have small tables for drinks, or they may be large enough to play cards. Some lounge cars include small pianos and are staffed by contracted musicians to entertain the passengers.

These cars are often pulled in addition to the dining car, and on very long trains in addition to one or more snack or café cars. Café cars, such as the Amtrak café cars, are simpler, lacking window-facing seats; instead, rows of tables with facing pairs of bench seats, split by a food and drink counter.

Lounge cars are an important part of the appeal of passenger trains compared to aircraft, buses, and cars; they offer more space to move around, socialize, eat, and drink, and good views.

==== Observation ====
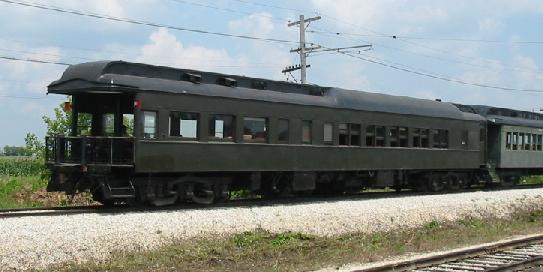
A heavyweight observation car

In US practice, the observation car was almost always the last car on a passenger train. Its interior could include features of a coach, lounge, diner, or sleeper. The main spotting feature was at the tail end of the car. Some more modern US designs had car walls usually curved together to form a large U-shape, and larger windows were installed all around the ends of the car; earlier designs had square ends with an observation open deck (preserved stock in Southern Africa, Oceania, and many countries elsewhere). Before these cars were built with steel walls, the observation ends of heavyweight cars in the US and Canada resembled a roofed porch. Larger windows were installed at the observation end on these cars as well. At the end of the car, there was almost always a lounge where passengers could enjoy the view as they watched the track rapidly recede into the distance.

==== Sleeping car ====
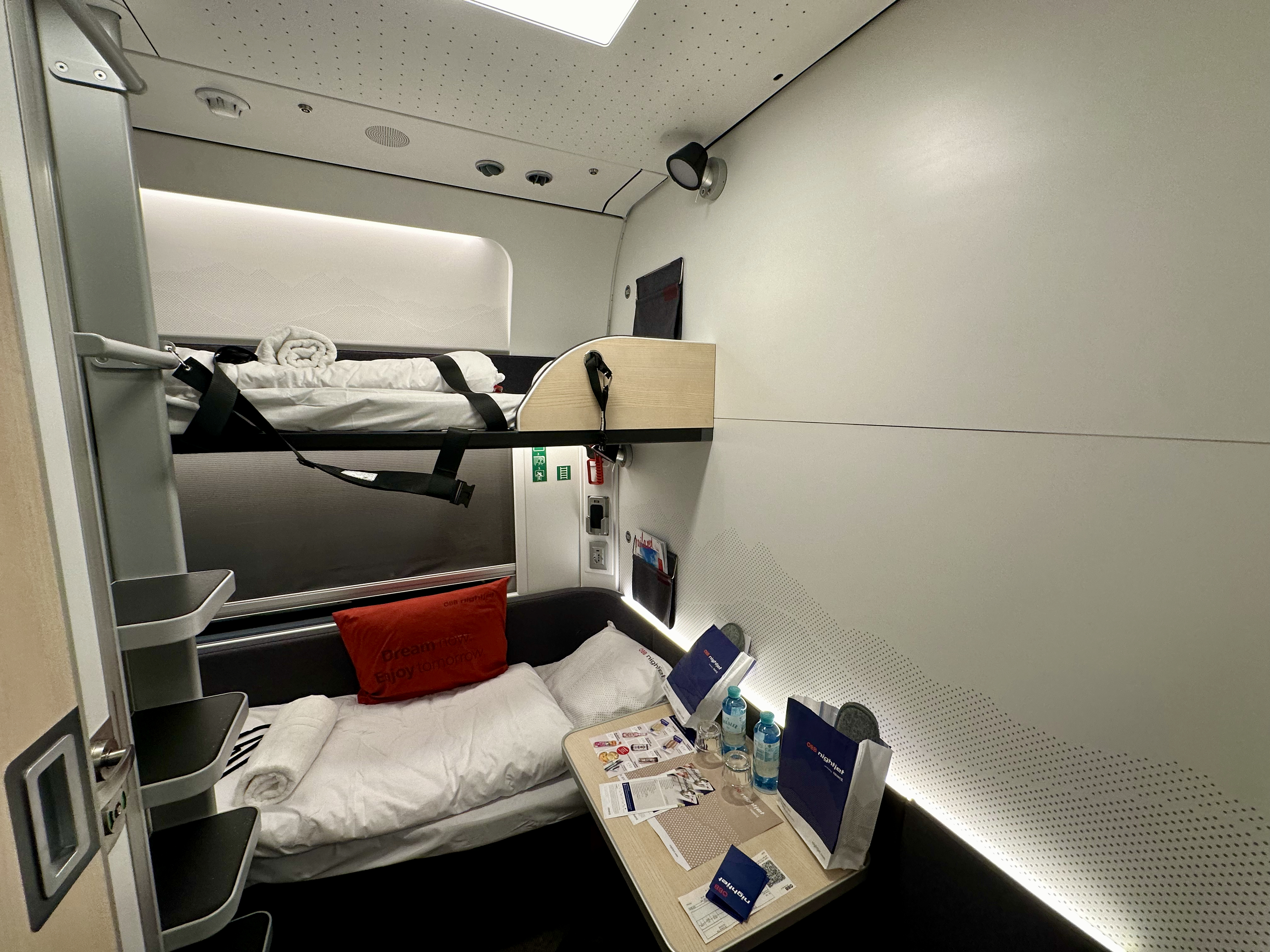
Interior of a sleeper train cabin (in an Austrian ÖBB Nightjet)

Often called "sleepers" or "Pullman cars" (after the main American operator), these cars provide sleeping arrangements for passengers travelling at night. Early models were divided into sections, where coach seating converted at night into semi-private berths. Modern interiors are typically partitioned into separate bedroom compartments for passengers. The beds are designed to roll out of the way, fold out of the way, or convert into seats for daytime use. Compartments vary in size; some are large enough for only a bed, while others resemble efficiency apartments, including bathrooms.

In China, sleeping cars still serve as major travel classes in long-range rail transport. The classes of sleeping cars include hard sleeper (YW) with six bunks per compartment, soft sleeper (RW) typically with four bunks, and deluxe soft sleeper (GRW) typically with two bunks.

==== Trailer car ====
A similar car which was usually found in DMUs, EMUs, and locomotive-hauled passenger trainsets. They also generally intermediate cars within the consist and sometimes have driving control facilities. They may carry auxiliary equipment (e.g., the braking system, air conditioning, etc.) where space is limited.

=== Head-end equipment ===
==== Baggage car ====
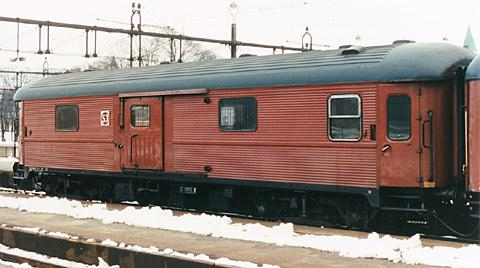
A resgodsvagn of the Swedish State Railways (SJ) in Malmö in 1988

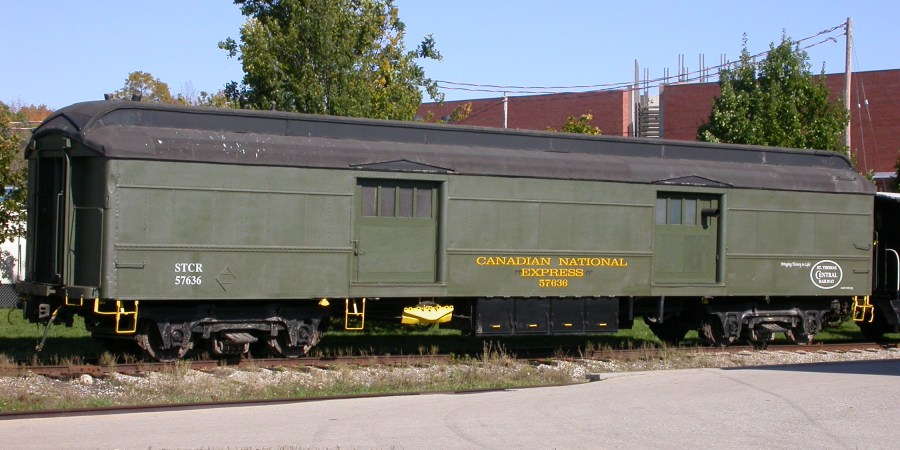
A baggage car

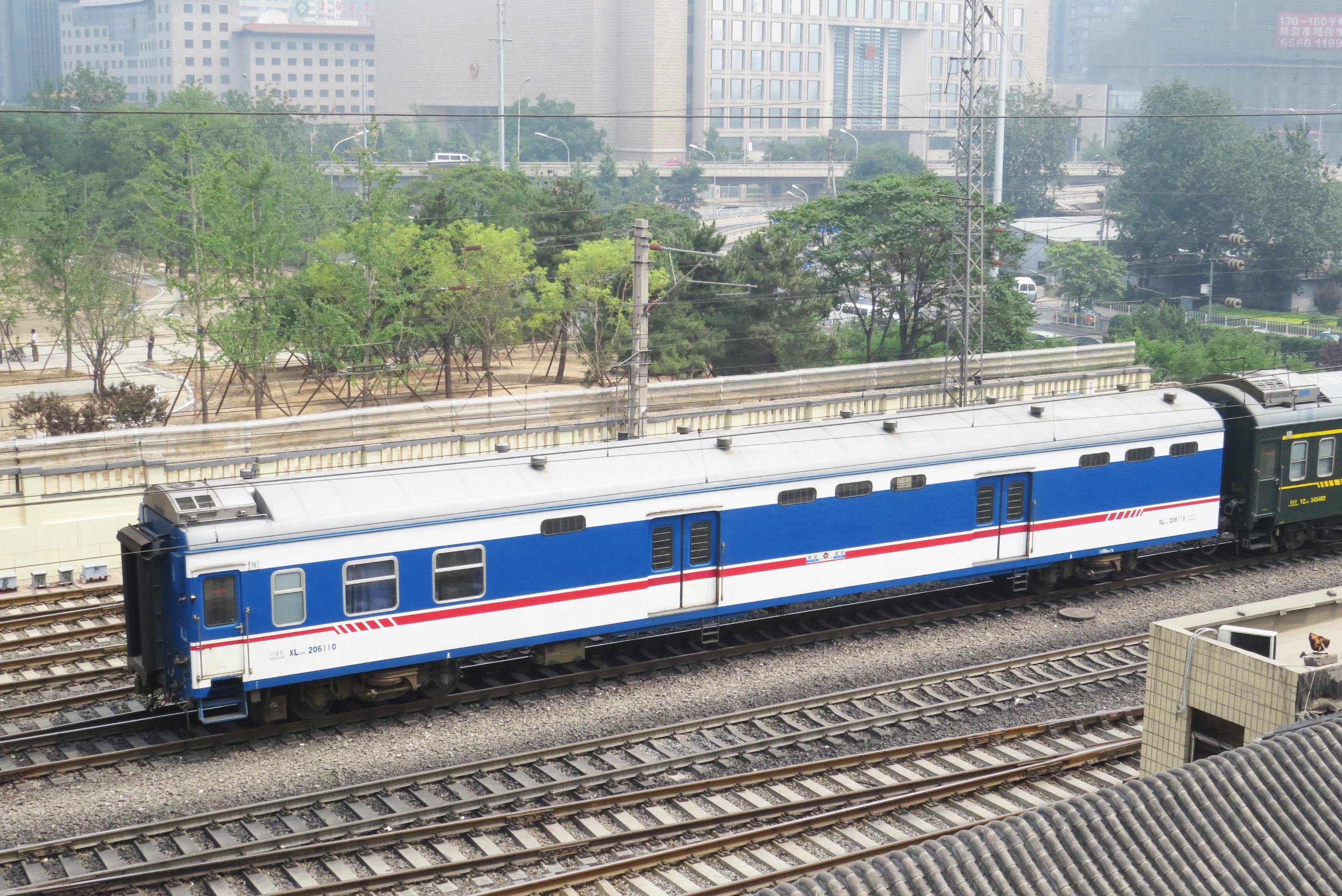
A China Railway XL25K baggage car at Beijing railway station

Although passengers were generally not allowed access to the baggage car, it was included on a great number of passenger trains as regular equipment. The baggage car was normally placed between the train's motive power and the remainder of the passenger train. The car's interior is normally wide open and is used to carry passengers' checked baggage. Baggage cars were also sometimes commissioned by freight companies to haul less-than-carload (LCL) shipments along passenger routes (Railway Express Agency was one such freight company). Some baggage cars included restroom facilities for the train crew, so many baggage cars had doors to access them just like any other passenger car, although they did not always have windows along the side. Baggage cars could be designed to look like the rest of a passenger train's cars, or they could be repurposed box cars equipped with high-speed trucks and passenger train steam and air connections. However, they are typically plainer in finish, shorter in length, less influenced by changing fashion, and longer in service life than other passenger cars. A special type of baggage car came equipped with doors on one end to facilitate transport of large pieces of equipment and scenery for Broadway shows and other productions. These "theatrical" baggage cars were assigned theatrical names (i.e. Romeo and Juliet), and were similar to the "horse cars" that were used to transport racehorses.

==== Express car ====
Express cars carry high-value freight in passenger consists. These cars often resembled baggage cars, though in some cases specially equipped boxcars or refrigerator cars were used. In the United States, the majority of these cars were operated by Railway Express Agency (REA) from 1918 to 1975. Following REA's bankruptcy, Amtrak took over express-type shipments under the Amtrak Express brand, eventually introducing rolling stock such as material handling cars and roadrailers. Amtrak mostly exited the express business in 2003, now only using extra space in baggage cars on trains.

==== Prisoner car ====
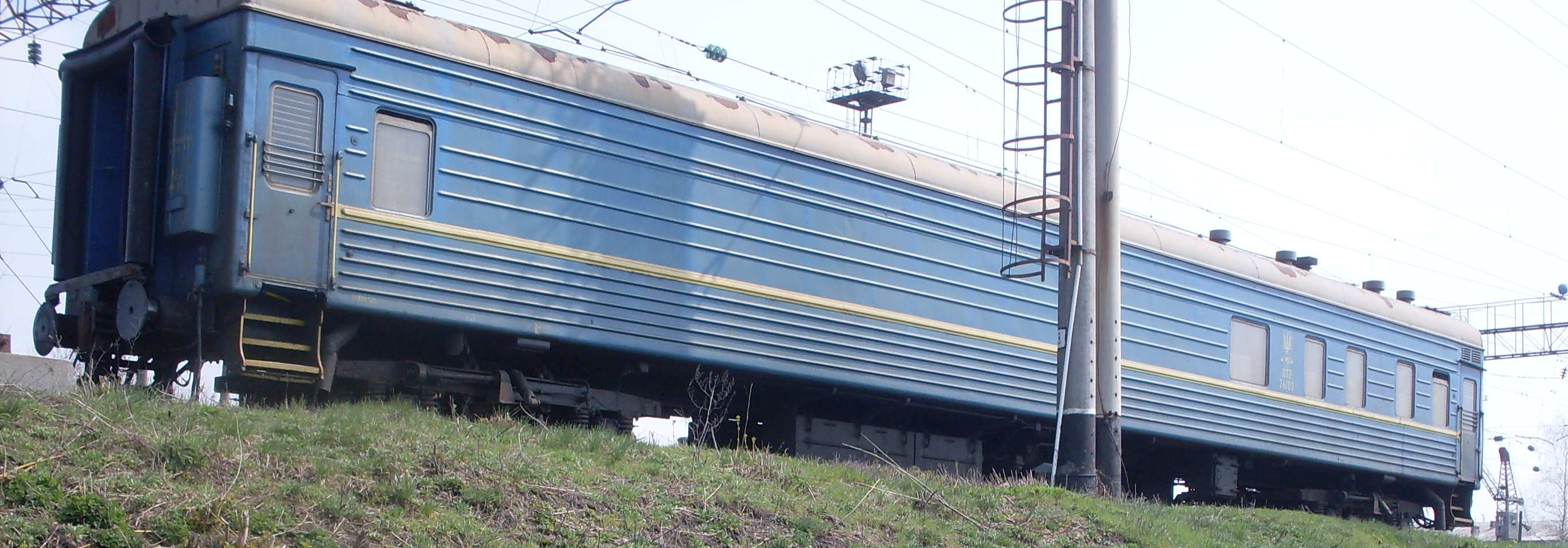
A Soviet-style prisoner car. Note the absence of windows in the cells (the corridor on the other side has matte glass windows).

In some countries, such as Russia, convicts are transported from court to prison or from one prison to another by railway. In such transportation, a specific type of coach, a prisoner car, is used. It contains several cell compartments with minimal interior and commodities, and a separate guard compartment. Usually, the windows are opaque, nontransparent glass to prevent prisoners from seeing outside and determining their location, and they also have bars to prevent escapes. Unlike other passenger cars, prison cars do not have doors at the ends of the wagon.

==== Railway post office ====
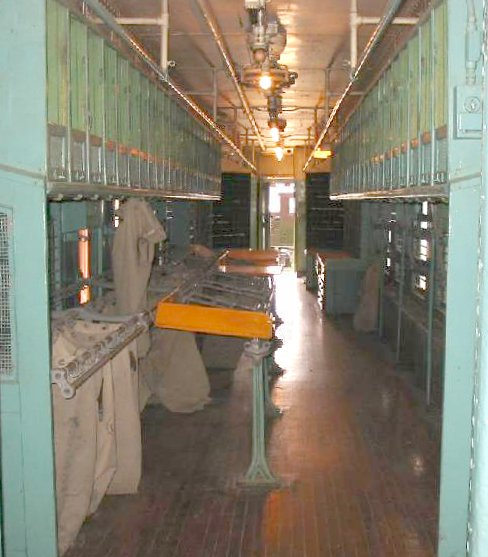
The interior of a railway post office on display at the National Railroad Museum in Green Bay, Wisconsin

Like baggage cars, railway post office (RPO; US term) cars or travelling post offices (TPOs; British term) were not accessible to paying passengers. These cars' interiors were designed with sorting facilities that were often seen and used in conventional post offices around the world. The RPO is where mail was sorted while the train was en route. Because these cars carried mail, which often included valuables or large amounts of cash and checks, the RPO staff (who were employed by the postal service, not the railroad) were the only train crews allowed to carry guns. The RPO cars were normally placed in a passenger train between the train's motive power and baggage cars, further inhibiting their access by passengers.

=== Specialized types ===
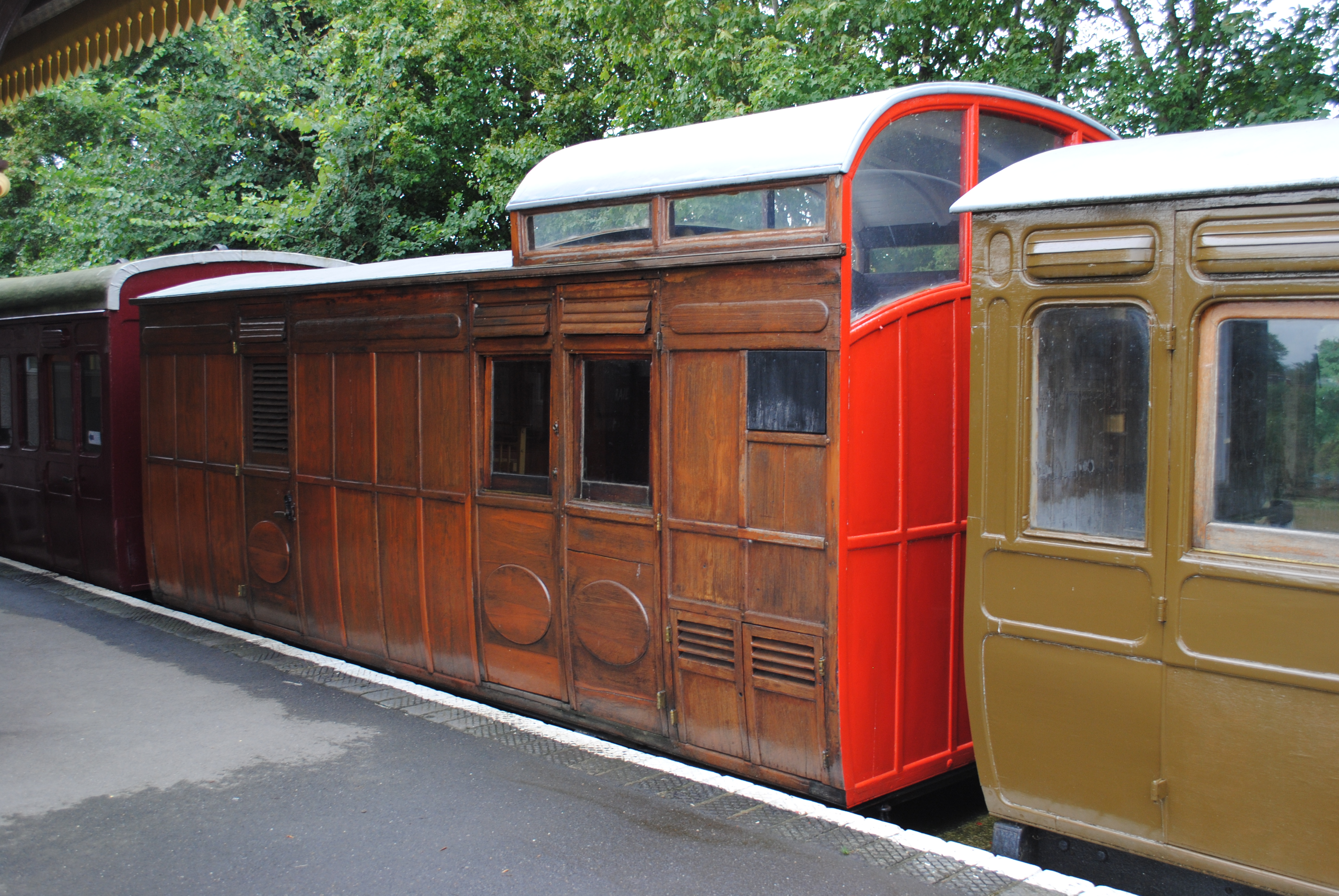
North London Railway birdcage brake

==== Birdcage carriage ====
A birdcage car, or carriage, was a name used for a variety of arrangements. In the English use of the term, a short section of the roof was raised above the normal roof level, with windows being provided at both ends. The supports for the raised section doubled as window frames, giving the appearance of a bird cage. It was most commonly used in south east England to describe a brake coach, from which the guard was able to keep a lookout along the train using a "birdcage" on the roof, which were used from 1899 on the South Eastern & Chatham Railway. On the Chicago, Burlington & Quincy railroad, in the early 1880s, a birdcage car described an early form of dome car. In New Zealand birdcage carriages, officially named gallery cars, were built at Addington from 1889 and one was in a crash in 1897, but they were coaches with larger than usual open areas, protected by railings, or cages, which allowed for more comfortable travel in warm, humid weather. They remained in use by New Zealand Railways until at least 1934 and similar open air AKV coaches are still used by Great Journeys trains.

==== Colonist Car ====
A colonist car, or emigrant car, was a special sleeping car designed to transport immigrants from ocean ports to settlement areas in western North America at the lowest possible fare. They offered simple sleeping berths and a cooking area for immigrants who were expected to bring their own food and bedding.

==== Combine ====
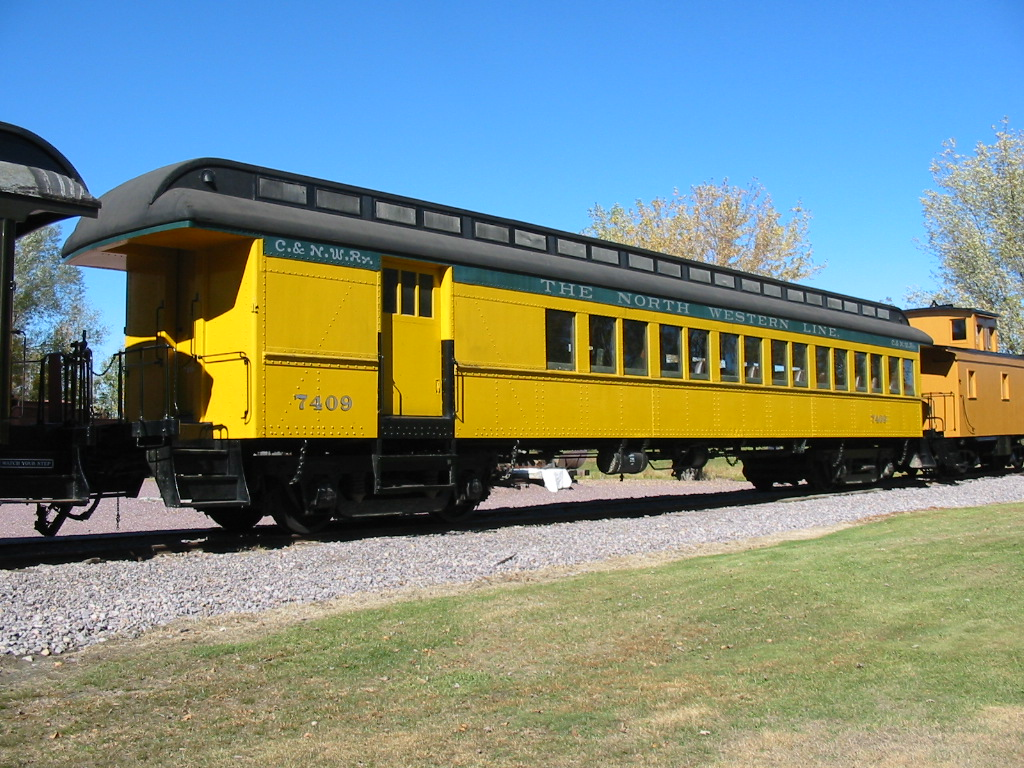
A coach-baggage combine

A combine is a car that combines features of a head-end and a regular passenger car. The most common combination is that of a coach and a baggage car, but the combination of coach and post office car was also common. Combines were used most frequently on branch lines and short line railroads where there wasn't necessarily enough traffic to justify single-purpose cars economically. As lightweight cars began to appear on railroads, passenger cars increasingly combined features of two or more car types into a single car, and the classic heavyweight combine fell out of use.

==== Control car (cab) ====
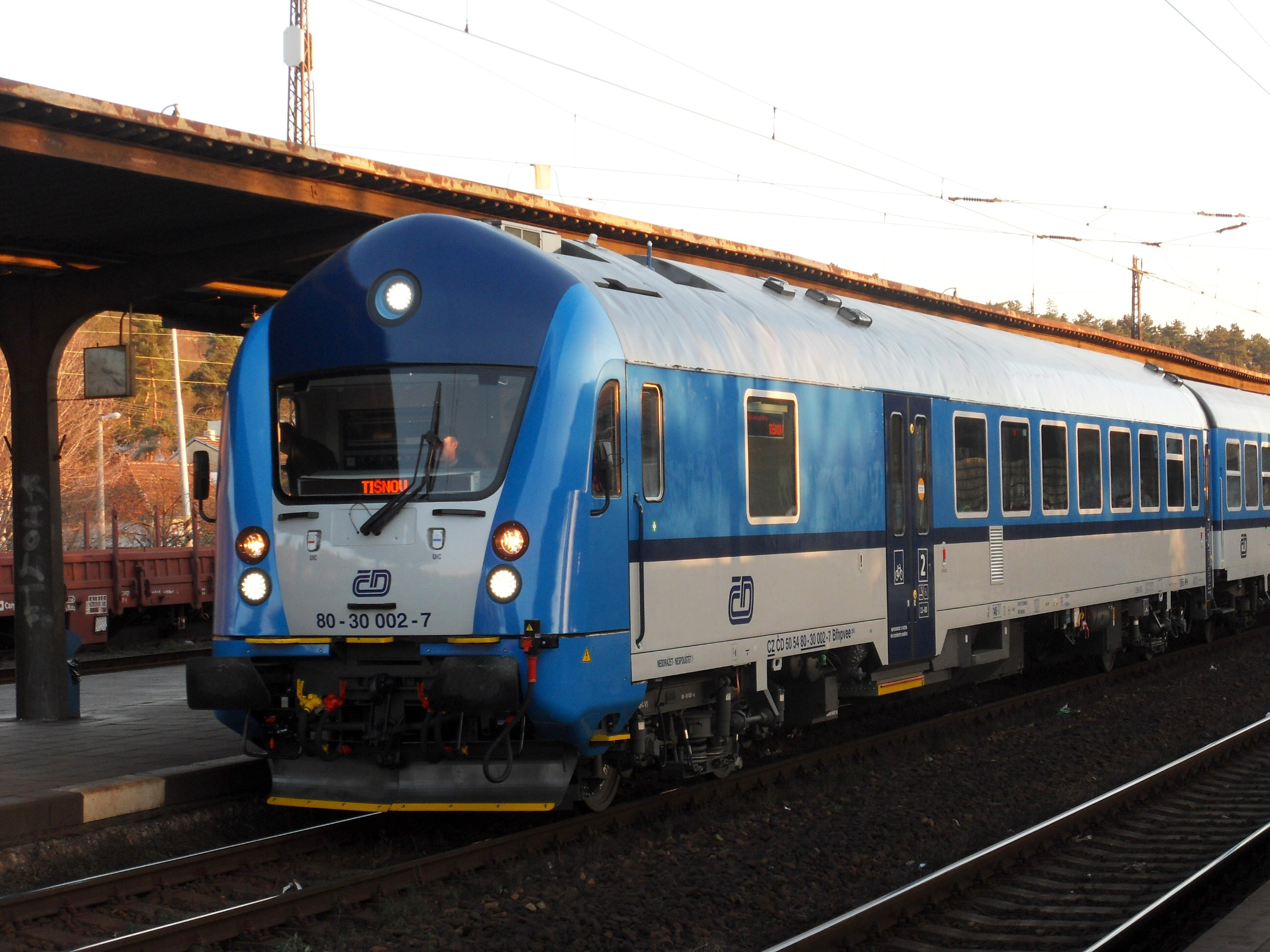
A driving trailer in Czech Republic

A control car (also known as a Driving Trailer in Europe and the UK) is a passenger car that allows the train to be run in reverse with the locomotive at the rear. It is common on commuter trains in the US, Canada, and Europe. This can be important for serving small towns without extensive switching facilities, end-of-train stations, and dead-end lines, and for fast turnaround when changing directions in commuter service.

==== Dome car ====
A dome car can include features of a coach car, a sleeping car, a lounge car, a dining car, and an observation car. Within the United States, the primary manufacturers were The Budd Company (stainless steel construction), The Pullman Company (steel construction), and ACF (American Car & Foundry, aluminum construction). A portion of the car, usually in the center, is split into two levels, with stairs leading up and down to the train's regular passenger car floor. The lower level of the dome usually consisted of a small lounge area, while the upper portion was usually coach or lounge seating within a "bubble" of glass on the car's roof. Budd Co. dome cars used curved glass, whereas Pullman company cars used flat panels of glass that were positioned at different angles above the roofline. Passengers in the upper portion of the dome were able to see in all directions from a vantage point above the train's roof line. On some dome cars, the lower portion was built as a galley, where car attendants used dumbwaiters to transfer items between the galley and a dining area in the car's dome. In the United States, the Union Pacific Railroad was the primary user of dome dining cars in the pre-Amtrak era.

Some dome cars were built with the dome extending the entire length of the car (a "full dome" car), while others had only a small observation bubble. There were also combination dome-observation cars built, intended to be the last car on the train, with both a rear observation and a dome on top. Dome observation cars came in both round-end and square-end versions. The Union Pacific in the US was the primary user of square-end observation cars before Amtrak, although the Burlington Route had several stainless-steel square-end cars.

==== Double-decker or bilevel coach ====
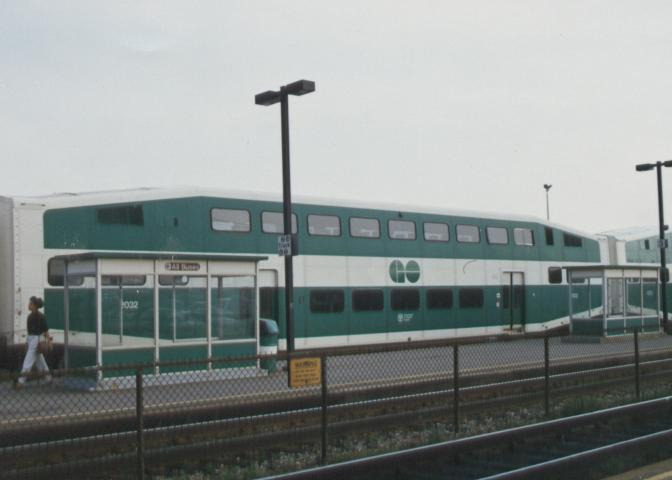
A Bombardier BiLevel Coach

As passenger car construction improved to the point where dome cars were introduced, some passenger car manufacturers began building double decker passenger train cars for use in areas that are more heavily populated or to carry more passengers over a long distance while using fewer cars (such as Amtrak's Superliner cars). Cars used on long-distance passenger trains could combine features of any of the basic car types, while cars used in local commuter service are often strictly coach types on both levels.

Double-decker coaches were tried in the UK (SR Class 4DD), but the experiment was unsuccessful because the restricted British loading gauge resulted in cramped conditions.

==== Drovers' car ====
Drovers' cars were used on long-distance livestock trains in the western United States. The purpose of a drover's car was to accommodate the livestock's handlers on the journey between the ranch and the processing plant. They were usually older, shorter cars equipped with stove heaters, as no trainline steam heating was provided.

==== Hospital car ====
A variety of hospital trains operate around the world, equipped with specialist carriages that serve as hospital wards, treatment rooms, and full-scale operating theaters (US: operating rooms).

==== Private car ====
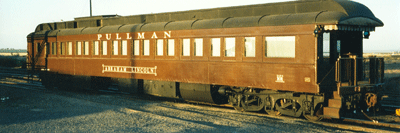
A heavyweight Pullman "business car"

Many cars built by Pullman and other companies were either originally built or later converted for use as business and private cars, which served as the "private jet" of the early-to-mid-20th century. They were used by railroad officials and dignitaries as business cars, and by wealthy individuals for travel and entertainment. There are various configurations, but the cars generally have an observation platform and include a full kitchen, dining room, state rooms, a secretary's room, an observation room, and often servants' quarters. A number of these private cars have survived the decades, and some are used for tours, private event rentals, etc. A small number of private cars (along with other types of passenger cars), have been upgraded to meet current Amtrak regulations, and may be chartered by their owners for private travel attached to Amtrak trains.

The only current example in Britain is the British Royal Train.

==== Troop sleeper ====
A "troop sleeper" was a railroad passenger car constructed to serve as a mobile barracks (essentially, a sleeping car) for transporting troops over distances sufficient to require overnight accommodations. This method allowed part of the trip to be made overnight, reducing the amount of transit time required and increasing travel efficiency. Troop kitchens, rolling galleys, also joined the consist to provide meal service en route (the troops took their meals in their seats or bunks). Troop hospital cars, also based on the troop sleeper carbody, transported wounded servicemen and typically travelled in solid strings on special trains averaging fifteen cars each.

=== Car technology ===
Passenger cars are almost as old as railroading itself, and their development paralleled that of freight cars. Early two-axle cars gave way to conventional two-truck construction, with the car floor riding above the wheels; link-and-pin couplers gave way to automatic types.

Several construction details characterized passenger equipment. Passenger trains were expected to run at higher speeds than freight trains, and therefore, passenger trains evolved to provide a superior ride and better tracking at those speeds. Over time, in most cases, provision was made for passengers and train staff to move from car to car; therefore, platforms and later vestibules were used to bridge the gap.

In later years, several changes to this basic form were introduced to improve speed, comfort, and cost.

==== Articulated ====
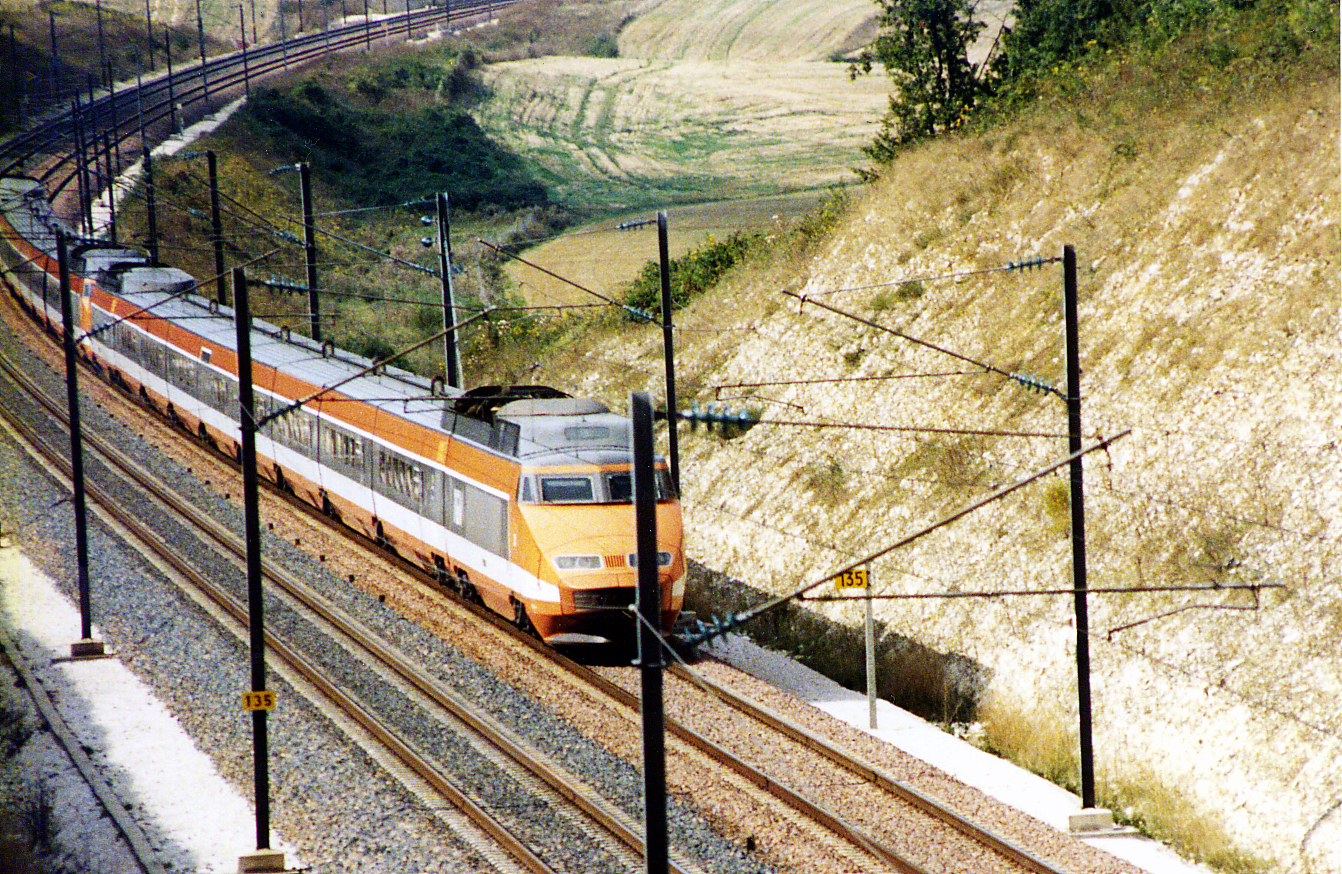
Two TGVs (coupled) with articulated trainsets

Articulated passenger cars are becoming increasingly common in Europe and the US. This means that the passenger cars share trucks and that the passageways between them are more or less permanently attached. The cars are kept in "trainsets" and not split up during normal operations.

Articulated cars have several advantages. They reduce the total number of wheels and trucks, lowering costs and maintenance expenses. Further, movement between cars is safer and easier than with traditional designs. Finally, it is possible to implement tilting schemes such as the Talgo design, which allows the train to lean into curves. The chief disadvantage is that failure of a single car disables the entire set, since individual cars cannot be readily switched in and out of the consist.

==== Low-floor ====
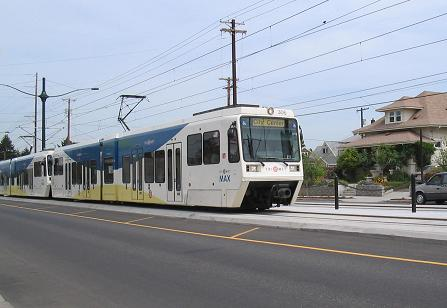
Siemens light rail vehicle (articulated, low-floor) in Portland, Oregon

In some countries (such as the US), the platform level may be below the floor of passenger cars, resulting in a significant step up, which slows boarding times and is important for high-capacity systems. Low-floor cars have their main passenger and loading floors directly level with the loading platform, rather than having a step up to the passenger compartment, as was traditional until around the 1970s. This is achieved by using a low-slung chassis with the "low floor" resting between the trucks, rather than resting completely on top, as in a simpler straight-chassis design. This improved design is seen in many passenger cars today, especially double-decker cars. The low floor enables easy access for bicycles, strollers, suitcases, wheelchairs, and those with disabilities, which is otherwise not always convenient or even possible with the traditional passenger car design.

Within the United States, the Pennsylvania Railroad developed 'The Keystone' 7-car set of cars with their own attached (head-end) power car in the late 1950s. It was mostly used between New York City and Washington, DC. Boarding was at the normal platform level, at the end of the cars, with the centre section between the trucks lowered to give the cars a lower centre of gravity and higher speed capability.

==== Self-propelled passenger equipment ====
These vehicles usually carry motive power in each unit. Trams, light rail vehicles, and subways have been widely constructed in urban areas worldwide since the late 19th century. By the year 1900, electric-powered passenger cars were ubiquitous in the developed world. Still, they fell into decline after World War II, especially in the U.S. By 2000, they had regained popularity, and modern lines were being rebuilt where they had been torn up only 40 years earlier to make way for automobiles.

On lightly trafficked rural railways, powered diesel cars (such as the Budd Rail Diesel Car) remain popular. In Germany, the new Talent design shows that the diesel-powered passenger car is still a viable part of rail service. In the UK, locomotive-hauled passenger trains have largely been replaced by diesel multiple units and electric multiple units, such as the Bombardier Voyager family and the Hitachi A-Train AT300 family, even on express services.

==== Tilting ====
These cars can tilt to counteract inertia during turns, making the ride more comfortable for passengers. Amtrak has adopted Talgo trainsets for its Amtrak Cascades service in the Pacific Northwest. Other manufacturers have also implemented tilting designs. The British Rail Class 390 is a tilting train operating in the UK.

== Lighting, heating, air-conditioning ==
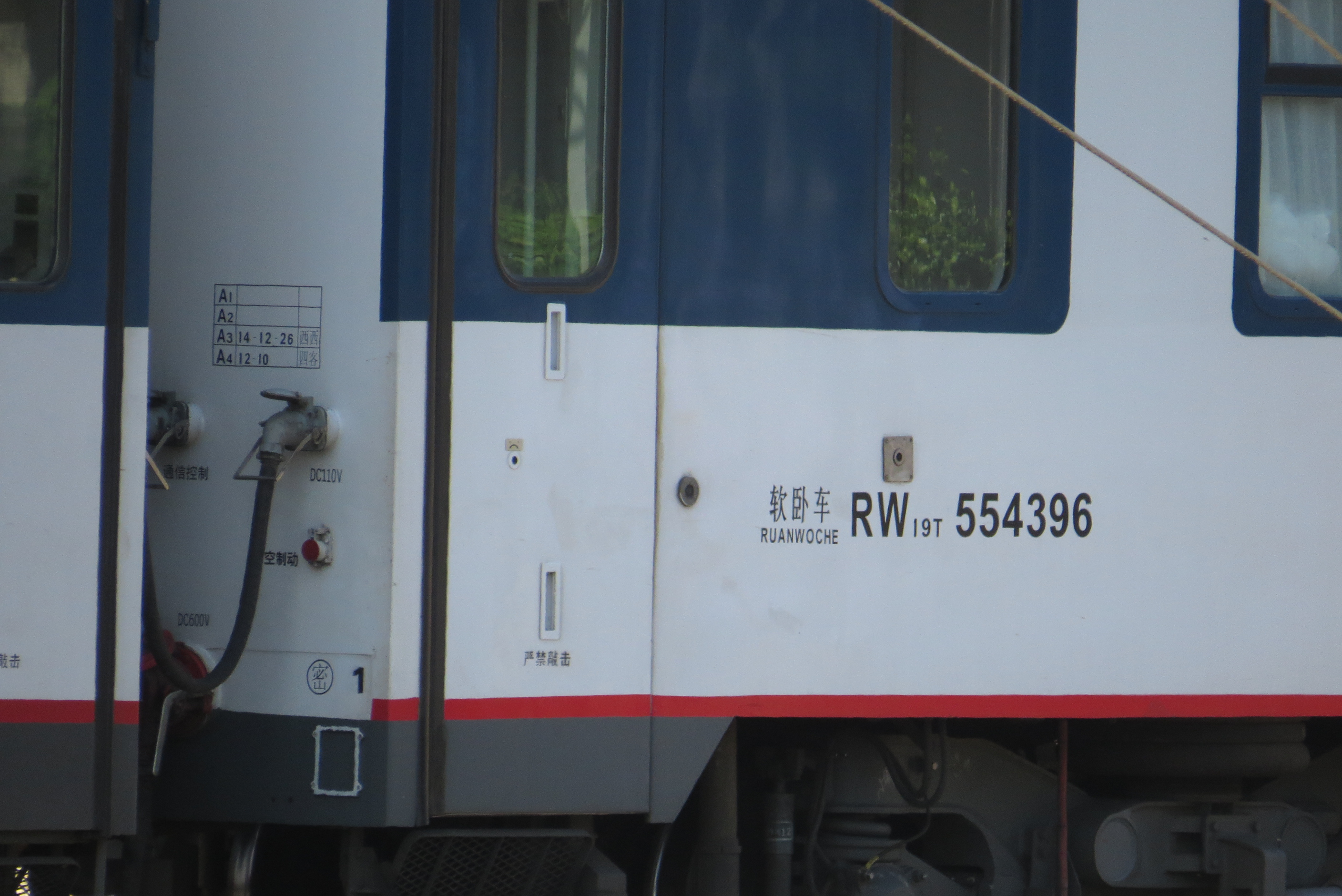
The electrical connection cables on a sleeper car in China

The earliest form of train lighting was provided by Colza oil lamps. The next stage was gas lighting, using compressed gas stored in cylinders under the coaches. Finally, electric lighting was introduced.

Early railway coaches had no heating, but passengers could rent foot-warmers. These worked on the same principle as modern sodium acetate heating pads. Later, steam heating was introduced, using steam supplied by the steam locomotive. Steam heating continued into the diesel locomotive era, with steam supplied by a steam generator. Now, electric heating is almost universal and air-conditioning is often provided as well. In the case of diesel multiple units, the coaches may be heated by waste heat from the engines, as in an automobile.

In a subway car, tram, or train, an insulator at a track switch may cut off power from the car for a few feet along the line and use a large capacitor to store energy to drive the subway car through the gap in the power feed.

== See also ==
- First class travel
- Parlor car
- Passenger train toilet

== Bibliography ==
- Broggie, Michael (2014), Walt Disney's Railroad Story: The Small-Scale Fascination That Led to a Full-Scale Kingdom (4th ed.), The Donning Company Publishers, ISBN 978-1-57864-914-3
- Ellis, Hamilton (1968). The pictorial encyclopedia of railways. Hamlyn Publishing Group. ISBN 0-600-03075-X.
- Kratville, William W. (1962). Steam Steel and Limiteds. A Saga of the Great Varnish Era. Omaha, NE: Barnhart Press. OCLC 1301983.
- Mencken, August (2000) [1957]. The railroad passenger car: An illustrated history of the first hundred years with accounts by contemporary passengers. Johns Hopkins University Press, Baltimore, MD. ISBN 0-8018-6541-7.
- Welsh, Joe (2005). "New deal for rail travel". Classic Trains Special Edition. No. 3, Streamliner Pioneers. pp. 8–17. ISSN 1541-809X.
- White, John H. (1985) [1978]. The American Railroad Passenger Car. Vol. 1. Baltimore, Maryland: Johns Hopkins University Press. ISBN 978-0-8018-2722-8.
- White, John H. (1985) [1978]. The American Railroad Passenger Car. Vol. 2. Baltimore, Maryland: Johns Hopkins University Press. ISBN 978-0-8018-2747-1.
