= Jackson White =

Jackson White may also refer to:

- Jackson White (actor) (born 1996), American actor
- Ramapough Mountain Indians, at times referred to pejoratively as "Jackson Whites"

== See also ==
- Jack White (disambiguation)
- John White (disambiguation)
