= Elizabeth Tone Summers =

American graphic artist (1929–2021)

A young Elizabeth Tone Summers smiles while creating art in the early 1950s. Photo credit: Queens Village photographers, Railroad Magazine courtesy White River Productions.

Elizabeth Tone Summers (February 4, 1929 - April 6, 2021) was a graphic artist who served as cover artist and later art editor for the Railway and Locomotive Historical Society's (R&LHS) Railroad History (Bulletin) for forty-four years, in addition to having her illustrations grace the covers of books, magazines, and a record album. Tone Summers illustrated the cover of The John Bull: 150 Years a Locomotive by John H. White, Jr. in 1981. The Smithsonian's National Museum of American History has this painting in their holdings. Technical drawings and illustrations created by Tone Summers can also be found at the California State Railroad Museum Library and Archives in Sacramento, California.

== Early life ==
Elizabeth Ann Tone was born on February 4, 1929, in New Haven, Connecticut to Mae Tone and John C. Tone Sr. An uncle, Joe Tone, and other relatives, including her father for a time, worked for the east coast railroad industry. Tone Summers and her younger brother, Jack Tone Jr., were rail fans who read train magazines and went on train enthusiast excursions. The family moved to Massachusetts in the 1940s where Tone Summers, in her early twenties, began sketching and learning how to illustrate locomotives by spending time in Boston & Albany rail yards closely analyzing the engines and gaining insights from engineers and firemen.

== Education ==
Tone Summers earned a Bachelor of Arts degree in 1947 from New Haven State Teachers College, now known as Southern Connecticut State University. In 1950, she graduated from Vesper George School of Art in Boston, Massachusetts.

== Railway and Locomotive Historical Society ==
Cover of John H. White's 1981 book The John Bull: 150 Years a Locomotive. White contracted Tone Summers to create the watercolor for the cover art. White worked as the chief transportation curator at the Smithsonian at the time and this piece is housed at the Smithsonian Institution's National Museum of American History. Tone Summers captured the John Bull traveling on the Camden & Amboy Railroad during its 35 years of service on the rails from 1831 to 1866

In 1949, Tone Summers met R&LHS founder and president Charles E. Fisher while selling her locomotive-themed Christmas cards she silk-screened herself in her attic. Impressed by her artistic abilities and commitment to accuracy and precision when drawing locomotives, he contracted her to create cover art for R&LHS Bulletin no. 92 in April 1955, She contributed multiple pieces to serve as cover art for the peer-reviewed journal and would assume the role of art editor in 1965, a position she shared with railroad industry engineer, designer, and artist Otto Kuhler until the spring of 1970. She was the sole art editor of the Bulletin from fall 1970 to fall 1999.

== Career ==
Tone Summers's graphics career spanned seven decades. Her illustrations can also be found on the covers of railroad-themed books, magazines, and a record album.

Tone Summers illustrated the cover of The John Bull: 150 Years a Locomotive by John H. White, Jr. in 1981. The Smithsonian's National Museum of American History has this painting in its holdings. Many illustrations created by Tone Summers can be found at the California State Railroad Museum Library and Archives in Sacramento, California, housed in the R&LHS Graphic Materials collection. The finding aid for this collection can be found on the Online Archive of California.

== Cover art ==
- R&LHS Bulletin no. 92 April 1955
- R&LHS Bulletin no. 93 October 1955
- R&LHS Bulletin no. 95 October 1956
- R&LHS Bulletin no. 96 May 1957
- R&LHS Bulletin no. 99 October 1958
- R&LHS Bulletin no. 108 April 1963
- R&LHS Bulletin no. 109 October 1963
- R&LHS Bulletin no. 110 April 1964
- R&LHS Bulletin no. 112 April 1965
- R&LHS Bulletin no. 113 October 1965
- R&LHS Bulletin no. 114 April 1966
- R&LHS Bulletin no. 117 October 1967
- R&LHS Bulletin no. 118 April 1968
- R&LHS Bulletin no. 119 October 1968
- R&LHS Bulletin no. 120 April 1969
- R&LHS Bulletin no. 122 April 1970
- R&LHS Bulletin no. 124 April 1971
- R&LHS Bulletin no. 125 October 1971
- R&LHS Bulletin no. 126 April 1972
- R&LHS Railroad History no. 128 Spring 1973
- R&LHS Railroad History no. 129 Autumn 1973
- R&LHS Railroad History no. 131 Autumn 1974
- R&LHS Railroad History no. 144 Spring 1981
- R&LHS Railroad History no. 151 Autumn 1984
- R&LHS Railroad History no. 155 Autumn 1986
- The John Bull, 150 years a locomotive by John H. White, 1981
- R&LHS Railroad History no. 157 Autumn 1987
- R&LHS Railroad History no. 162 Spring 1990
- R&LHS Railroad History no. 173 Autumn 1995
- The Pascack Valley Line by Wilson E. Jones, 1996
- R&LHS Railroad History no. 178 Spring 1998
- Songs of the Railroad, Merril Jay Singers, 2011
- Railroad Magazine, August 1958
- Railroad Magazine, June 1967
- Railroad Magazine, January 1968

== Personal life ==
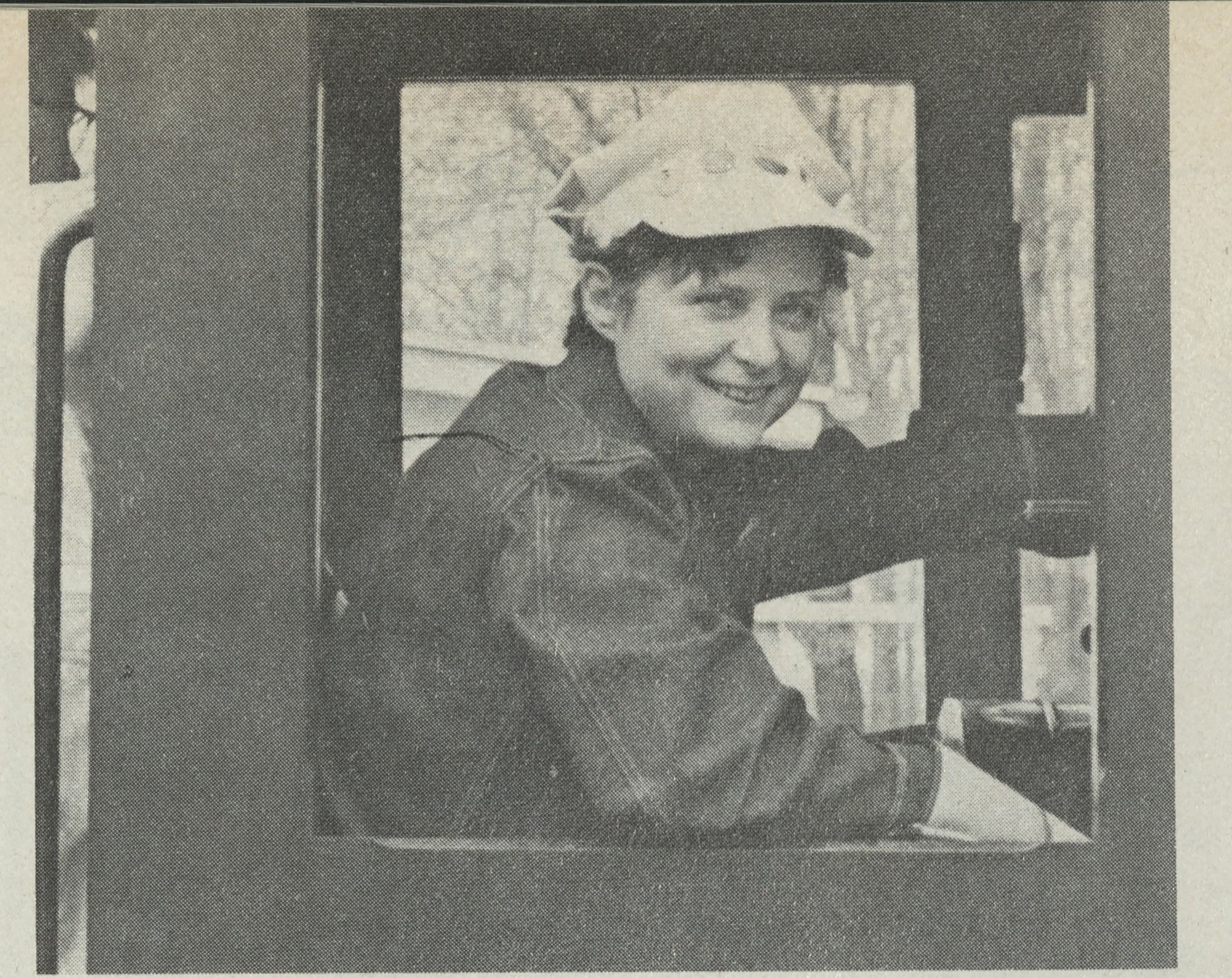
A young Tone Summers sits in the cab of a locomotive. Photo credit: Queens Village photographers, Railroad Magazine courtesy White River Productions.

Tone Summers had one brother, Jack Tone. Tone Summers married fellow rail fan and printer Herbert E. Summers in 1955. Herb Summers died in 1967. Tone Summers died April 6, 2021, at 92 in Wallkill, Orange County, New York.

== Memberships ==
- Railway and Locomotive Historical Society - 1952 - 2021
- Electric Railroaders Association - 1972 - 2012
- Steamboat Historical Society - ca. 1975
