= Johnny White =

Johnny White may refer to:

- Johnny White (racing driver, born 1932), American
- Johnny White (racing driver, born 1985), American
- Johnny White (American football) (born 1988), American football running back
- Johnnie White (died 2007), staff officer of the Official Irish Republican Army

== See also ==
- John White (disambiguation)
- Johnny White's, a bar in New Orleans
