= John Wight =

John Wight may refer to:

- John Wight (footballer) (born 1973), Scottish footballer
- Sean Wight (John Phillip Wight, 1964–2011), Australian rules footballer
- John Wight, contributor to London Progressive Journal

== See also ==
- John White (disambiguation)
