= Gene White =

Gene White may refer to:

- Gene White (basketball) (fl. 1950s), American basketball player and teacher
- Gene White (American football) (1932–2017), American football player

== See also ==
- Eugene White (fl. 1930s), American baseball player
- Jean White (disambiguation)
