= John Baker White =

John Baker White may refer to:

- John Baker White (clerk of court) (1794–1862), American military officer, lawyer, court clerk, and civil servant
- John Baker White (West Virginia politician) (1868–1944), American military officer, lawyer, and politician in West Virginia
- John Baker White (British politician) (1902–1988), British politician

== See also ==
- John Baker (disambiguation)
- John White (disambiguation)
- White (surname)
