= Nathaniel Mehr =

British journalist

Nathaniel Mehr is a leftwing British journalist whose has written for several publications including The Morning Star newspaper and Tribune magazine and Red Pepper.

From 2008 to 2010 Mehr was co-editor of the London Progressive Journal, an online current affairs magazine. His first book, Constructive Bloodbath in Indonesia: The US, Britain and the Mass Killings of 1965-66, was published by Spokesman Books in May 2009. In January 2011, Spokesman Books published a new edition of J.A. Hobson's seminal work, Imperialism: A Study, which featured a new introduction by Nathaniel Mehr. Nathaniel Mehr is currently an associate editor of Review 31, an online literary magazine that was launched in October 2011.
