= Jack White (priest) =

Archdeacon of Madras (1944–1948)

Jack White was an Anglican Archdeacon in India in the mid 20th century.

White trained at Bishop Wilson Theological College, Isle of Man and was ordained in 1927. After curacies at Malew, Rushen and Douglas he went out to India with the Eccles Establishment. He served at Bangalore, Bombay, Trimulgherry, Ootacamund and Madras, where he was Archdeacon from 1944 to 1948.
