= Jean Whyte =

Australian librarian (1923–2003)

Jean Whyte AM (1923–2003) was the foundation professor of the Graduate School of Librarianship at Monash University. She has been referred to as "a leading member of the library profession in Australia".

== Life and career ==
Jean Primrose Whyte was born in Adelaide, South Australia on 27 June 1923. Her parents were Ernest Primrose (Prim) Whyte and Kitty Macully and she spent the first ten years of her life on a sheep station north of Port Augusta, South Australia.

After studying St Peter's Collegiate Girls' School in Adelaide, despite parental opposition who "did not believe in higher education for girls", she stayed in Adelaide at the end of her high school studies and began working in the Public Library of South Australia (now known as the State Library of South Australia) while studying part time at the University of Adelaide. In 1951 she graduated with first class honours in English and the John Howard Clark Prize for her first.

She occupied increasingly senior positions at the State Library of South Australia until 1958. During that period she was awarded a Fulbright Grant to study graduate librarianship at the University of Chicago.

During the years 1959-1972 she worked in Sydney University's Fisher Library, where in 1966 she was appointed as the Associate Librarian (Reader Services). In 1972 she moved to the National Library of Australia, Canberra where she became the Director of Information Resources and Services.

In 1975 she was appointed as the foundation professor of Monash University's Graduate School of Librarianship (now part of the Caulfield School of Information Technology), which under her tutelage developed as a leading Australian school in library and information science and one known for its scholarship and research. She set up "master’s courses in librarianship, archives and records" and "a strong PhD and master’s by research program", and Monash's research expertise in the same fields.

Over the years she worked closely with the Library Association of Australia, and in particular its Board of Education, and edited the Association's Australian Library Journal for more than a decade.

In 1988 she retired from Monash as a professor emeritus and in the years 1981-1987 she served as a member of the Council of the National Library of Australia.

== Final years ==
Whyte died in Melbourne, Victoria on 18 March 2003.

== Whyte Fund ==
Following "generous bequests" by Jean Whyte and her sister Phyllis, the Whyte Fund was set up to support "research and education into librarianship, archives and records" at Monash University.

== Awards and honours ==
- 1963: Library Association of Australia Fellowship
- 1987: H. C. L. Anderson Award
- 1988: Member of the Order of Australia "for service to education particularly in the field of librarianship"
- 1996: Honorary D.Litt. from Monash University

== Bibliography ==
- Jean Whyte, Margaret Isaacs and Linda Emmett, Libraries and Australian Literature: A Report on the Representation of Australian Creative Writing in Australian Libraries. Melbourne, Victoria: The Ancora Press, Monash University, 1988.
- Jean Whyte and David J. Jones, Uniting a profession; The Australian Institute of Librarians, 1937–1949. Kingston, ACT, Australian Library and Information Association, 2007.
