= Jean White (physician) =

First female flying doctor in Australia

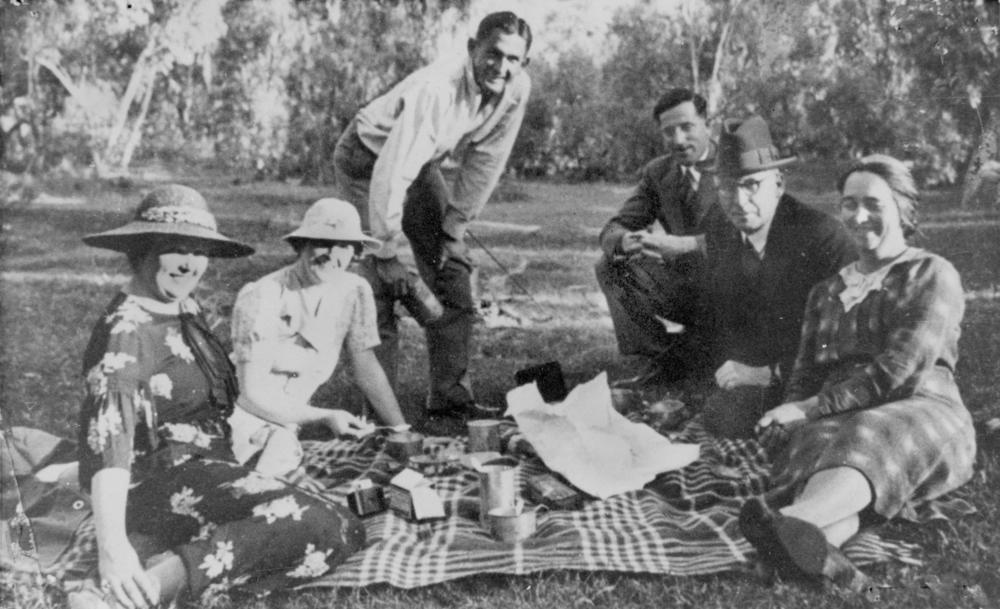
StateLibQld 2 185175 Members of the Royal Flying Doctor Service and friends picnicking at Cloncurry, 1937

Salome Jean White (1905 – 15 July 1974) was the first female flying medical doctor in Australia and the world when she commenced work with the Australian Inland Mission in May 1937. She was known as the Guardian Angel of the Gulf.

== Early life and education ==
Salome Jean White was born in 1905. Her parents were John White (died 26 January 1935), a school teacher, and Salome White (née Williams) (died 15 June 1951) of 32 Havelock Road, Hawthorn. The family also owned a farm near Ballarat. She was the elder sister to John George Glyn White CBE (9 April 1909 – 2 November 1987) and Mary Margaret Freda White (later Guest), both of whom were also doctors.

White attended Melbourne High School and received a scholarship to attend University of Melbourne, where she graduated in 1929 with a Bachelor of Medicine, Bachelor of Surgery.

== Career ==
She worked at the Royal Melbourne Hospital, Adelaide Children's Hospital, Crown Street Women's Hospital and Caulfield Convalescent Hospital before responding to an advertisement for doctors to work in remote areas of Australia.

She undertook four months of training at Cloncurry before being based with one nurse at Normanton. Together, with a pilot flying an aircraft donated by Qantas, they offered a seven-day aerial medical service covering 65,000 square miles of the Gulf Country. From September 1938, White was also supervising a newly opened nursing hospital at Dunbar Station.
