= Lawrence Chesterfield Bryant =

Lawrence Chesterfield Bryant (February 16, 1916 – June 8, 2010) was a professor, principal, pastor, and author. He wrote two books on South Carolina's 19th and early 20th century African American legislators. He was awarded the South Carolina Silver Crescent Award in 2005 for his research and work as an educator. Duke University has an extensive collection of his papers.

Bryant was born in Nash County, North Carolina. His parents were Emmitt Bryant and Hattie Cooper. He was one of 12 children.

He graduated from Shaw University in 1940 with a B.S. in biology and chemistry. He studied at Howard University from 1947 until 1950, receiving a Bachelor of Divinity degree. In 1951 he received an M.A. from New York University.

He applied to teach education at the College of William and Mary in 1956. His application notes several papers he wrote, five years of teaching in Washington D.C. public schools and a year as principal of Augusta County Training School.

He received a doctorate in education from the University of Virginia in 1959. He taught at Virginia Theological Seminary and College in Lynchburg, Virginia. Was a professor of education at Jackson College in Jackson, Mississippi. Was a dean and professor of education at Florida Memorial College. He was a professor of education at South Carolina State University from 1960 until 1986.

He was pastor at First Baptist Church in Harrisburg, Virginia.

In 2005 he was presented the Silver Crescent Award by state representative Gilda Cobb-Hunter on behalf of South Carolina governor Mark Sanford. Sanford's letter accompanying the award praised Bryant's work as an educator, his genealogical research that helped "many people throughout South Carolina trace their family roots and history", and his "historical reports about South Carolina, her leaders and her history."

Ila Thomas Bryant was his wife. They had two children and three grandsons.

== Bibliography ==
- A guidance handbook of junior and senior colleges in Mississippi Florida Normal & Industrial Memorial College (1957)
- Negro Legislators in South Carolina 1868-1902 School of Graduate Studies, South Carolina State College (1967), preceded by a preliminary report (1966)
- A Historical and Genealogical Record of Lawrence Bryant and Pattie Sessoms' Five Other Sons of Nash County, North Carolina (1968)
- Autobiography of Lawrence C. Bryant (1971)
- "The Origin of the Founding of African-American Colleges of the United States
- South Carolina Negro Legislators: A Glorious Success
- "The Status of Music in the Negro High Schools of South Carolina" written with John Henry Deloach (July 1, 1964)
