= London Progressive Journal =

London Progressive Journal (LPJ) is a UK-based weekly online magazine covering domestic and international current affairs from a politically left perspective. The magazine features regular contributions from a number of journalists as well as reports from independent campaign groups.

== History ==
Since its inception in January 2008, the magazine has featured interviews with prominent activists, writers, journalists and politicians, including John McDonnell, John Pilger, Howard Zinn, Mordechai Vanunu, Antonio Navarro Wolff, Ilan Pappe and Malalai Joya. It has been especially prolific on Latin American issues and has published articles by George Monbiot, Peter Tatchell, Emmeline Ravilious, Ramzy Baroud, Dr Tomasz Pierscionek, Felix McHugh, Patrizia Bertini, John Wight, W. Stephen Gilbert and James Suggett, among others. Its reporting has increasingly been cited in academic writing.

The magazine is not linked with any political party.

From 2008 to 2011 Nathaniel Mehr was the editor of LPJ. Since June 2011 Tomasz Pierscionek and Emmeline Ravilious have been editing the magazine.
