= Jack White (cricketer, born 1893) =

English cricketer

Personal information
- Full name: Jack White
- Born: 9 July 1893; Putney, London, England
- Died: 6 November 1968 (aged 75); East Grinstead, Sussex, England
- Batting: Right-handed
- Bowling: Right-arm fast

Domestic team information
- Years: Team
- 1926: Surrey
- 1913–1914: Cambridge University

Career statistics
Competition	First-class
Matches	3
Runs scored	26
Batting average	13.00
100s/50s	–/–
Top score	15*
Balls bowled	487
Wickets	6
Bowling average	48.16
5 wickets in innings	1
10 wickets in match	–
Best bowling	5/75
Catches/stumpings	3/–
- Source: Cricinfo, 21 July 2013

Jack White (9 July 1893 – 6 November 1968) was an English cricketer. White was a right-handed batsman who bowled right-arm fast. He was born at Putney, London.

While studying at the University of Cambridge, White played two first-class matches for the university cricket club, both against Yorkshire at Fenner's in 1913 and 1914. In his first match he took what would be his only first-class five wicket haul with figures of 5/75 in Yorkshire's first-innings of the match. He later played a single first-class match for Surrey against Oxford University at The Oval in 1926, though without success.

He died at East Grinstead, Sussex on 6 November 1968.
