= John Whyte =

John Whyte may refer to:

- John Whyte (pastoralist) (c. 1826–1902), pastoralist and grocer in Whyte, Counsell & Co. in South Australia
- John Whyte (politician) (1838–1924), former merchant and politician in Quebec
- John B. Whyte (1928–2004), American model and real estate entrepreneur
- John Blair Whyte (1840–1914), member of parliament and mayor in the Waikato Region of New Zealand
- John Henry Whyte (1928–1990), Irish historian and political scientist
- John Whyte (died 1913), Scottish journalist, translator of Gaelic, and librarian, see Alexander Macbain
- John Whyte, a London entrepreneur who built the Kensington Hippodrome
- Jock Whyte (1921–1998), Scottish former footballer

== See also ==
- Jack Whyte (1940–2021), Scottish-Canadian novelist
- John Whyte-Melville-Skeffington, 13th Viscount Massereene (1914–1992), British politician and landowner
- John White (disambiguation)
