= John White (1748–1813) =

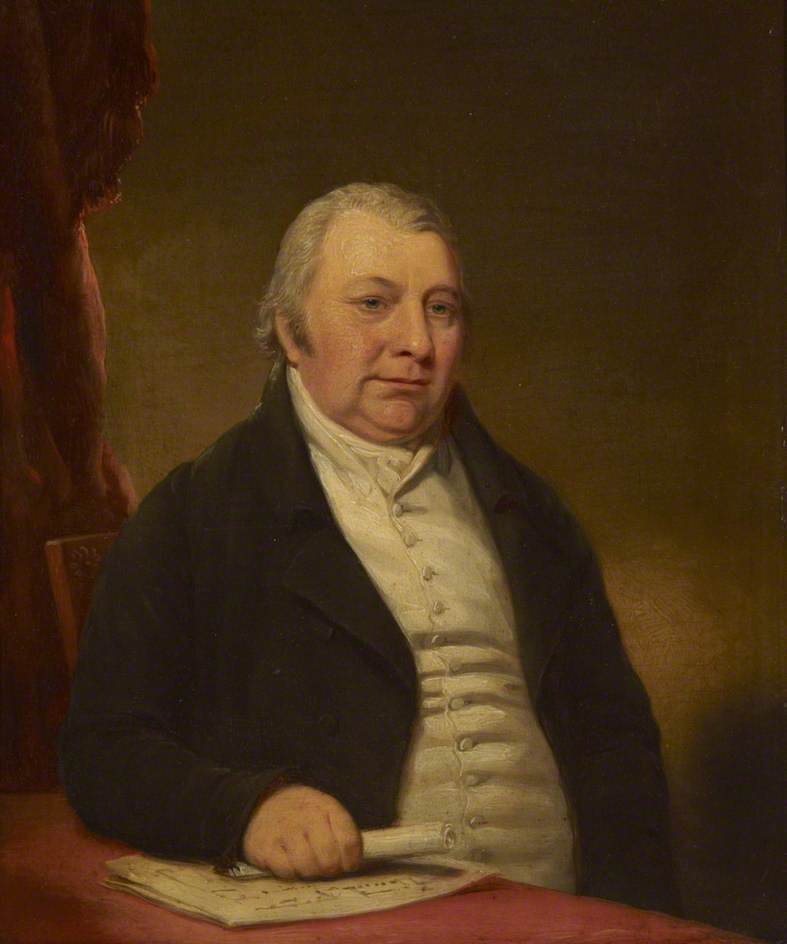
John White, oil on canvas, c. 1800. Victoria and Albert Museum, London.

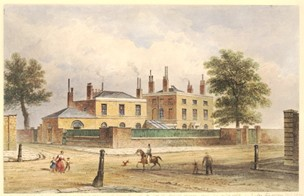
View of the house of John White, Thomas Hosmer Shepherd, 1850.

John White (1748–1813) was a property developer and surveyor to the Duke of Portland who was responsible for the development of the Duke's land in Marylebone, including Harley Street and what subsequently became Regent's Park.
