= John A. White (colonel) =

- Born: October 27, 1924 (age 102); Savannah, Georgia, U.S.
- Known for: Becoming first sworn-in African American police officer in Georgia
- Spouse: Sallie Catherine Williams (–1995; her death)
- Children: 5

John Alliston White (born October 27, 1924) is a former colonel in the United States Marine Corps, serving in World War II. He later worked for the Savannah Police Department (SPD), becoming the first sworn in African American officer in Georgia as one of "The Original Nine", the first nine black officers who worked for the SPD.

== Early life ==
John Alliston White Sr. was born in 1924 in Savannah, Georgia, to Bonapart White and Gussie Wright. His mother, a native of Alabama, was an archaeologist and civil-rights advocate. White's older brother, Benjamin, died in 1955 at the age of 74.

He graduated from Beach Cuyler High School and attended Georgia State College.

== Career ==
In 1943, White enlisted in the United States Marine Corps. He received training at Montford Point in North Carolina, before serving in World War II in the South Pacific as part of the 51st Defense Battalion, the first black combat unit. He was one of the first black marines in the country, after U.S. President Franklin Roosevelt signed Executive Order 8802 in 1941, prohibiting racial discrimination in defense programs.

After being honorably discharged in 1946, White became Georgia's first sworn in African American police officer when he joined the Savannah Police Department the following year. He was promoted to corporal in 1956, later attaining the rank of sergeant and, in an honorary promotion, lieutenant. He was assigned as Martin Luther King Jr.'s bodyguard when King visited Savannah. White retired in 1984.

White was a minister at Savannah's St. James African Methodist Episcopal Church.

== Personal life ==
White was married to Sallie Catherine Williams, with whom he had five children. She died in 1995, aged 69. In 2012, White and the other surviving marines from Montford Point received the Congressional Gold Medal.

=== Legacy ===
In 2021, Bouhan Street at Waters Avenue, in Savannah, where White has lived the entirety of his life, was renamed Lieutenant John White Avenue.
