= John White (footballer, born 1955) =

Australian rules footballer

Personal information
- Full name: John White
- Born: 28 July 1955 (age 71)
- Original team: Yarrawonga
- Height: 175 cm (5 ft 9 in)
- Weight: 80 kg (176 lb)

Playing career^{1}
| Years | Club | Games (Goals) |
| 1973 | North Melbourne | 1 (0) |
- ^{1} Playing statistics correct to the end of 1973.

John White (born 28 July 1955) is a former Australian rules footballer who played with North Melbourne in the Victorian Football League (VFL).
