= Jack White (footballer, born 1876) =

Australian rules footballer

Personal information
- Full name: John George White
- Born: 4 December 1876; Dunolly, Victoria
- Died: 21 April 1933 (aged 56); Melbourne, Victoria
- Original team: South Yarra

Playing career^{1}
Years	Club	Games (Goals)
1899–1900	St Kilda	6 (1)
- ^{1} Playing statistics correct to the end of 1900.

John George White (4 December 1876 – 21 April 1933) was an Australian rules footballer who played with St Kilda in the Victorian Football League (VFL).
