= John White (archdeacon of Meath) =

John White was a 15th-century Archdeacon in Ireland.

He was Archdeacon of Armagh from 1432 to 1449; and Archdeacon of Meath from 1450 to 1478.
