= John Hannibal White =

American politician (c.1828–1878)

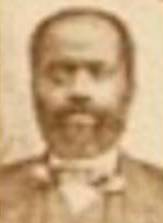
John Hannibal White

John Hannibal White (c. 1828 – July 26, 1878) was a delegate to South Carolina's 1868 Constitutional Convention, a two-term member of the South Carolina House of Representatives, and a state senator in South Carolina. He worked as a blacksmith.

White was enslaved.

During the Civil War he would read updates to members of his community in York County, South Carolina. A photograph of him was part of a composite image of African American "Radical Republican" members of the South Carolina Legislature.

== Additional reading ==
- South Carolina Negro Legislators: a Glorious Success: State and Local Officeholders; Biographies of Negro Representatives, 1868–1902 by Lawrence Chesterfield Bryant, South Carolina State College, 1974
- Biographical Directory of the South Carolina House of Representatives; Faunt, J.S.R. and Rector, R.E., with Bowden, D.K. Session lists, 1692–1973 by Walter B. Edgar, N. Louise Bailey, University of South Carolina Press, 1974
