= John White (major) =

Irish-American soldier (died 1777)

- Born: c. 1745; Ireland
- Died: October 1777 (aged c. 32)
- Allegiance: United States
- Service years: 1777
- Conflicts: American Revolutionary War Battle of Germantown (DOW)
- Spouse: Sarah Moore
- Children: Alexander, William, and John

Major John White (c. 1745 – October 1777) was a native Irish soldier in the American Revolutionary War. He died from a gunshot wound shortly after October 4, 1777, while acting as a volunteer aide under General John Sullivan during the Battle of Germantown. He was shot during the attempted burning of Chew House, also known as Cliveden.

White was a merchant prior to the war. In 1765 or 1766, he married Sarah Moore, daughter of Alexander Moore. Before her death on October 15, 1770, they had three children: Alexander, William, and John Moore White. He left his family and business in England in order to participate in the war.
