= Jack White (sports executive) =

American football executive (1913–1997)

- White in 1958

Profile
- Position: Center

Personal information
- Born: July 31, 1913; New Britain, Connecticut, U.S.
- Died: September 26, 1997 (aged 84); White City, Oregon, U.S.

Career information
- High school: New Haven High School (CT)
- College: Manhattan

Career history

Coaching
- New York Yankees (1946–1949) Assistant coach

Operations
- New York Yankees (1946–1949) Chief scout; San Francisco 49ers (1951–1964) Part-time scout; San Francisco 49ers (1965–1966) Scouting director; San Francisco 49ers (1967–1972) General manager; San Francisco 49ers (1973–1976) Vice president of player personnel

John Joseph White (July 31, 1913 – September 26, 1997) was an American sports executive. He served as the general manager for the San Francisco 49ers of the National Football League (NFL) from 1967 to 1972 and also worked with the New York Yankees of the All-America Football Conference (AAFC) as well as with the New York Yankees of Major League Baseball (MLB).

== Early life ==
White was born on July 31, 1913, in New Britain, Connecticut. He attended New Britain High School and later was an athlete at Manhattan College in New York, where he played football as a lineman. He graduated from Manhattan with a Bachelor of Science degree, and reportedly had a stint afterwards with the Philadelphia Eagles of the National Football League (NFL).

== Coaching and executive career ==
White worked with Gene Tunney for the athletic program at the United States Naval Academy during World War II. He joined the New York Yankees of the All-America Football Conference (AAFC) in 1946, serving as their assistant coach and chief scout. He remained with the team until the AAFC merged with the NFL in 1950.

Soon after, White joined the New York Yankees baseball team; he served for a time as general manager of their minor league affiliate, the Richmond Virginians, before receiving promotions to the role of ticket manager in the late 1950s and business manager in 1960. By 1963, his position had become "director of baseball scouts". He ultimately served with the Yankees for 25 years.

White also began working for the San Francisco 49ers of the NFL as a part-time scout in 1951. He was promoted to director of scouting in 1965, and two years later was named the team's general manager. He helped the team win their division three straight times from 1970 to 1972 as manager, before accepting a role as vice president of player personnel in 1973. He retired following the 1976 season.

The San Francisco Examiner writer Al Corona described White's football career: "He negotiated with all these guys. All the contracts went through Jack. The players liked him. He kept to himself mostly. He was just a nice guy and knew football well." 49ers executive Louis Spadia noted White was "one of the most experienced and able men in the game in the area of seeking out and evaluating football talent."

== Later life and death ==
White moved to Oregon after retiring and enjoyed raising horses. He was married and had two children. He died in White City, Oregon, on September 26, 1997, at the age of 84.
