= John White (photographer) =

British photographer and postcard publisher

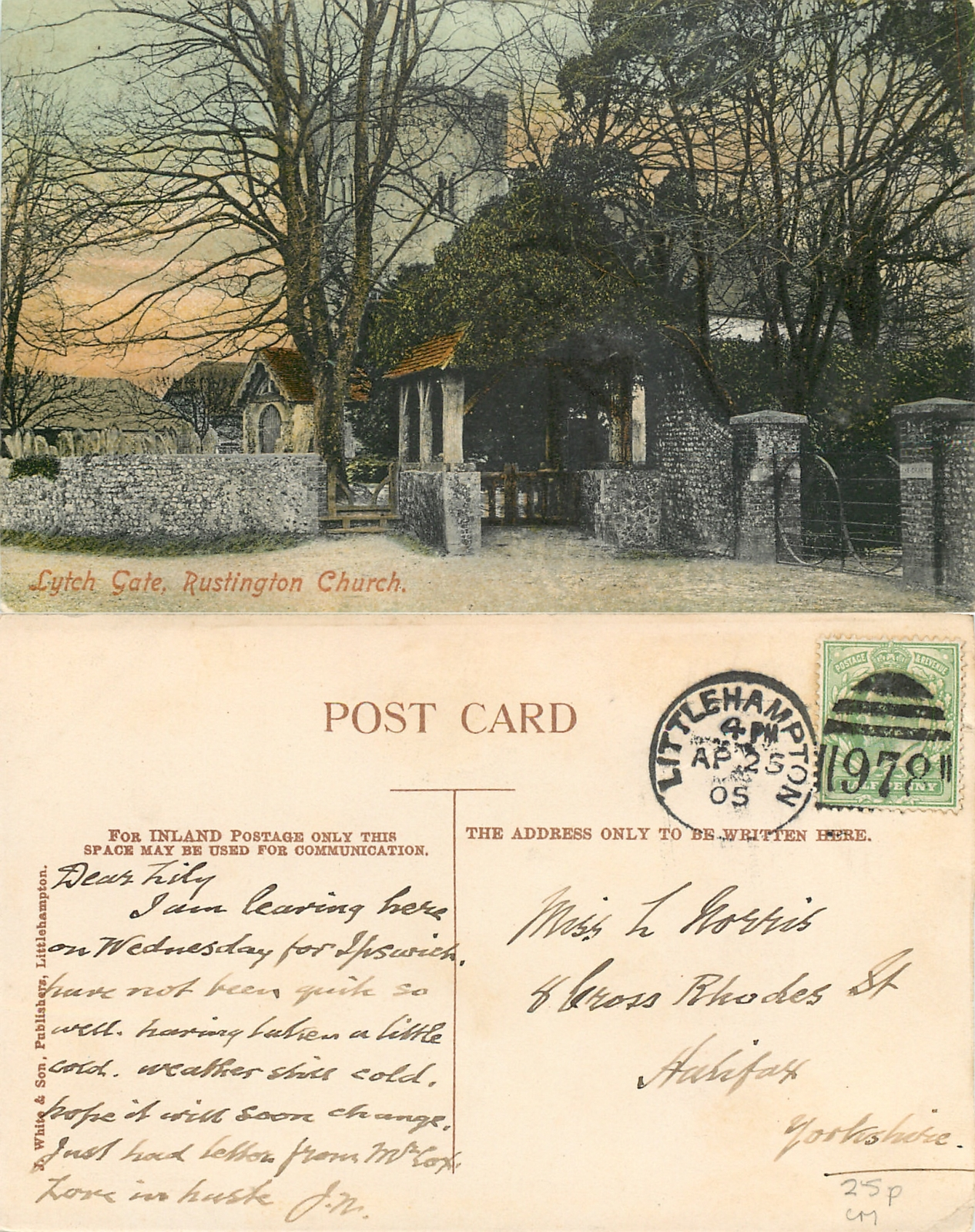
Lych Gate, Rustington Church, John White postcard, sent 1905

John White (1850–1932) was a British photographer and postcard publisher, and Littlehampton's leading photographer in the 1880s and 1890s. By 1903, he had taken his son Arthur Harold White into the business and was trading as J. White & Son.

== Early life ==
John White was born in Lyminster, Sussex in 1850, one of seven children of Thomas White, cattle dealer and drover, and his wife Betsy Cheal.

== Career ==
White set up a photographic studio at 11 River Road, Littlehampton, Sussex, in about 1874, with the money coming from "a monetary award that was made to him for his part in providing information which led to the apprehension of a smuggler". In June 1876, he relocated to 32 High Street, Littlehampton, and stayed there for more than twenty years.

By 1903, he had taken his son Arthur Harold White into the business and was trading as J. White & Son, and in 1904 was employing about a dozen people.

It is estimated that J. White & Son produced at least 2–3,000 different postcards.

== Personal life ==
On 20 July 1876, White married Alice Arnott, the daughter of Mary and Frederick Arnott, a London coachman from Shepherd's Bush.
