= Jon White (rugby union) =

Australian rugby union player (born 1935)

- Born: Jonathan Parker Laidley White; 27 February 1935 Wollongong, New South Wales

Rugby union career
- Position: Prop forward
Provincial / State sides
| Years | Team | Apps | (Points) |
- New South Wales
International career
| Years | Team | Apps | (Points) |
| 1958–65 | Wallabies | 24 | (0) |

Jonathan Parker Laidley White (born 27 February 1935) is an Australian former national representative rugby union player who made twenty-four Test appearances for his country between 1958 and 1965. He is regarded as one of Australia's finest rugby football players of the 20th century.

== Biography ==
White was born in Wollongong, but the family moved west to Cumnock and White commenced playing rugby union while boarding at The King's School, Parramatta. After leaving school he played with Yeoval club. White captained Central West against New Zealand and South African sides, and was selected for NSW Country.

He debuted as a Wallaby in 1958 against New Zealand, playing in the second row. For the rest of his Wallaby career he played loosehead prop, and played a significant role in the revival of Australian rugby which occurred in the 1960s.

Rugby historian Jack Pollard judged him "one of the finest forwards Australia has produced, a 187.5 cm (6 ft 1.8 in), 100 kg (16st) grazier who between 1958 and 1965 did not turn in a bad game for Australia."

In the 1990s, White took up painting, and his works were among those in the "Five Wallabies Fine Art Exhibition" held in Sydney during the 2003 Rugby World Cup.

== Accolades ==
In 2009 he was honoured in the fifth set of inductees into the Australian Rugby Union Hall of Fame.

He is a Life Member of the NSW Country Rugby Union.
