= Johnnie White =

Commander of the Official IRA (1946/1947–2007)

John (Johnnie) White (1946/1947–2007) was a high-ranking staff officer of the Official Irish Republican Army (Official IRA) in Derry, Northern Ireland and later a founding member and adjutant general of the Irish National Liberation Army (INLA).

Born in Derry, he was a key figure in the city during the early years of the Troubles, and was "Official IRA leader" during the events of Bloody Sunday in 1972. White, who was secretary of the Derry Citizens' Defence Association, had also been involved in the creation and defence of Free Derry.

White, who was "too ill to give oral evidence" to the inquiry, provided a number of written statements (as "OIRA 3") to the Bloody Sunday (Saville) Inquiry. He died in 2007.
