= John H. White (Medal of Honor) =

American Union soldier during Civil War

John Henry White (March 1, 1835 – April 27, 1912) was an American soldier who received the Medal of Honor for actions in the American Civil War.

== Biography ==
White was born in Philadelphia, Pennsylvania, on March 1, 1835. During the Civil War, he served as a private in Company A of the 90th Pennsylvania Infantry of the Union Army. He earned his medal on Aug 23, 1862, at Rappanhannock Station, Virginia and was presented it on May 5, 1900. He died on April 27, 1912, and is buried in Arlington Cemetery, Drexel Hill, Pennsylvania.

== Medal of Honor citation ==
for extraordinary heroism on 23 August 1862, in action at Rappahannock Station, Virginia. At the imminent risk of his life, Private White crawled to a nearby spring within the enemy's range and exposed to constant fire, filled a large number of canteens, and returned in safety to the relief of his comrades who were suffering from want of water.
