= John H. White Jr. =

American historian and museum curator (born 1933)

- Born: November 10, 1933 (age 92); Cincinnati, Ohio
- Education: Miami University
- Scientific career
- Fields: History
- Workplaces: Smithsonian, Department of Science and Technology, Division of Transportation; National Museum of American History, Museum of History and Technology

John Henry White Jr. (born November 10, 1933) is an American historian and museum curator. He was employed by the National Museum of American History from 1958 to 1990. In 1979 his book The American Railroad Passenger Car was nominated for the National Book Award for history. Since 1996 he has been a professor at Miami University in Oxford, Ohio, where he teaches history of travel and technology.

== Biography ==
John Henry White Jr., was born on November 10, 1933, in Cincinnati, Ohio. In his early years, he explored tanneries and the Cincinnati Union Terminal, where he was particularly interested in the roundhouse. From this, White developed an interest in becoming a locomotive engineer. His first job during high school entailed working on a gearbox assembly line at the Triumph Manufacturing Company. He enrolled at Miami University and during his college years worked at the McGowan Pump Company, where he learned drafting. In 1958, he graduated with bachelor's degree in modern European history from Miami University.

After graduation he got an internship position as a museum aide at the Smithsonian Institution. His early years at the Smithsonian Institution were spent working on ship models for Howard I. Chapelle, the curator of transportation. His internship was extended from time to time until his position was made permanent in 1960, when he became an associate curator in the Land Transportation Section. From 1961 until 1966 he was an associate curator of railroads at the Museum of History and Technology (renamed the National Museum of American History, curator from 1967 to 1985, and senior historian from 1986 until his retirement in 1989.

== Works ==
Title	Publication date	Pages	Notes
Cincinnati Locomotive Builders 1845-1868	1965	167	Smithsonian Bulletin 245
Early American Locomotives (Trains)	June 1, 1972	142	Dover; 19th century engravings, with brief history
Horsecars, Cable Cars and Omnibuses	June 1, 1974	107	Dover; images, with brief history
A History of the American Locomotive: Its Development, 1830–1880	January 1, 1980	528	
The John Bull: 150 Years a Locomotive	October 1, 1981	144	
The American Railroad Passenger Car	March 1, 1985	704	
The Great Yellow Fleet: A History of American Railroad Refrigerator Cars	December 1, 1986	186	
The American Railroad Freight Car: From the Wood-Car Era to the Coming of Steel	October 1, 1993	656	
American Locomotives: An Engineering History, 1830–1880	December 11, 1997	624	Updated/expanded edition of his 1980 book
The Island Queen: Cincinnati's Excursion Steamer (with Robert J. White Sr.)	March 1, 2001	115	
Cincinnati: City of Seven Hills (Ohio) (History)	2001	128	
On the Right Track: Some Historic Cincinnati Railroads	2003	160	
Wet Britches and Muddy Boots: A History of Travel in Victorian America	November 22, 2012	544	Indiana University Press, Railroads Past and Present series
