= Museum of Free Derry =

Museum in Northern Ireland

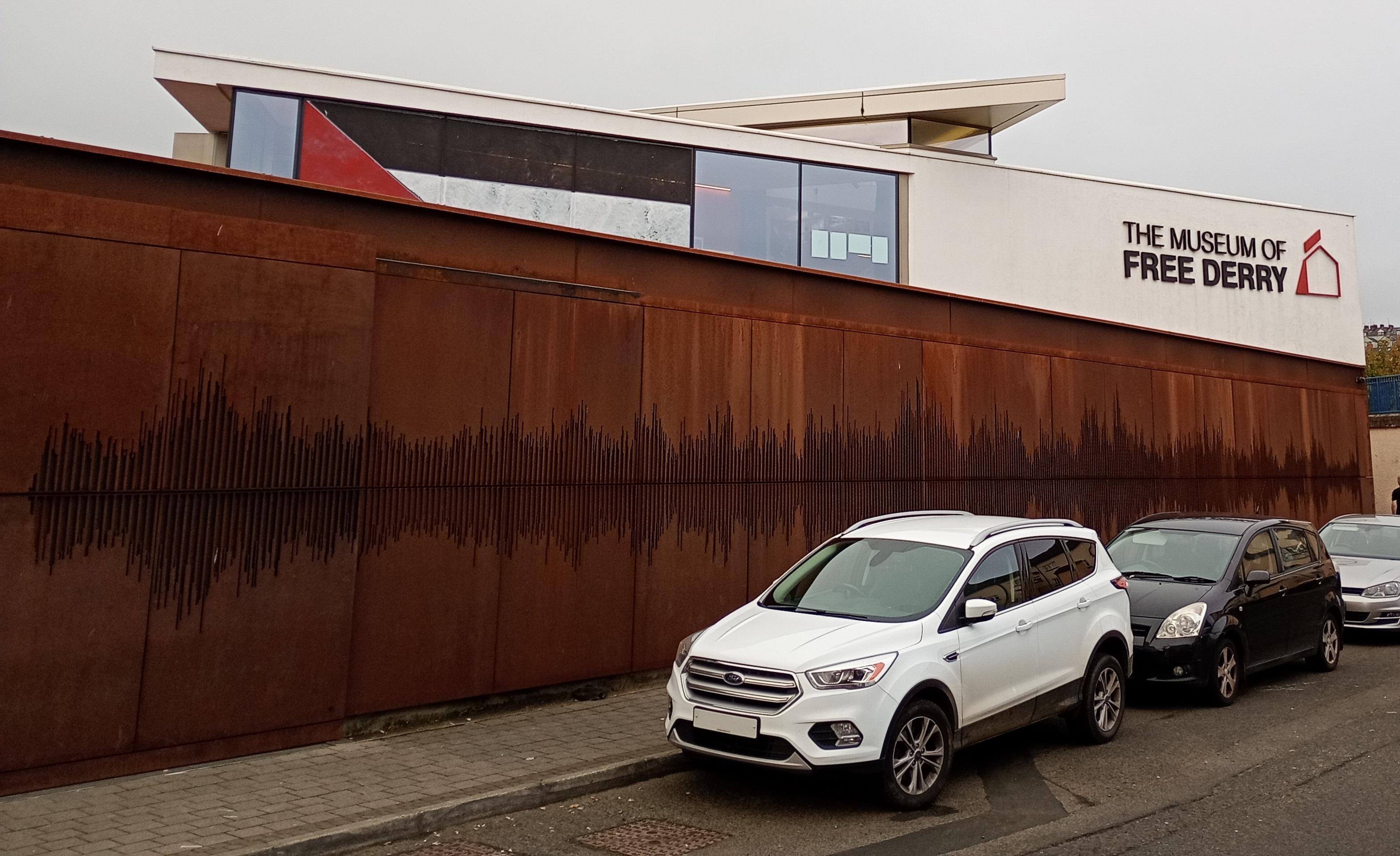
- Location: Bogside, Derry, Northern Ireland
- Website: museumoffreederry.org

The Museum of Free Derry is a museum located in Derry, Northern Ireland that focuses on the civil rights movement of the late 1960s, which led to The Troubles, and the Free Derry Irish nationalist movement in the early 1970s. Located in the Bogside district, the museum's exhibits include photographs, posters, film footage, letters and personal artifacts.
