= Free Derry =

1969–1972 no-go area in Northern Ireland

Coordinates: 54°59′49″N 07°19′32″W

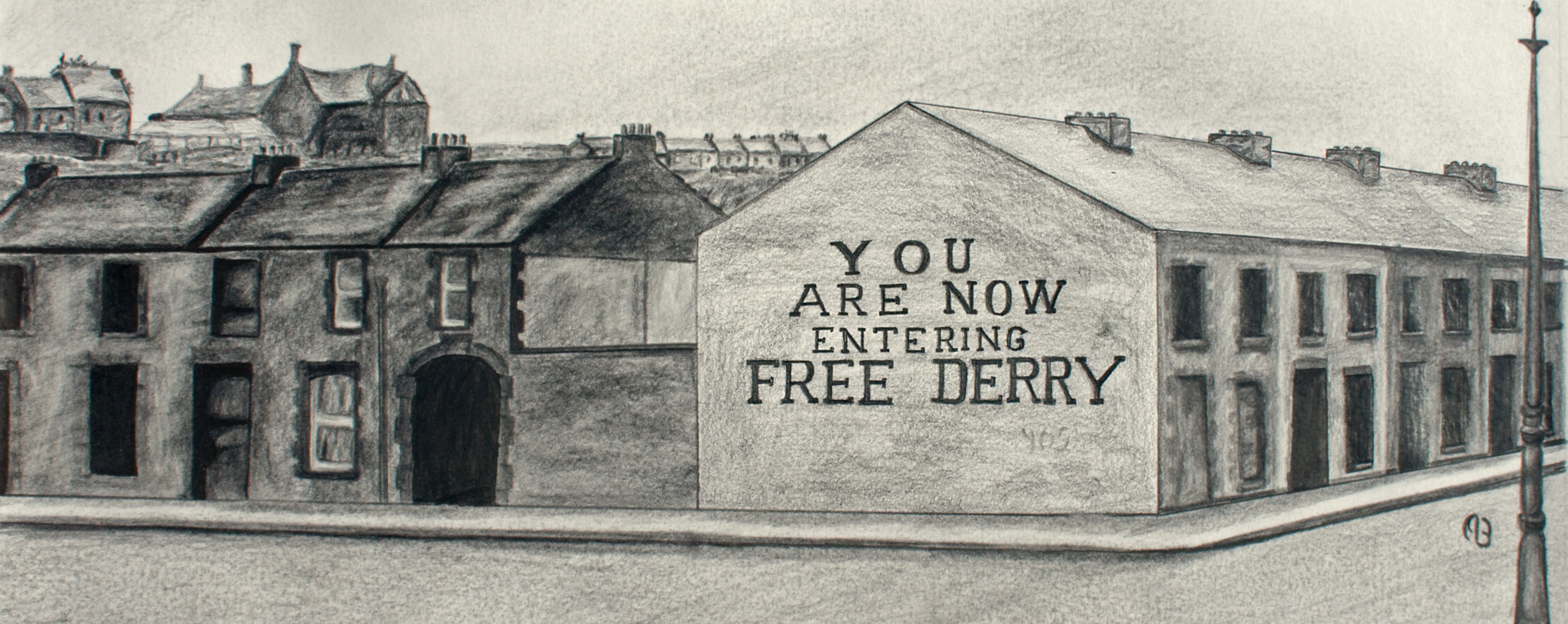
"Free Derry Corner" at the corner of Lecky Road and Fahan Street in the Bogside. The slogan was first painted in January 1969 after an unauthorised midnight incursion by RUC men into the Bogside.

Free Derry (Irish: Saor Dhoire) was a self-declared autonomous Irish nationalist area of Derry, Northern Ireland that existed between 1969 and 1972 during the Troubles. It emerged during the Northern Ireland civil rights movement, which sought to end discrimination against the Irish Catholic/nationalist minority by the Protestant/unionist government. The civil rights movement highlighted the sectarianism and police brutality of the overwhelmingly Protestant police force, the Royal Ulster Constabulary (RUC).

The area, which included the mainly Catholic Bogside and Creggan neighbourhoods, was first secured by community activists on 5 January 1969 following an incursion into the Bogside by RUC officers. Residents built barricades and carried clubs and similar arms to prevent the RUC from entering. Its name was taken from a sign painted on a gable wall in the Bogside that read, "You are now entering Free Derry." For six days, the region was a no-go area, after which the residents dismantled the barricades and RUC patrols resumed. Tensions remained high over the following months.

On 12 August 1969, sporadic violence led to the Battle of the Bogside, a three-day pitched battle between thousands of residents and the RUC, which spread to other parts of Northern Ireland. Barricades were rebuilt, petrol bomb "factories" and first aid posts were established and a radio transmitter ("Radio Free Derry") broadcast messages calling for resistance. The RUC fired CS gas into the Bogside, the first time that gas had been employed by UK police. On 14 August, the British Army were deployed at the edge of the Bogside and the RUC were withdrawn. The Derry Citizens Defence Association (DCDA) declared their intention to hold the area against both the RUC and the British Army until their demands were met. The British Army made no attempt to enter the area. The situation continued until October 1969 when, following publication of the Hunt Report, military police were allowed in.

The Irish Republican Army (IRA) began to rearm and recruit after August 1969. In December 1969, it split into the Official IRA and the Provisional IRA. Both were supported by the people of Free Derry. Meanwhile, the initially positive relations between the British Army and the nationalist community worsened. In July 1971, there was a surge of recruitment into the IRA after two young men were shot dead by British troops in Derry. The government introduced internment on 9 August 1971 in Operation Demetrius. In response, barricades were again erected around Free Derry. This time, Free Derry was defended by well-armed members of the IRA. From within the area they launched attacks on the British Army, and the Provisionals began a bombing campaign in the city centre. As before, unarmed "auxiliaries" manned the barricades, and crime was handled by a voluntary body known as the Free Derry Police.

Support for the IRA rose further after Bloody Sunday in January 1972, when 13 unarmed men and boys were shot dead by the British Parachute Regiment during a protest march in the Bogside (a 14th man was wounded and died 4 1/2 months later). Following the Bloody Friday bombings, the British retook the "no-go" areas. Free Derry came to an end on 31 July 1972 in Operation Motorman, when thousands of British troops moved in with armoured vehicles and bulldozers.

== Background ==
Derry City lies near the border between Northern Ireland and the Republic of Ireland. It has a majority nationalist population, and nationalists won a majority of seats in the 1920 local elections. Despite this, the Ulster Unionist Party controlled the local council, Londonderry Corporation, from 1923 onwards. The Unionists maintained their majority, firstly, by manipulating the constituency boundaries (gerrymandering) so that the South Ward, with a nationalist majority, returned eight councillors while the much smaller North Ward and Waterside Ward, with unionist majorities, returned twelve councillors between them (a form of malapportionment); secondly, by allowing only ratepayers to vote in local elections, rather than one man, one vote, so that a higher number of nationalists, who did not own or rent homes, were disenfranchised; and thirdly, by denying council housing to nationalists outside the South Ward constituency. The result was that there were about 2,000 nationalist families, and practically no unionists, on the housing waiting list, and that housing in the nationalist area was crowded and of a very poor condition. The South Ward comprised the Bogside, Brandywell, Creggan, Bishop Street and Foyle Road, and it was this area that would become Free Derry.

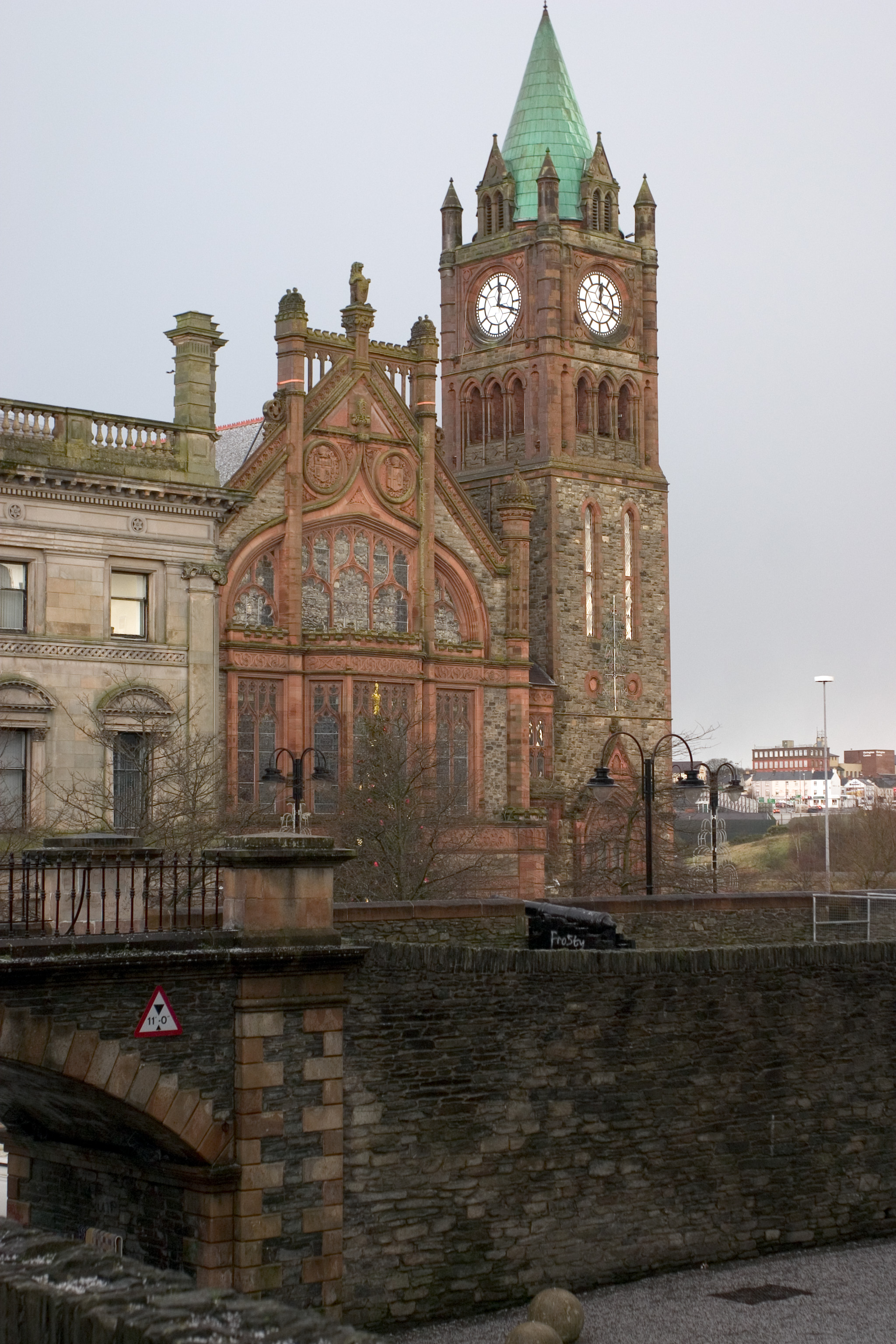
The Guildhall, where members of the Derry Housing Action Committee disrupted meetings of Londonderry Corporation in 1968

The Derry Housing Action Committee (DHAC) was formed in March 1968 by members of the Derry Branch of the Northern Ireland Labour Party and the James Connolly Republican Club, including Eamonn McCann and Eamonn Melaugh. It disrupted a meeting of Londonderry Corporation in March 1968 and in May blocked traffic by placing a caravan that was home to a family of four in the middle of the Lecky Road in the Bogside and staging a sit-down protest at the opening of the second deck of the Craigavon Bridge. After the meeting of Londonderry Corporation was again disrupted in August, Eamonn Melaugh telephoned the Northern Ireland Civil Rights Association (NICRA) and invited them to hold a march in Derry. The date chosen was 5 October 1968, an ad hoc committee was formed (although in reality most of the organising was done by McCann and Melaugh) and the route was to take the marchers inside the city walls, where nationalists were traditionally not permitted to march. The Minister of Home Affairs, William Craig, made an order on 3 October prohibiting the march on the grounds that the Apprentice Boys of Derry were intending to hold a march on the same day. In the words of Martin Melaugh of CAIN "this particular tactic...provided the excuse needed to ban the march." When the marchers attempted to defy the ban on 5 October they were stopped by a Royal Ulster Constabulary (RUC) cordon. The police drew their batons and struck marchers, including Stormont MP Eddie McAteer and Westminster MP Gerry Fitt. Subsequently, the police "broke ranks and used their batons indiscriminately on people in Duke Street". Marchers trying to escape met another party of police and "these police also used their batons indiscriminately." Water cannons were also used. The police action caused outrage in the nationalist area of Derry, and at a meeting four days later the Derry Citizens' Action Committee (DCAC) was formed, with John Hume as chairman and Ivan Cooper as vice-chairman.

== The first barricades ==
Another group formed as a result of the events of 5 October was People's Democracy, a group of students in Queen's University Belfast. They organised a march from Belfast to Derry in support of civil rights, starting out with about forty young people on 1 January 1969. The march met with violent opposition from loyalist counter-demonstrators at several points along the route. Finally, at Burntollet Bridge, five miles outside Derry, they were attacked by a mob of about two hundred wielding clubs—some of them studded with nails—and stones. Half of the attackers were later identified from press photographs as members of the B-Specials. The police, who were at the scene, chatted to the B-Specials as they prepared their ambush, and then failed to protect the marchers, many of whom ran into the river and were attacked with stones thrown from the bank. Dozens of marchers were taken to hospital. The remainder continued on to Derry where they were attacked once more on their way to Craigavon Bridge before they finally reached Guildhall Square, where they held a rally. Rioting broke out after the rally. Police drove rioters into the Bogside, but did not come after them. In the early hours of the following morning, 5 January, members of the RUC charged into St. Columb's Wells and Lecky Road in the Bogside, breaking windows and beating residents. In his report on the disturbances, Lord Cameron remarked that "for such conduct among members of a disciplined and well-led force there can be no acceptable justification or excuse" and added that "its effect in rousing passions and inspiring hostility towards the police was regrettably great."

That afternoon over 1,500 Bogside residents built barricades, armed themselves with steel bars, wooden clubs and hurleys, and told the police that they would not be allowed into the area. DCAC chairman John Hume told a meeting of residents that they were to defend the area and no-one was to come in. Groups of men wearing armbands patrolled the streets in shifts. A local activist painted "You are now entering Free Derry" in light-coloured paint on the blackened gable wall of a house on the corner of Lecky Road and Fahan Street. For many years, it was believed that it was John 'Caker' Casey that painted it, but after Casey's death it emerged that it might have been another young activist, Liam Hillen. The corner where the slogan was painted, which was a popular venue for meetings, later became known as "Free Derry Corner". On 7 January, the barricaded area was extended to include the Creggan, another nationalist area on a hill overlooking the Bogside. A clandestine radio station calling itself "Radio Free Derry" began broadcasting to residents, playing rebel songs and encouraging resistance. On a small number of occasions law-breakers attempted crimes, but were dealt with by the patrols. Despite all this, the Irish Times reported that "the infrastructure of revolutionary control in the area has not been developed beyond the maintenance of patrols." Following some acts of destruction and of violence late in the week, members of the DCAC including Ivan Cooper addressed residents on Friday, 10 January and called on them to dismantle the barricades. The barricades were taken down the following morning.

== April 1969 ==
Over the next three months there were violent clashes, with local youths throwing stones at police. Violence came to a head on Saturday, 19 April after a planned march from Burntollet Bridge to the city centre was banned. A protest in the city centre led to clashes with "Paisleyites"—unionists in sympathy with the anti-civil rights stance of Ian Paisley. Police attempting to drive the protesters back into the Bogside were themselves driven back to their barracks. A series of pitched battles followed, and barricades were built, often under the supervision of Bernadette Devlin, newly elected MP for Mid Ulster. Police pursuing rioters broke into a house in William Street and severely beat the occupant, Samuel Devenny, his family and two friends. Devenny was brought to hospital "bleeding profusely from a number of head wounds." At midnight four hundred RUC men in full riot gear and carrying riot shields occupied the Bogside. Convoys of police vehicles drove through the area with headlights blazing.

The following day, several thousand residents, led by the DCAC, withdrew to the Creggan and issued an ultimatum to the RUC – withdraw within two hours or be driven out. With fifteen minutes of the two hours remaining, the police marched out through the Butcher's Gate, even as the residents were entering from the far side. The barricades were not maintained on this occasion, and routine patrols were not prevented.

Samuel Devenny suffered a heart attack four days after his beating. On 17 July he suffered a further heart attack and died. Thousands attended his funeral, and the mood was sufficiently angry that it was clear the annual Apprentice Boys' parade, scheduled for 12 August, could not take place without causing serious disturbance.

== August – October 1969 ==
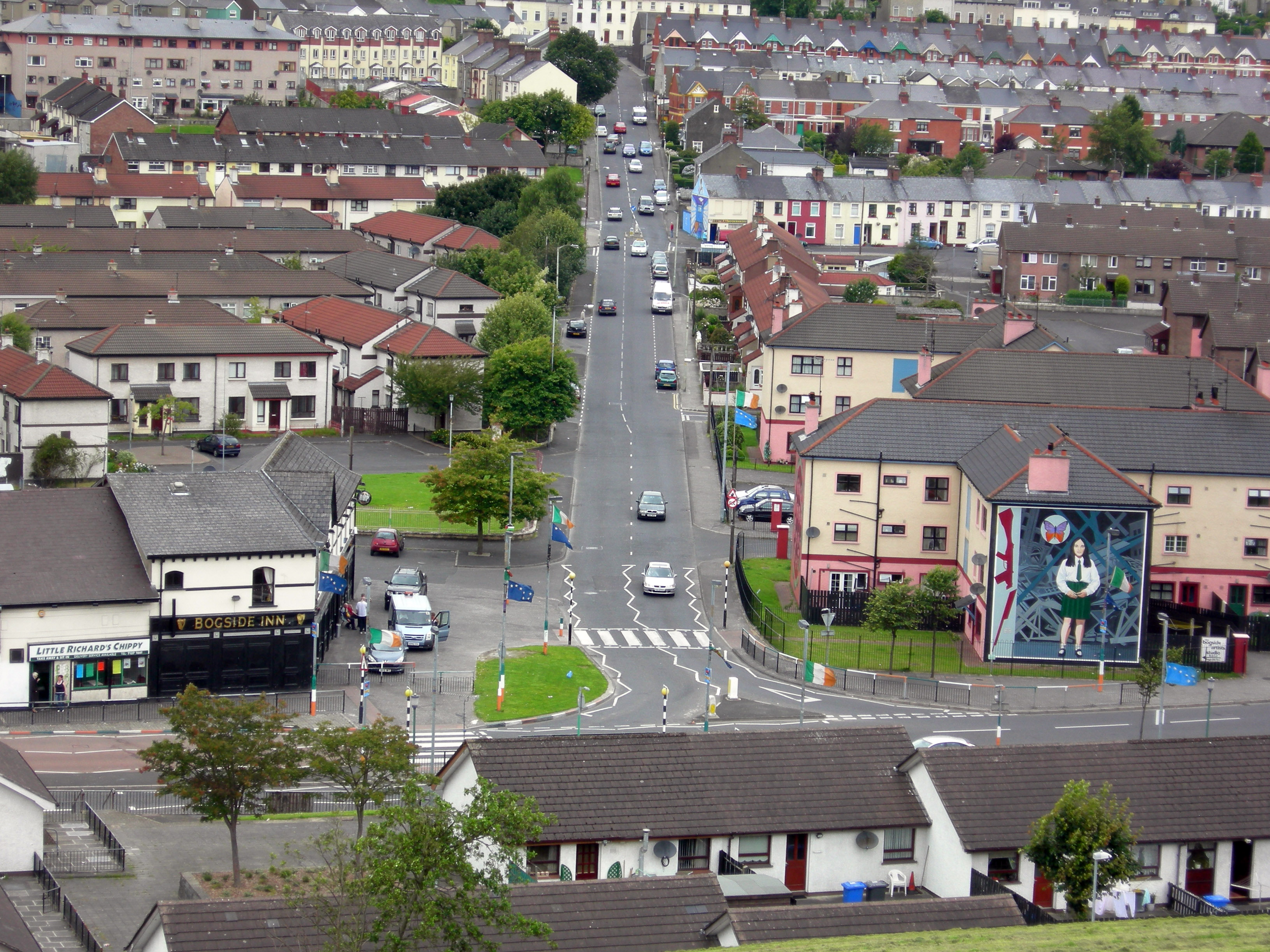
Westland Street, in the Bogside. The headquarters of the Derry Citizens Defence Association were at number 10.

The Apprentice Boys' parade is an annual celebration by unionists of the relief of the siege of Derry in 1689, which began when thirteen young apprentice boys shut the city's gates against the army of King James. At that time the parade was held on 12 August each year. Participants from across Northern Ireland and Britain marched along the city walls above the Bogside, and were often openly hostile to the residents. On 30 July 1969 the Derry Citizens Defence Association (DCDA) was formed to try to preserve peace during the period of the parade, and to defend the Bogside and Creggan in the event of an attack. The chairman was Seán Keenan, an Irish Republican Army (IRA) veteran; the vice-chairman was Paddy Doherty, a popular local man sometimes known as "Paddy Bogside" and the secretary was Johnnie White, another leading republican and leader of the James Connolly Republican Club. Street committees were formed under the overall command of the DCDA and barricades were built on the night of 11 August. The parade took place as planned on 12 August. As it passed through Waterloo Place, on the edge of the Bogside, hostilities began between supporters and opponents of the parade. Fighting between the two groups continued for two hours, then the police joined in. They charged up William Street against the Bogsiders, followed by the 'Paisleyites'. They were met with a hail of stones and petrol bombs. The ensuing battle became known as the Battle of the Bogside. Late in the evening, having been driven back repeatedly, the police fired canisters of CS gas into the crowd. Youths on the roof of a high-rise block of flats on Rossville Street threw petrol bombs down on the police. Walkie-talkies were used to maintain contact between different areas of fighting and DCDA headquarters in Paddy Doherty's house in Westland Street, and first aid stations were operating, staffed by doctors, nurses and volunteers. Women and girls made milk-bottle crates of petrol bombs for supply to the youths in the front line and "Radio Free Derry" broadcast to the fighters and their families. On the third day of fighting, 14 August, the Northern Ireland Government mobilised the Ulster Special Constabulary (B-Specials), a force greatly feared by nationalists in Derry and elsewhere. Before they engaged, however, British troops were deployed at the scene, carrying automatic rifles and sub-machine guns. The RUC and B-Specials withdrew, and the troops took up positions outside the barricaded area.

A deputation that included Eamonn McCann met senior army officers and told them that the army would not be allowed in until certain demands were met, including the disarming of the RUC, the disbandment of the B-Specials and the abolition of Stormont (the Parliament and Government of Northern Ireland). The officers agreed that neither troops nor police would enter the Bogside and Creggan districts. A 'peace corps' was formed to maintain law and order. When the British Home Secretary, Jim Callaghan, visited Northern Ireland and announced his intention to visit the Bogside on 28 August, he was told that he would not be allowed to bring either police or soldiers with him. Callaghan agreed. Accompanied by members of the Defence Committee, he was "swept along by a surging crowd of thousands" up Rossvile Street and into Lecky Road, where he "took refuge" in a local house, and later addressed crowds from an upstairs window. In preparation for Callaghan's visit the "Free Derry" wall was painted white and the "You are now entering Free Derry" sign was professionally re-painted in black lettering.

Following Callaghan's visit, some barricades were breached, but the majority remained while the people awaited concrete evidence of reform. Still the army made no move to enter the area. Law and order was maintained by a 'peace corps'—volunteers organised by the DCDA to patrol the streets and man the barricades. There was very little crime. Punishment, in the words of Eamonn McCann, "as often as not consisted of a stern lecture from Seán Keenan on the need for solidarity within the area." In September the barricades were replaced with a white line painted on the road.

The Hunt Report on the future of policing in Northern Ireland was presented to the Stormont cabinet in early October. Jim Callaghan held talks with the cabinet in Belfast on 10 October, following which the report's recommendations were accepted and made public. They included the recommendation that the RUC should be 'ordinarily' unarmed, and that the B-Specials should be phased out and replaced by a new force. The new RUC Chief Constable, Arthur Young, an Englishman, was announced, and travelled to Belfast with Callaghan. The same day, Seán Keenan announced that the DCDA was to be dissolved. On 11 October Callaghan and Young visited Free Derry, and on 12 October the first military police entered the Bogside, on foot and unarmed.

== IRA resurgence ==
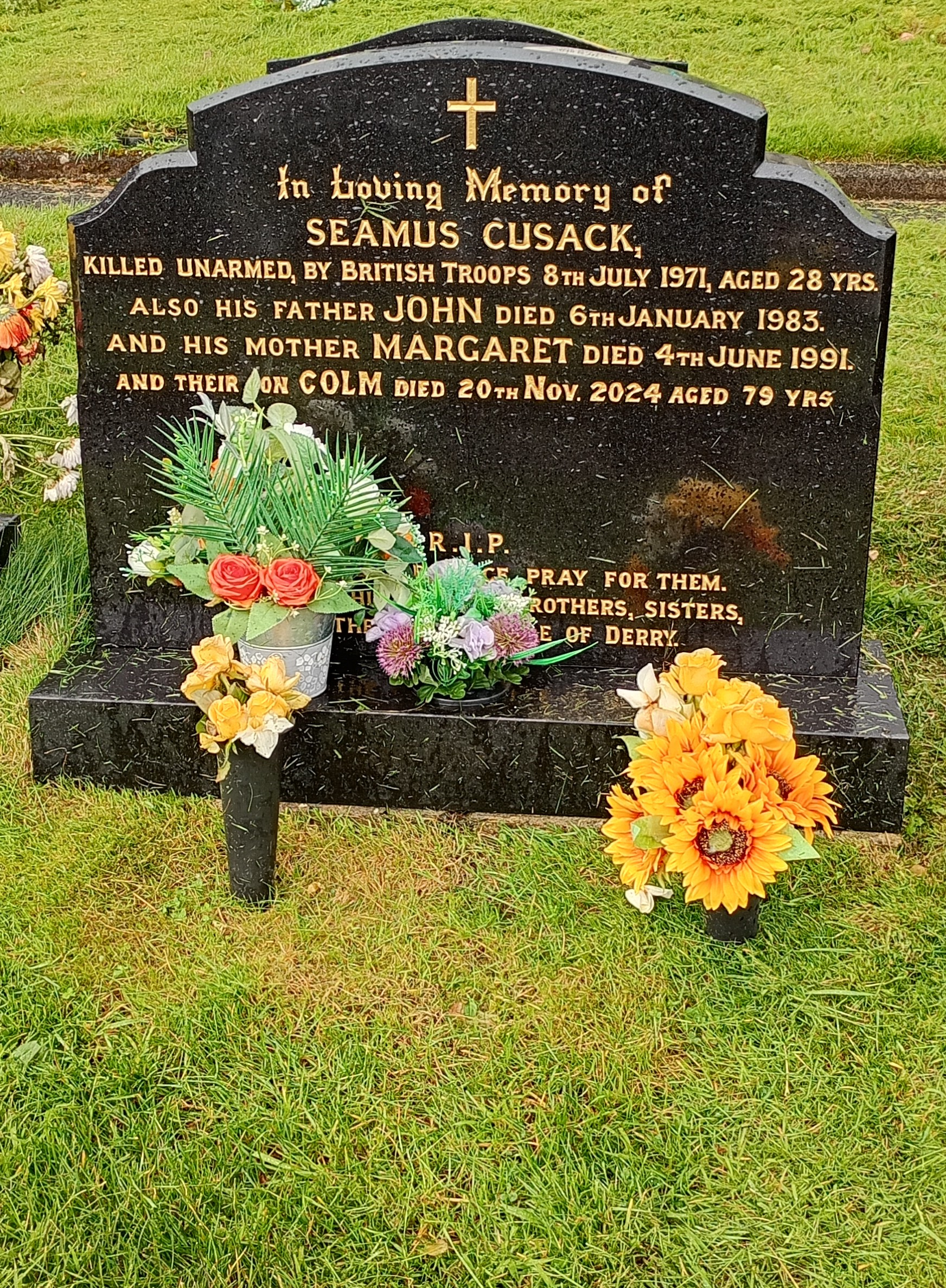
Grave of Seamus Cusack in Derry City Cemetery. Cusack's death caused the Social Democratic and Labour Party to withdraw from parliament in protest.

The Irish Republican Army (IRA) had been inactive militarily since the end of the Border Campaign in 1962. It was low in both personnel and equipment—Chief of Staff Cathal Goulding told Seán Keenan and Paddy Doherty in August 1969 that he "couldn't defend the Bogside. I haven't the men nor the guns to do it." During the 1960s the leadership of the republican movement had moved to the left. Its focus was on class struggle and its aim was to unite the Irish nationalist and unionist working classes to overthrow capitalism, both British and Irish. Republican Clubs were formed in Northern Ireland, where Sinn Féin was proscribed. These clubs were involved in the formation of the Northern Ireland Civil Rights Association (NICRA) in 1967. In Derry, the James Connolly Republican Club worked closely with Labour Party radicals, with whom they set up the Derry Housing Action Committee and Derry Unemployed Action Committee. The Derry Citizens' Defence Association was formed initially by republicans, who then invited other nationalists to join. Although there were tensions between the younger leaders like Johnnie White and the older, traditional republicans such as Seán Keenan, both sides saw the unrest of 1968–69 as a chance to advance republican aims, and the two shared the platform at the Easter Rising commemoration in April 1969.

The events of August 1969 in Derry, and more particularly in Belfast where the IRA was unable to prevent loss of life or protect families burned out of their homes, brought to a head the divisions that had already appeared within the movement between the radicals and the traditionalists, and led to a split in December 1969 into the Official IRA and the Provisional IRA. Initially, both armies organised for defensive purposes only, although the Provisionals were planning towards an offensive campaign. In Derry there was far less hostility between the two organisations than elsewhere and householders commonly paid subscriptions to both. When rioters were arrested after the Officials' Easter parade in March 1970, Officials and Provisionals picketed their trial together. At the start the Officials attracted most of the younger members. Martin McGuinness, who in August 1969 had helped defend the barricades, initially joined the Officials, but a few months later left to join the Provisionals.

Relations between the British Army and the residents had steadily decayed since the first appearance of troops in August 1969. In September, after clashes between nationalist and unionist crowds that led to the death of a Protestant man, William King, the British Army erected a 'peace ring' to enclose the nationalist population in the area they had previously controlled. Roads into the city centre were closed at night and people were prevented from walking on certain streets. Although some moderate nationalists accepted this as necessary, there was anger among young people. Clashes between youths and troops became more frequent. The riot following the Officials' Easter parade in March 1970 marked the first time that the army used 'snatch squads', who rushed into the Bogside wielding batons to make arrests. The snatch squads soon became a common feature of army arrest operations. There was also a belief that they were arresting people at random, sometimes days after the alleged offence, and based on the identification of people that they had seen from a considerable distance. The rioters were condemned as hooligans by moderates, who saw the riots as hampering attempts to resolve the situation. The Labour radicals and Official republicans, still working together, tried to turn the youth away from rioting and create socialist organisations—one such organisation was named the Young Hooligans Association—but to no avail. The Provisionals, while disapproving of riots, viewed them as the inevitable consequence of British occupation. This philosophy was more attractive to rioters, and some of them joined the Provisional IRA. The deaths of two leading Provisionals in a premature explosion in June 1970 resulted in young militants becoming more prominent in the organisation. Nevertheless, up to July 1971 the Provisional IRA remained numerically small.

Two men, Seamus Cusack and Desmond Beattie, were shot dead in separate incidents in the early morning and afternoon of 8 July 1971. They were the first people to be killed by the British Army in Derry. In both cases the British Army claimed that the men were attacking them with guns or bombs, while eyewitnesses insisted that both were unarmed. The Social Democratic and Labour Party (SDLP), the newly formed party of which John Hume and Ivan Cooper were leading members, withdrew from Stormont in protest, but among residents there was a perception that moderate policies had failed. The result was a surge of support for the IRA. The Provisionals held a meeting the following Sunday at which they called on people to "join the IRA". Following the meeting, people queued up to join, and there was large-scale rioting. The British Army post at Bligh's Lane came under sustained attack, and troops there and around the city came under fire from the IRA.

== Internment and the third Free Derry ==
The increasing violence in Derry and elsewhere led to increasing speculation that internment would be introduced in Northern Ireland, and on 9 August 1971 hundreds of republicans and nationalists were arrested in dawn raids. In Derry, residents came out onto the streets to resist the arrests, and fewer people were taken there than elsewhere; nevertheless leading figures including Seán Keenan and Johnnie White were interned. In response, barricades were erected once again and the third Free Derry came into existence. Unlike its predecessors, this Free Derry was marked by a strong IRA presence, both Official and Provisional. It was defended by armed paramilitaries—a no-go area, one in which British security forces were unable to operate.

Gun attacks on the British Army increased. Six soldiers were wounded in the first day after internment, and shortly afterwards a soldier was killed—the first to be killed by either IRA in Derry. The army moved into the area in force on 18 August to dismantle the barricades. A gun battle ensued in which a young Provisional IRA officer, Eamonn Lafferty, was killed. A crowd staging a sit-down protest was hosed down and the protesters, including John Hume and Ivan Cooper, arrested. With barricades re-appearing as quickly as they were removed, the army eventually abandoned their attempt.

The Derry Provisionals had little contact with the IRA elsewhere. They had few weapons (about twenty) which they used mainly for sniping. At the same time, they launched their bombing campaign in Derry. Unlike in Belfast, they were careful to avoid killing or injuring civilians. Eamonn McCann wrote that "the Derry Provos, under Martin McGuinness, had managed to bomb the city centre until it looked as if it had been hit from the air without causing any civilian casualties."

Although both IRAs operated openly, neither was in control of Free Derry. The barricades were manned by unarmed 'auxiliaries'. Crime was dealt with by a volunteer force called the Free Derry Police, which was headed by Tony O'Doherty, a Derry footballer and Northern Ireland International.

== Bloody Sunday ==
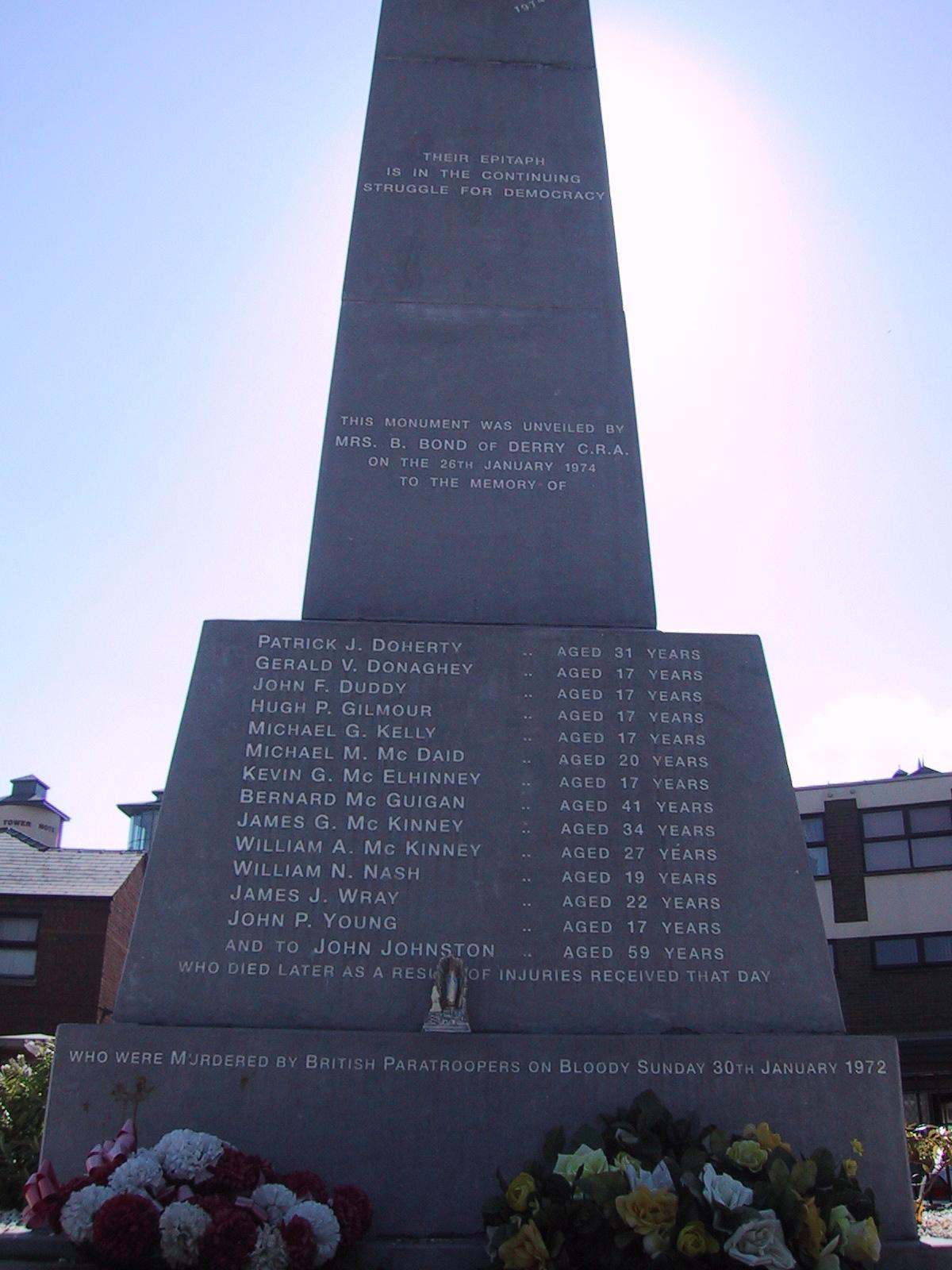
The Bloody Sunday memorial in Rossville Street. All of the dead were residents of Free Derry.

An anti-internment protest organised by NICRA at Magilligan Camp in January 1972 was met with violence from the 1st Battalion, The Parachute Regiment (1 Para). NICRA had organised a march from the Creggan to Derry city centre, in defiance of a ban, on the following Sunday, 30 January 1972. Both IRAs were asked, and agreed, to suspend operations on that day to ensure the march passed off peacefully. The British Army erected barricades around the Free Derry area to prevent marchers from reaching the city centre. On the day, march organisers turned the march away from the barriers and up to Free Derry Corner, but some youths proceeded to the barrier at William Street and stoned soldiers. Troops from 1 Para then moved into Free Derry and opened fire, killing thirteen people, all of whom were subsequently found to be unarmed. A fourteenth shooting victim died four months later in June 1972. Like the killing of Cusack and Beattie the previous year, Bloody Sunday had the effect of hugely increasing recruitment to the IRA, even among people who previously would have been 'moderates'.

== February – July 1972 ==
Both the Provisional and Official IRA stepped up attacks after Bloody Sunday, with the tacit support of the residents. Local feelings changed, however, with the killing of Ranger William Best by the Official IRA. Best was a 19-year-old local man who was home on leave from the British Army at his parents' house in the Creggan. He was abducted, interrogated and shot. The following day 500 women marched to the Republican Club offices in protest. Nine days later, on 29 May, the Official IRA declared a ceasefire. The Provisional IRA initially stated that they would not follow suit, but after informal approaches to the British Government they announced a ceasefire from 26 June. Martin McGuinness was the Derry representative in a party of senior Provisionals who travelled to London for talks with William Whitelaw, the Secretary of State for Northern Ireland. The talks were not resumed after the ending of the truce following a violent confrontation in Belfast when troops prevented Catholic families from taking over houses in the Lenadoon estate.

Political pressure for the action against the "no-go" areas increased after the events of Bloody Friday in Belfast. A British Army attack was considered inevitable, and the IRA took the decision not to resist it. On 31 July 1972, Operation Motorman was launched when thousands of British troops, equipped with armoured cars and armoured bulldozers (AVREs), dismantled the barricades and occupied the area. The Derry Journal stated:

Not since Russian troops entered Budapest and Prague in the 1950s and 1960s to suppress risings of the Czechoslovakian and Hungarian people, have sights been seen in any European city like those in Derry yesterday morning as 1,500 British soldiers followed 300 army vehicles in a massive invasion of the Bogside and Creggan estate.

== Subsequent history ==
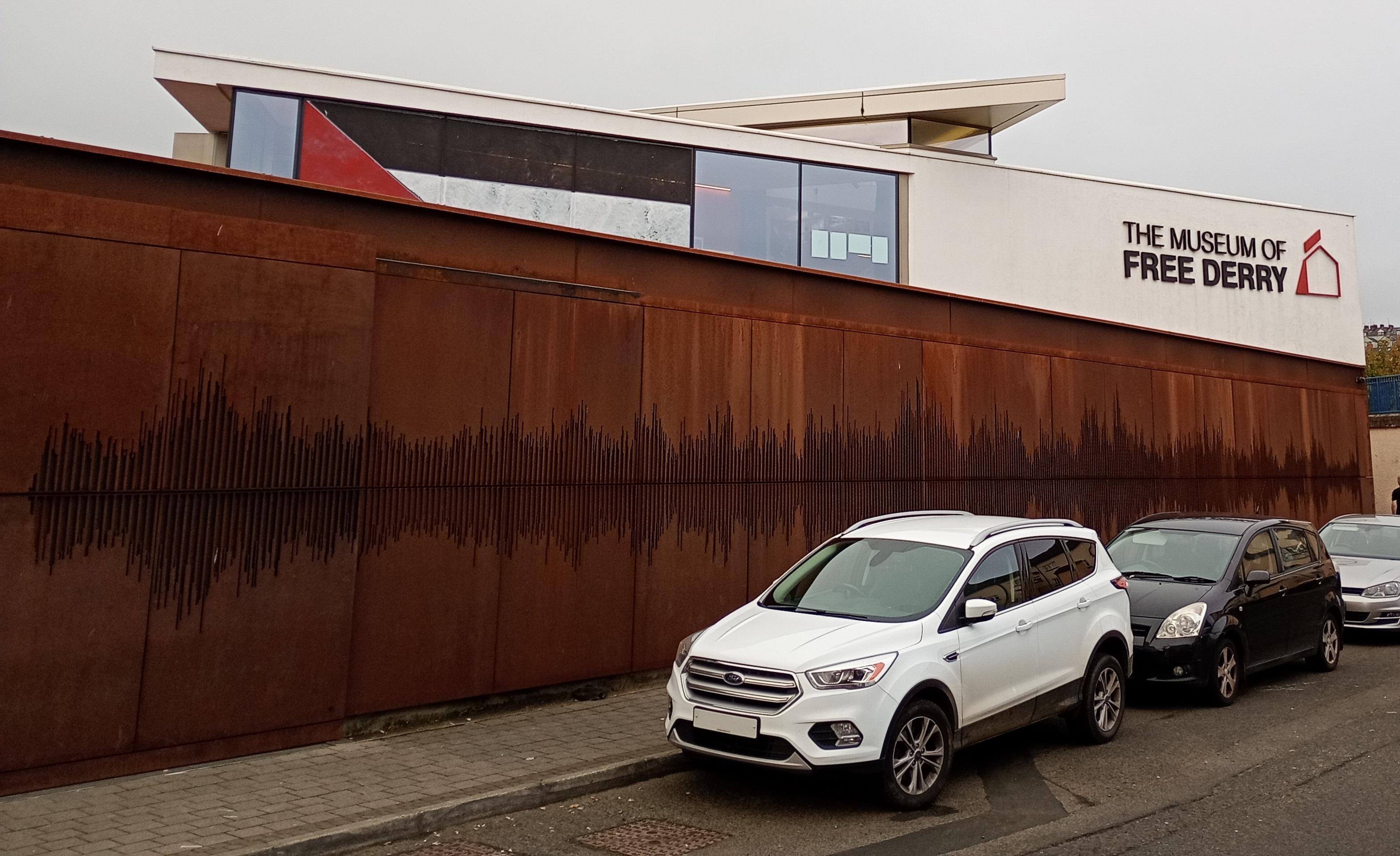
The Museum of Free Derry

After Operation Motorman, the British Army controlled the Bogside and Creggan by stationing large numbers of troops within the area, by conducting large-scale 'search' operations that were in fact undertaken for purposes of intelligence gathering, and by setting up more than a dozen covert observation posts. Over the following years IRA violence in the city was contained to the point where it was possible to believe 'the war was over' in the area, although there were still frequent street riots. Nationalists—even those who did not support the IRA—remained bitterly opposed to the army and to the state.

Many of the residents' original grievances were addressed with the passing of the Local Government Act (Northern Ireland) 1972, which redrew the electoral boundaries and introduced universal adult suffrage based on the single transferable vote. Elections were held in May 1973. Nationalists gained a majority on the council for the first time since 1923. Since then the area has been extensively redeveloped, with modern housing replacing the old houses and flats. The Free Derry era is commemorated by the Free Derry wall, the murals of the Bogside Artists and the Museum of Free Derry.

== See also ==
- History of Northern Ireland
- History of Derry
- Northern Ireland Civil Rights Movement
- Paris Commune
- Limerick Soviet

== Bibliography ==
- Devlin, Bernadette, The Price of my Soul, 1st edition, Alfred A. Knopf, New York, 1969
- Lord Cameron, Disturbances in Northern Ireland, HMSO, Belfast, 1969 (CAIN Web Service)
- McCann, Eamonn, War and an Irish Town, 2nd edition, Pluto Press, London, 1980, ISBN 0-86104-302-2
- Ó Dochartaigh, Niall, From Civil Rights to Armalites: Derry and the Birth of the Irish Troubles, Palgrave MacMillan, Basingstoke, 2005, ISBN 1-4039-4431-8
- Office of the Police Ombudsman for Northern Ireland, Report of the Police Ombudsman for Northern Ireland into a complaint made by the Devenny family on 20 April 2001, Belfast, 2001 (The Pat Finucane Centre)
- Farrell, Sean, Rituals and Riots: Sectarian Violence and Political Culture in Ulster, 1784–1886, The University Press of Kentucky 2000, ISBN 978-0-8131-2171-0
- Kerr, Adrian, Free Derry: Protest and Resistance, The Museum of Free Derry 2013, ISBN 978-1-3999-7442-4
