= Bogside =

Neighbourhood of Derry, Northern Ireland

- Neighbourhood
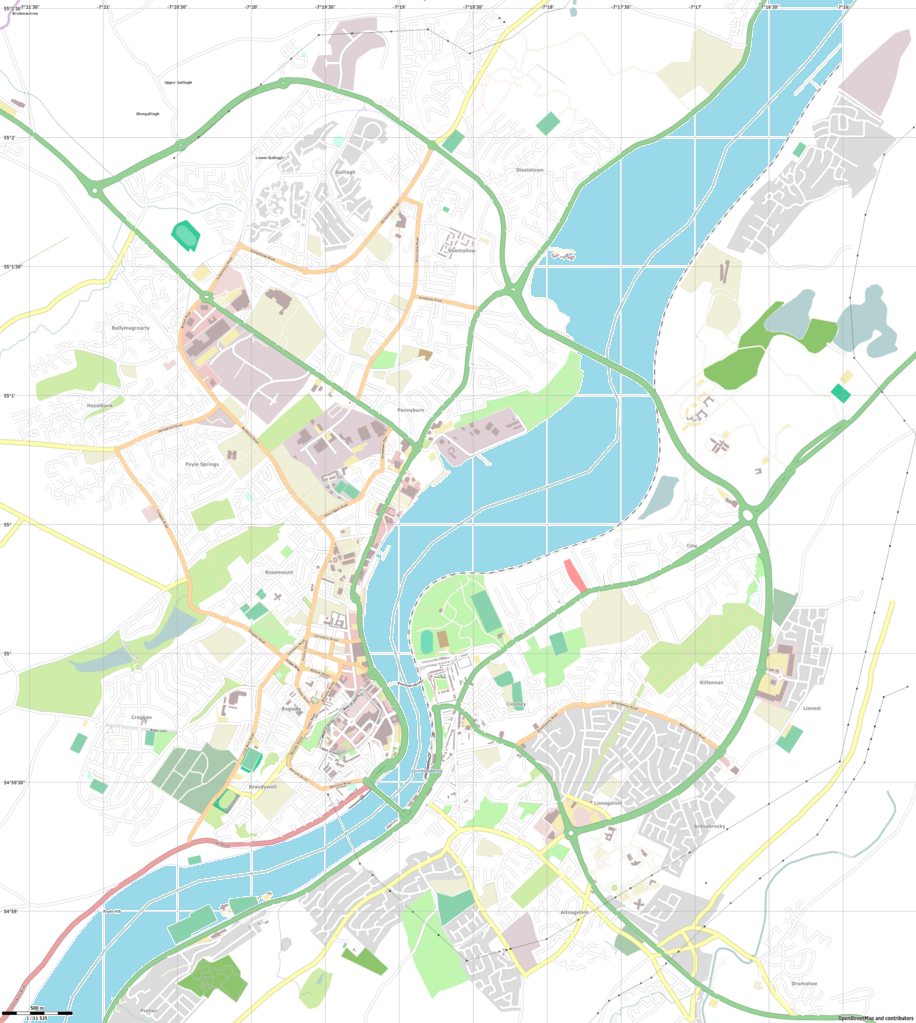
- Location within Derry Location within Northern Ireland Location within island of Ireland
- Coordinates: 54°59′52″N 7°19′38″W
- Country: United Kingdom
- Division: Northern Ireland
- County: County Londonderry
- City: Derry

The Bogside is a neighbourhood outside the city walls of Derry, Northern Ireland. The large gable-wall murals by the Bogside Artists, Free Derry Corner and the Gasyard Féile (an annual music and arts festival held in a former gasyard) are popular tourist attractions. The Bogside is a majority Catholic/Irish republican area, and shares a border with the Protestant/Ulster loyalist enclave of the Fountain.

== History ==
=== Early history ===
The area now known as the Bogside was originally underwater, as the River Foyle originally flowed on both sides of what would become Derry, but the area west of the former island eventually dried up into marshland as the Foyle diverted to flow exclusively on the east side. During the plantation of Ulster, the area located west of the River Foyle became known as the 'cityside', and the area across the Foyle became known as the Waterside. The marshland area to the west of the city became known as The Bogside, with the name first being used in a report by Sir Henry Docwra in 1600.

=== The Troubles ===
The area has been a focus point for many of the events of the Troubles; in 1969, a fierce three-day battle against the RUC and local Catholics—known as the Battle of the Bogside—became a starting point of the Troubles. Between 1969 and 1972, the area along with the Creggan and other Catholic areas became a no-go area for the British Army and police. Both the Official and Provisional IRA openly patrolled the area and local residents often paid subscriptions to both.

On 30 January 1972, a march organised by the Northern Ireland Civil Rights Association against internment that was put into effect the year before turned into a bloodbath known as Bloody Sunday. The British Parachute Regiment shot dead 14 protesters and injured 14 more. This resulted in a large surge of recruitment for both wings of the IRA in the city. After Operation Motorman and the end of Free Derry and other no-go areas in Northern Ireland, the Bogside along with the majority of the city experienced frequent street riots and sectarian conflict lasting all the way to the early 1990s.

In 1974, the Official IRA declared an end to their armed campaign, with hardline volunteers on the ground already angry about the ceasefire in mid 1972. In result, Seamus Costello and other socialist militants formed the Irish Republican Socialist Movement. This new movement included the Irish National Liberation Army, the paramilitary wing of the IRSM. Derry and particularly the Bogside became one of many strongholds for the INLA. All three volunteers who died in the 1981 Irish hunger strike were from Derry or County Londonderry.

The Irish People's Liberation Organisation, a breakaway group of the INLA, made a small but effective presence in Derry. From 1987 to 1992, it engaged in a feud with the INLA in the city along with other areas in Ireland. The feud ended with the Provisionals stepping in and killing the main Belfast leadership while letting the rest of the organisation dissolve in the rest of Ireland. Throughout the rest of the 1990s, the Bogside became relatively peaceful compared to other localities of Northern Ireland at that time such as Belfast, even though street riots were still frequent.

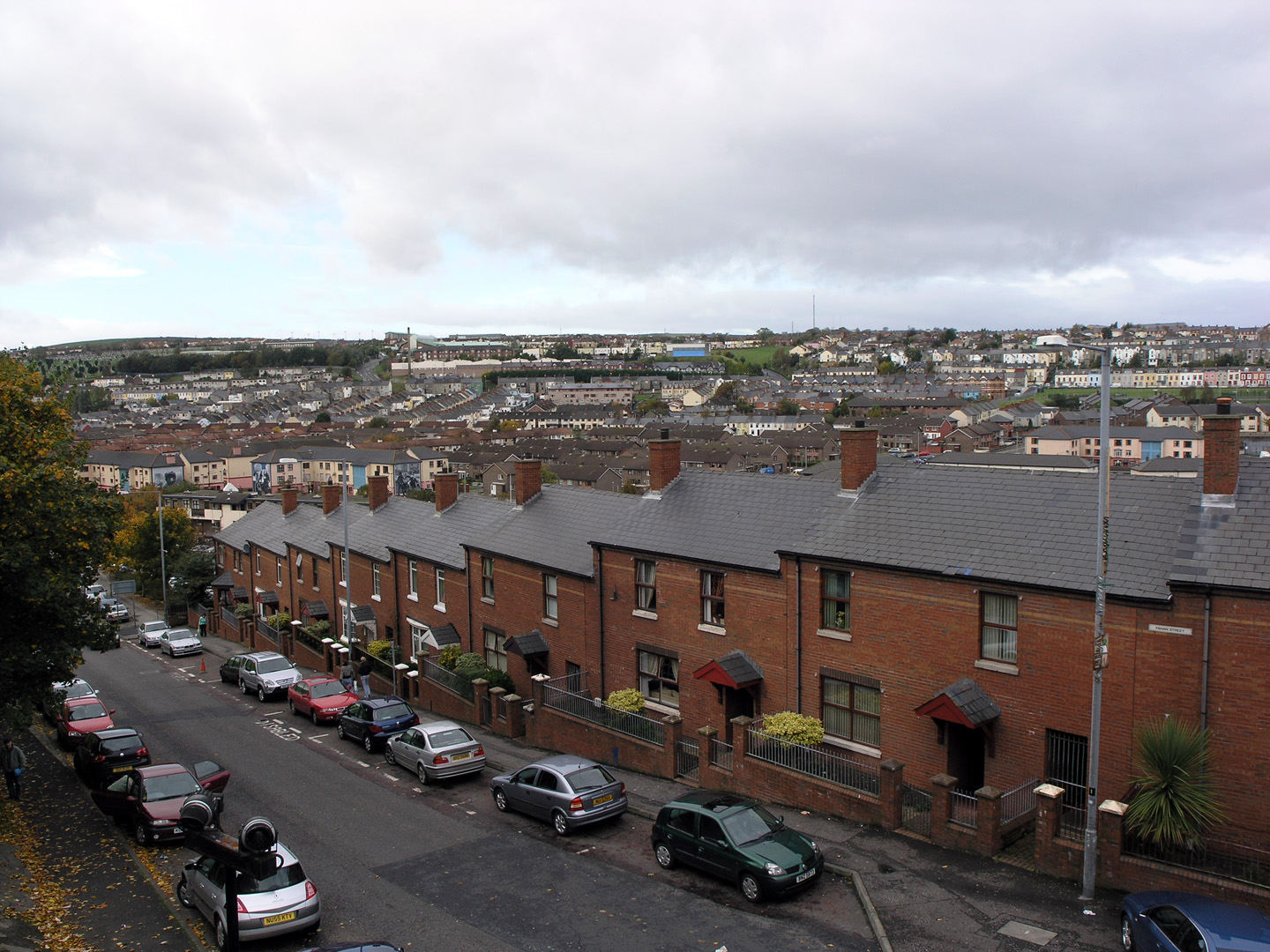
The Bogside, looking down from the entrance to the city walls

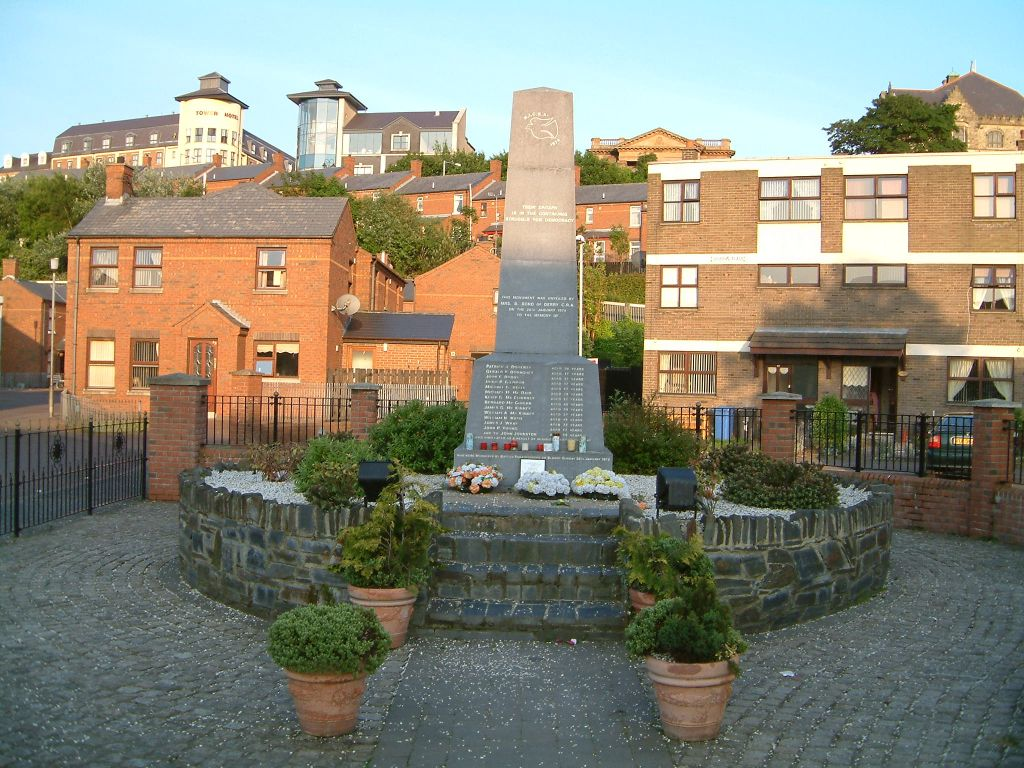
Bloody Sunday Memorial

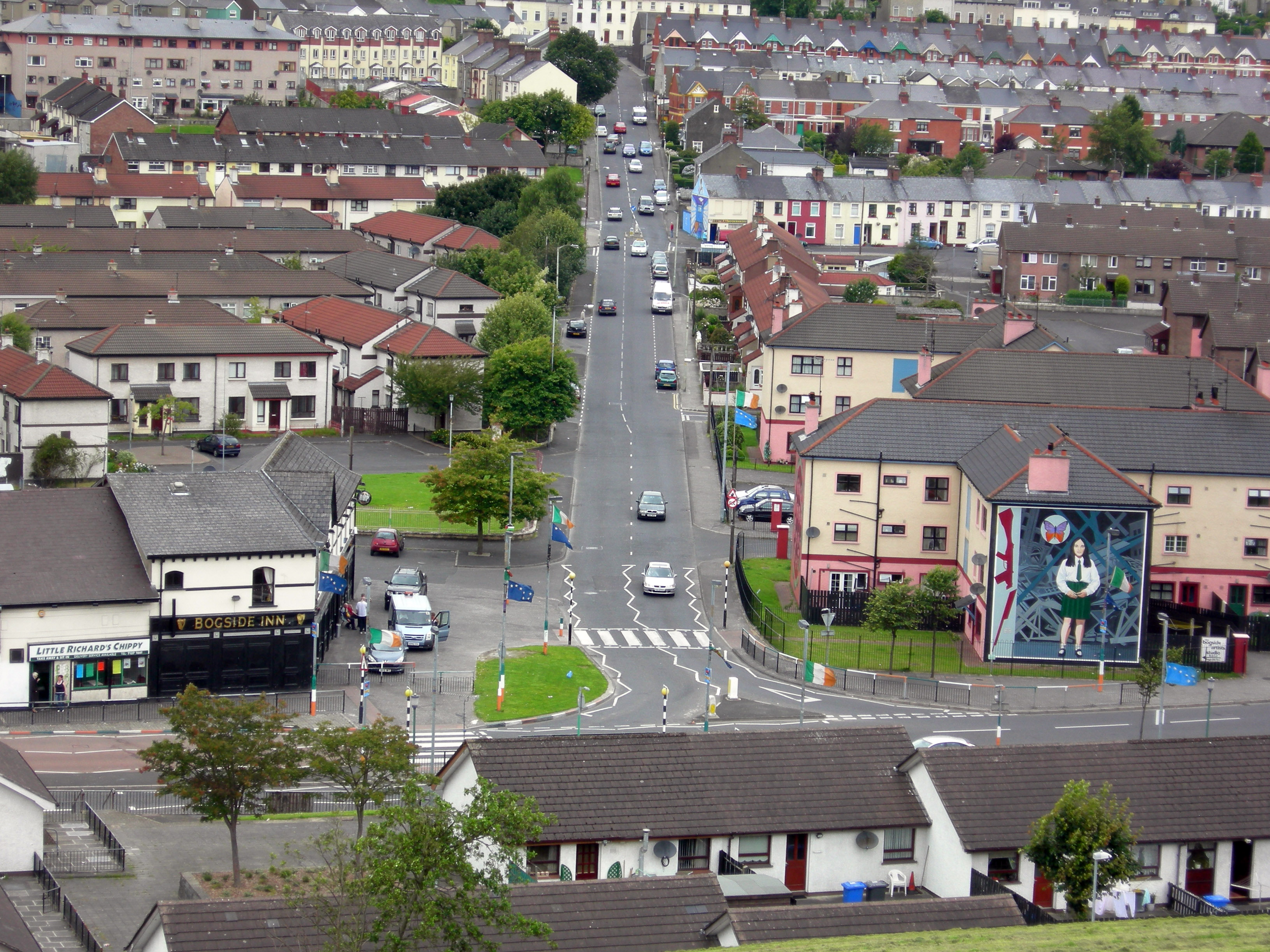
Westland Street in the Bogside, viewed from the city wall, July 2007

== See also ==
- Free Derry
- Free Derry Corner
- History of Derry
- History of Ireland
