= History of Derry =

City history

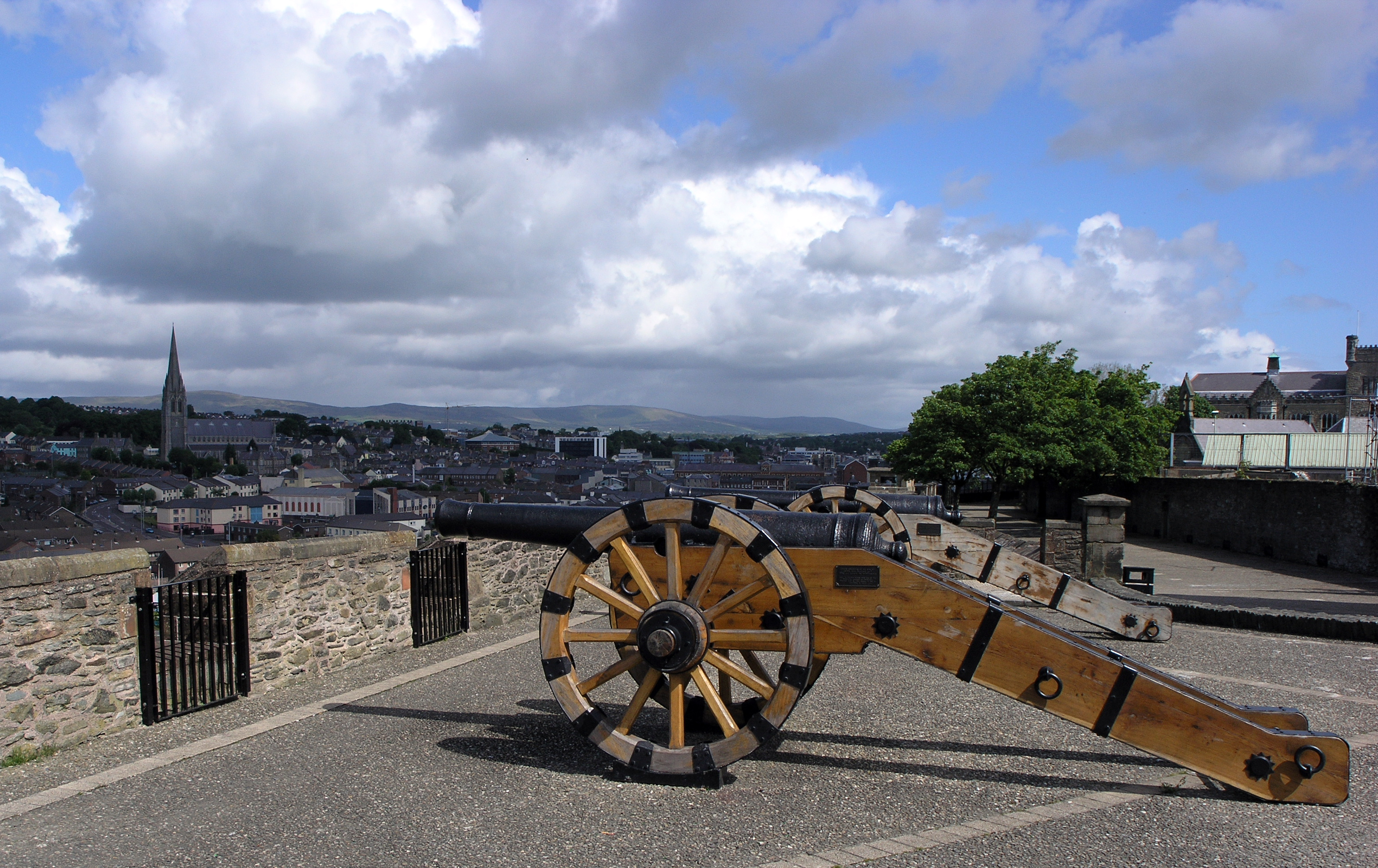
Cannon on the Derry Walls. The Bogside is on the left.

The earliest references to the history of Derry date to the 6th century when a monastery was founded there; however, archaeological sites and objects predating this have been found. The name Derry comes from the Old Irish word Daire (modern: Doire) meaning 'oak grove' or 'oak wood'.

== Early history ==
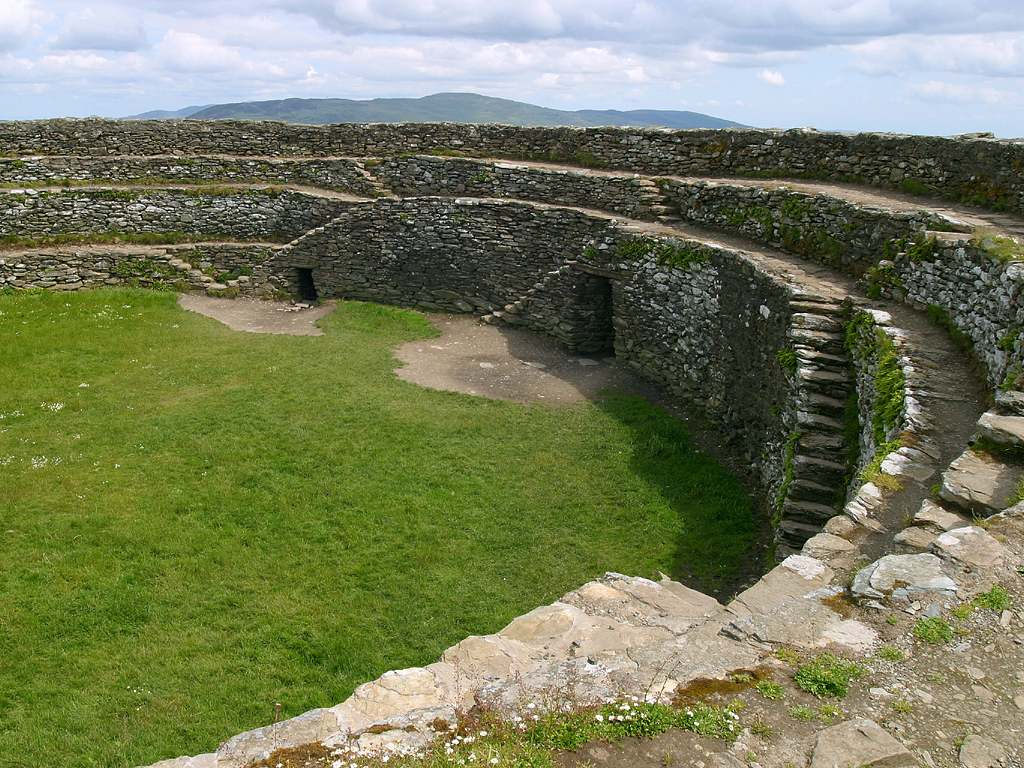
Gríanán of Aileach, Donegal

In the 6th century, a Christian monastery was founded on the hill of Doire to the east of the River Foyle. The site was allegedly granted by a local king who had a fortress there. According to legend the monastery of Doire was established by Saint Colmcille/Columba. Colmcille founded many important monasteries in Ireland and Scotland, including Durrow Abbey in the Irish Midlands and Iona on an island off the west of Scotland. The claim that he founded a settlement at Doire is less certain, although that monastery belonged to the federation of Columban churches which looked to Colmcille as their spiritual founder and leader. According to local tradition the location of the first church was where St. Columba's Long Tower Church stands today. According to local tradition, its site is believed to be where St. Columba established his original monastery around 546 AD.

The medieval Templemore Cathedral, originally the diocesan seat in Templemore, faced significant destruction during the turbulence of the 16th century. It was first severely damaged on April 24, 1568, when an accidental explosion of gunpowder stored within the church occurred. Later, during the Nine Years' War, the remnants of the cathedral met further desecration. On April 16, 1600, Sir Henry Docwra's English force of 4,000 soldiers dismantled the ruins, using the stones to construct the defensive walls and ramparts of Derry. Nearby was a medieval Irish round tower. During the later Middle Ages the old monastery of Derry evolved into an Augustinian congregation. A small church of that monastery survived up to the 17th century on a site within the present walls of Derry and was used by the London colonists as their first place of worship when they came to build the walled city.

Although the Vikings sailed up the loughs and rivers of this area, the monastery of Derry escaped the worst effects of their raids. During the 12th and 13th centuries, Derry and the surrounding area saw settlement by Norman colonists, culminating in the early 14th century with the Earl of Ulster, Richard de Burgh, acquiring Derry from its bishop, from which it was part of the Earldom of Ulster until its collapse.

== Plantation of Ulster ==
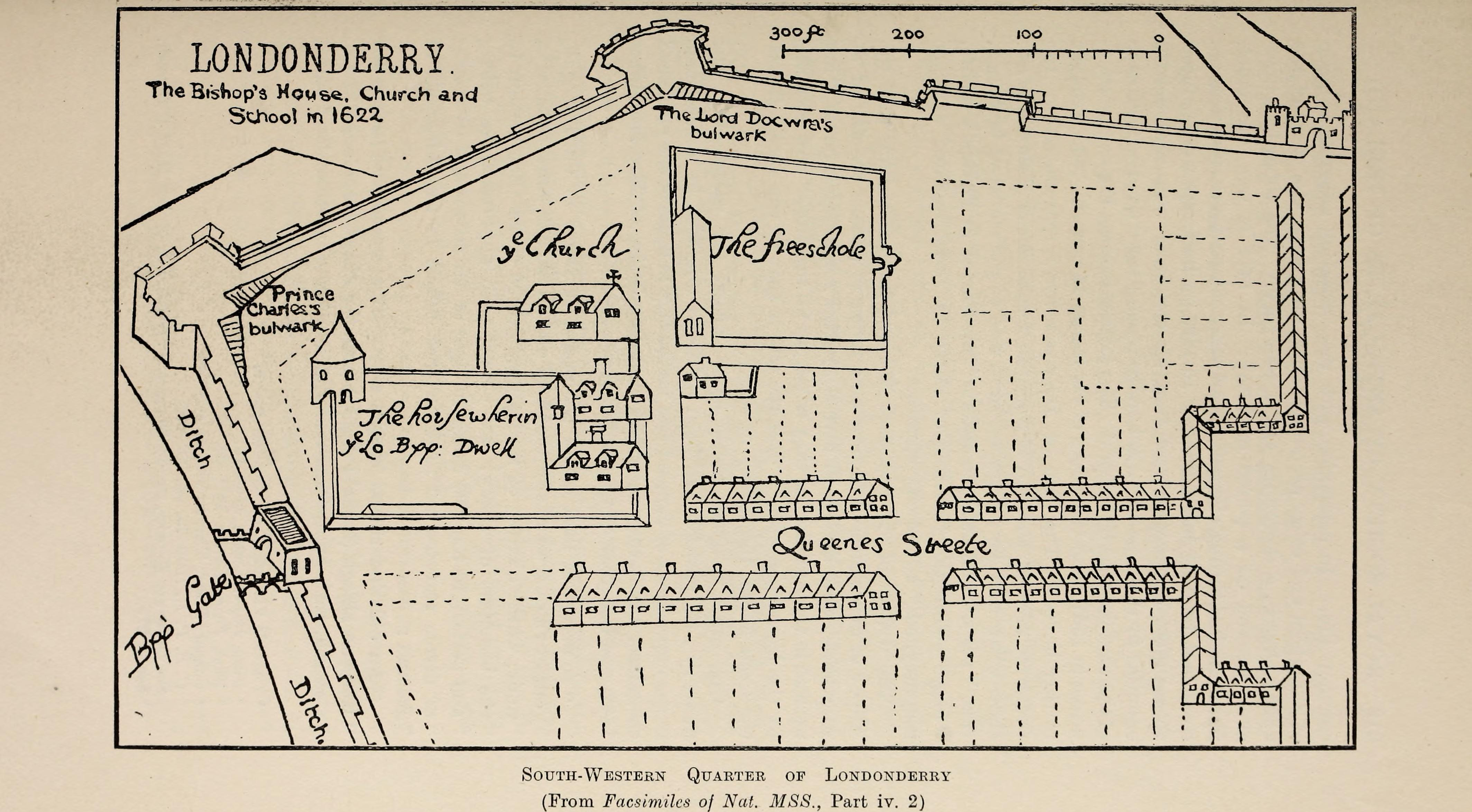
Map of Derry in 1622, showing the Bishop of Derry's residence in the northwest.

After the collapse of the Earldom of Ulster in the 14th century, Ulster saw a Gaelic resurgence at the expense of the Norman colony. Throughout the second half of the 16th century, Queen Elizabeth I's military leaders tried to conquer the province of Ulster, then outside English control. The English first came to Derry in 1566 but the garrison established there at that time lasted only a few years. A second, more successful garrison returned in 1600 during the Nine Years War against the Gaelic O'Neill and O'Donnell earls. On this occasion the English managed to hold on to Derry and, when the war came to an end in 1603, a small trading settlement was established and given the legal status of city. During the 1608 O'Doherty's Rebellion, this 'infant city' was attacked by Sir Cahir O'Doherty, Irish chieftain of Inishowen, and the settlement was virtually wiped out.

This attack came about shortly after the Flight of the Earls when the O'Neill and O'Donnell chieftains, together with their principal supporters, fled to the continent, leaving Gaelic Ulster leaderless. The new king in London, James I, decided on a revolutionary plan designed once and for all to subordinate Ulster. The 'Plantation of Ulster' required the colonising of the area by loyal English and Scottish migrants who were to be Protestant in religion. One part of this colonisation was to be organised by the ancient and wealthy livery companies of the City of London. In 1623 the new county granted to the Londoners and its fortified city, built across the River Foyle from the recently destroyed settlement, were renamed Londonderry in honour of this association. At this point the city was granted a Royal Charter by King James I. The usage of "Derry" versus "Londonderry" is still controversial.

The City of Londonderry was the jewel in the crown of the Ulster Plantation. It was laid out according to the best contemporary principles of town planning, imported from the continent (the original street lay-out has survived to the present almost intact). More importantly, the city was enclosed by massive stone and earthen fortifications. It was the last walled city built in Ireland and the only city on the island whose ancient walls survive complete. Among the city's new buildings was St. Columb's Cathedral (1633). This is one of the most important 17th century buildings in the country and was the first specifically Protestant cathedral erected anywhere in the world following the Reformation.

== Civil wars and sieges ==
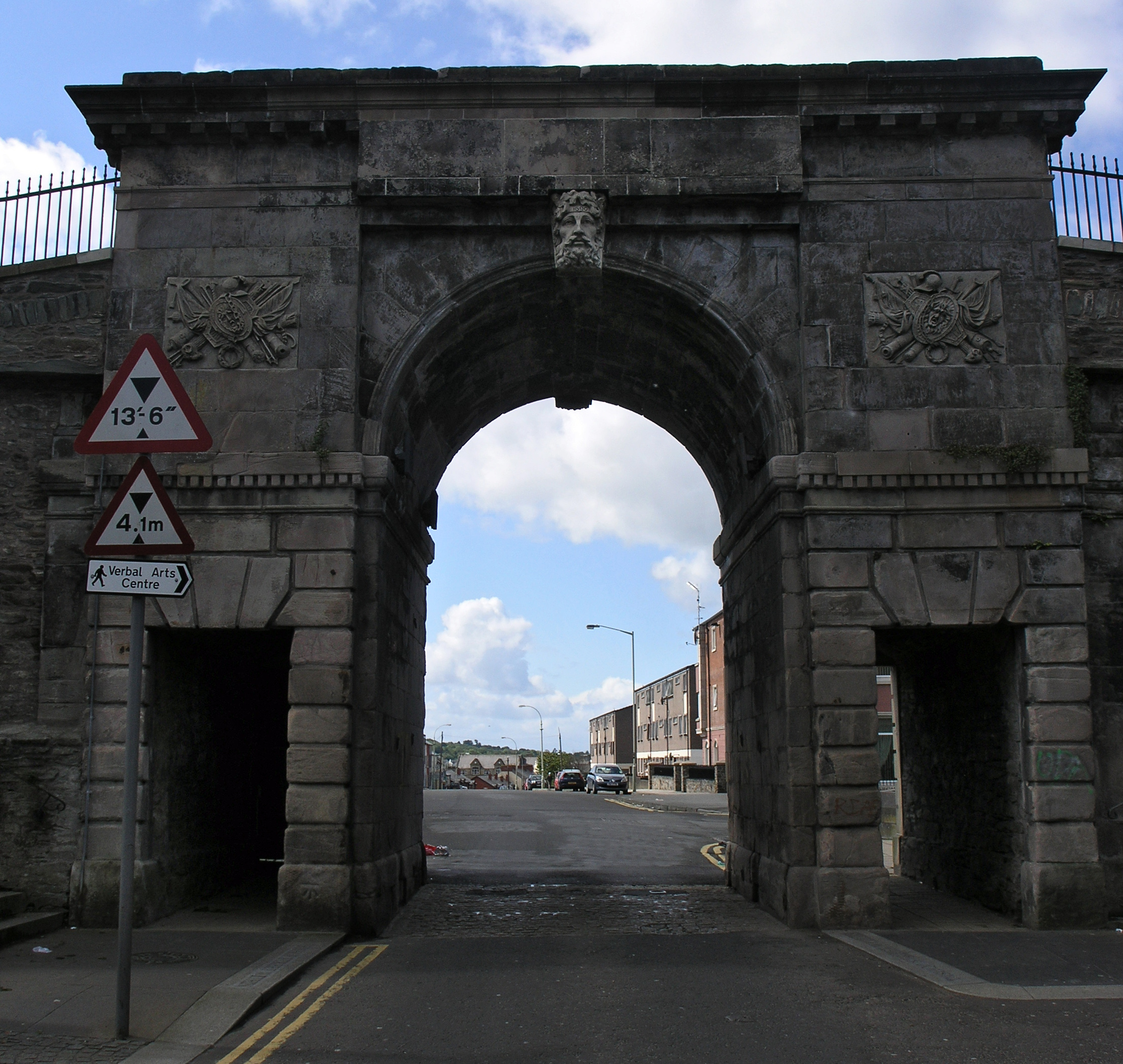
Bishops Street Gate.

The new city was slow to prosper. By the 1680s it still had only about 2,000 inhabitants; and yet it was, by far, the largest town in Ulster. Along with most parts of Britain and Ireland, the city suffered from the upheavals in the 1640s. This began with the Irish Rebellion of 1641, when the Gaelic Irish insurgents made a failed attack on the city. For the next ten years of war, Derry and its environs became a stronghold for the British Protestant settlers, who raised the "Lagan army" to defend themselves from the Irish Confederates. However, the Protestants were disunited about how to respond to the events of the English Civil War, with some of them supporting the King, some the English Parliament and some the Scottish Covenanters. The Covenanters initially supported the Parliamentarians, with their goal being to protect the local Protestant population from attacks by the Catholic rebel, however later switched to support the Royalists. Much of the Covenanter army was wiped out at the Battle of Benburb by the Irish Ulster Army under the command of general Eoghan Ruadh O'Néill (anglicized: Owen Roe O Neill). The Covenanters managed to retreat to East Ulster but were unable to have a major impact for the rest of the war. In 1649 the city and its garrison, which supported the republican Parliament in London, were besieged by Scottish Presbyterian (Covenanter) forces loyal to King Charles I. The Parliamentarians besieged in Derry were relieved by a strange alliance of Roundhead troops under George Monck and Owen O Neill, during a brief civil war within the Irish Confederacy. These temporary allies were soon fighting each other again, however, after the landing in Ireland of the New Model Army in 1649. The war in Ulster was finally brought to an end when the Parliamentarians crushed the Irish Catholic Ulster army at the battle of Scarrifholis in nearby Donegal in 1650.

In 1688, Ireland became the battleground for the Glorious Revolution in England, when James II was deposed by William of Orange. Catholic Ireland strongly supported James, but many Protestants in Ulster secretly supported William. James II had his Catholic viceroy Richard Talbot, 1st Earl of Tyrconnell take action to ensure that all strong points in Ireland were held by garrisons loyal to the Jacobite cause. By November 1688, only the walled city of Londonderry and nearby Enniskillen had a Protestant garrison. An army of around 1,200 men, mostly "Redshanks" (Highlanders), under Alexander MacDonnell, 3rd Earl of Antrim, was slowly organised (they set out on the week William of Orange landed in England). When they arrived on 7 December 1688 the gates were closed against them and the Siege of Derry began.

On 18 April 1689, while his attempts to regain his throne in what became the Williamite war in Ireland with the Jacobites got under way, King James came to the city and summoned it to surrender. The King was rebuffed and actually fired at by some of the more determined defenders; tradition has the apprentice boys closing the gates and saving the city. As a policy of 'no surrender' was confirmed, the Jacobite forces outside the city began the famous Siege of Derry. For 105 days the city suffered appalling conditions as cannonballs and mortar-bombs rained down, and famine and disease took their terrible toll. Conditions for the besiegers were no better and many thousands of people died, both inside and outside the walls. The cannon used to defend the city can be seen on the walls and at other places around the city. Finally at the end of July, a relief ship broke the barricading 'boom' which had been stretched across the river, near where the new Foyle Bridge now stands. The Siege was over but it has left its mark on the traditions of the city to the present day (see Apprentice Boys of Derry).

== 18th and 19th centuries ==
The city was rebuilt in the 18th century with many of its fine Georgian style houses still surviving. George Berkeley, Ireland's most important philosopher, was dean of Derry (1724–33), and another well-known and eccentric cleric, Frederick Augustus Hervey, 4th Earl of Bristol, was Bishop of Derry (1768–1803). It was Hervey, the so-called Earl Bishop, who was responsible for building the city's first bridge across the River Foyle] in 1790. During the 18th and 19th centuries the port became an important embarkation point for Irish emigrants setting out for North America. Some of these founded the colony of Nutfield, later Londonderry, in the state of New Hampshire. By the middle of the 19th century, a thriving shirt and collarmaking industry had been established here, giving the city many of its fine industrial buildings. Four separate railway networks emanated from the city, the interesting history of which can be examined at the Foyle Valley Railway Centre. The city became a university city when its Magee College was incorporated into the Royal University of Ireland in 1880. Magee College continues university scholarship today, as a campus of the University of Ulster.

== Partition ==
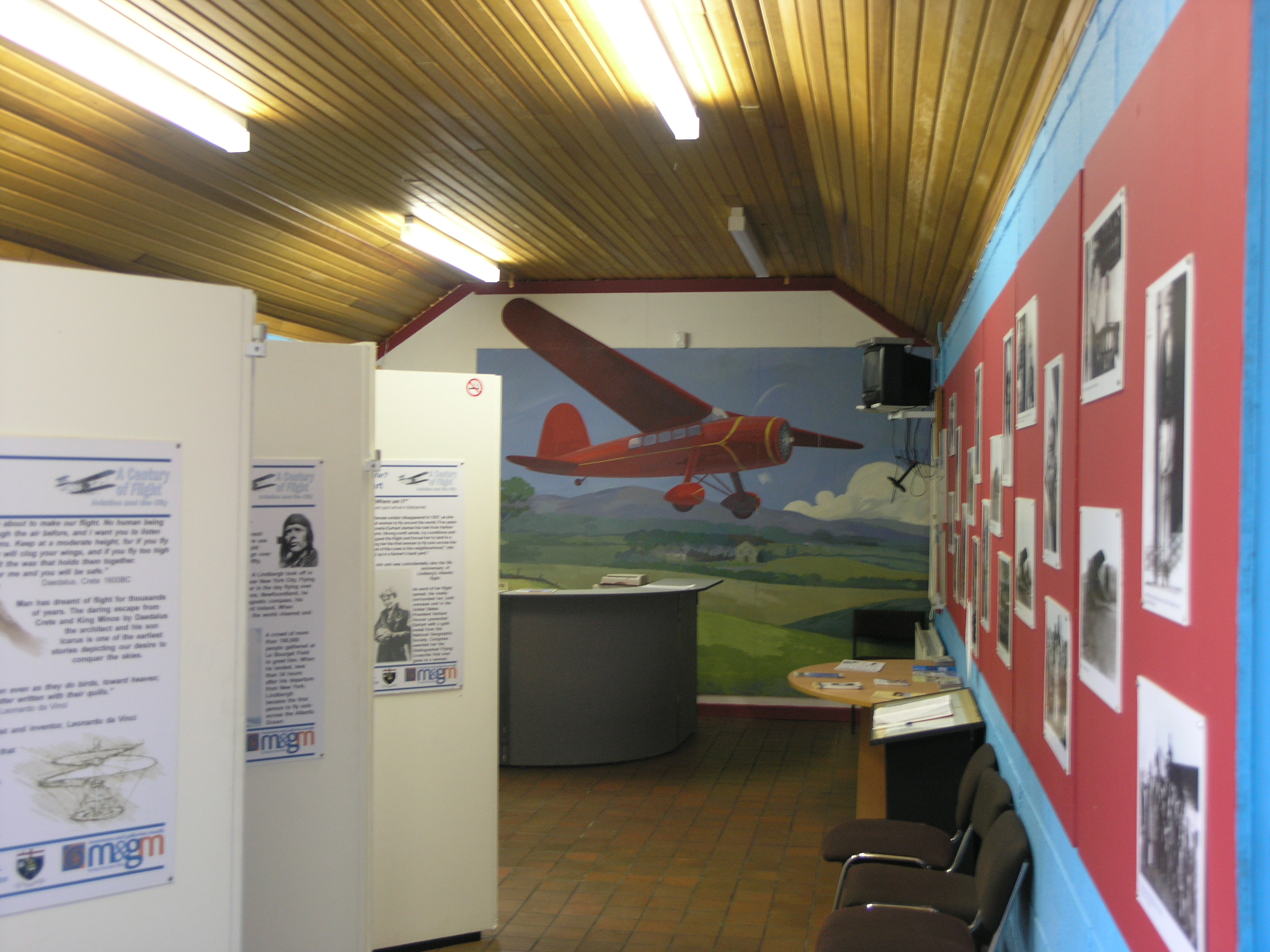
Amelia Earhart Cottage

The early 1920s in Ireland were marked by political violence over the issue of Irish independence. During the Irish War of Independence, Derry was rocked by sectarian violence, partly prompted by the guerrilla war raging between the Irish Republican Army and British Forces, but also influenced by economic and social pressures. In July 1920, several thousand unionist ex-British Army servicemen mobilised a pogrom of murder against the Catholic population which they regarded as rebellious. Severe rioting ensued when the loyalists murdered several Catholics and launched an assault on the neighbourhoods around the Long Tower and St Columb's College, now Lumen Christi. This pogrom was resisted by armed IRA members. Many lives were lost and in addition many Catholics and Protestants were expelled from their homes during the communal unrest. After a week's violence, the British Army intervened when local IRA and Catholic ex-servicemen began to dominate and an uneasy truce was negotiated by local politicians on either side.

In 1921, following the Anglo-Irish Treaty and the Partition of Ireland, Derry unexpectedly became a border city, with much of its natural economic hinterland in County Donegal cut off. Amelia Earhart gave the city a much needed boost when she landed here in 1932 becoming the first woman to fly solo across the Atlantic. Her connection with the city is reflected in a display at the Amelia Earhart Cottage at Ballyarnett.

During the Second World War the city played an important part in the Battle of the Atlantic with a substantial presence from the Royal Navy and a large number of GIs disembarked here. At the end of the war, 19 U-boats from the German Kriegsmarine surrendered in the city's harbour.

== The Troubles ==
Derry perceived itself as suffering under unionist government in Northern Ireland, both politically and economically. In the late 1960s the city became the flashpoint of disputes about institutional discrimination and gerrymandering. Despite having a nationalist majority the city was permanently controlled by unionists due to the partisan drawing of electoral boundaries. In addition the city had very high unemployment levels and very poor housing. Overcrowding in nationalist areas was widely blamed on the political agenda of the unionist government, who wanted to confine Catholics to a small number of electoral wards. Yet another contentious issue was the reluctance of the authorities to grant Derry the new University of Ulster, supported by a broad coalition led by the University for Derry Committee. The university was instead granted to the predominantly unionist town of Coleraine.

Civil rights demonstrations were declared illegal and then violently suppressed by the Royal Ulster Constabulary and Ulster Special Constabulary, and Catholics were regularly attacked after loyalist parades. The events that followed the August 1969 Apprentice Boys parade resulted in the Battle of the Bogside, when Catholic rioters fought the police, leading to widespread civil disorder in Northern Ireland and is often dated as the starting point of the Troubles.

The city is often regarded as "the cockpit of the Troubles". On Sunday 30 January 1972, 13 unarmed civilians were shot dead by British paratroopers during a civil rights march in the Bogside area. Another 13 were wounded and one further man later died of his wounds. This event came to be known as Bloody Sunday.

Because of these events, certain areas of Derry produced strong support for republican paramilitaries. Up to 1972, both the Provisional Irish Republican Army and Official IRA operated in the city. However, in 1972 the OIRA called a ceasefire following their unpopular killing a local 18-year-old who was on leave from the British Army. The PIRA, however, continued attacking security targets and bombing Derry's commercial centre. In the words of Eamonn McCann in his book, "War and an Irish Town", the city centre "looked as if it had been bombed from the air". Prominent among local Provisional IRA members was Martin McGuinness. After 1974, the smaller group, the Irish National Liberation Army also developed a presence in the city. In fact all three INLA prisoners that died in the 1981 Irish hunger strike were from Derry and County Londonderry.

The violence in Derry eased towards the end of the Troubles in the 1990s, even though street riots were still frequent, the violence gradually moved to Belfast at that time. Irish journalist Ed Maloney claims in The Secret History of the IRA that republican leaders there negotiated a de facto ceasefire in the city as early as 1991. Whether this is true or not, the city did see less bloodshed by this time than Belfast or other localities.

Derry has become known worldwide on account of the Troubles. Less well-known is its reputation voted by the Civic Trust in London as one of the ten best cities of its kind to live in, in the United Kingdom.

== See also ==
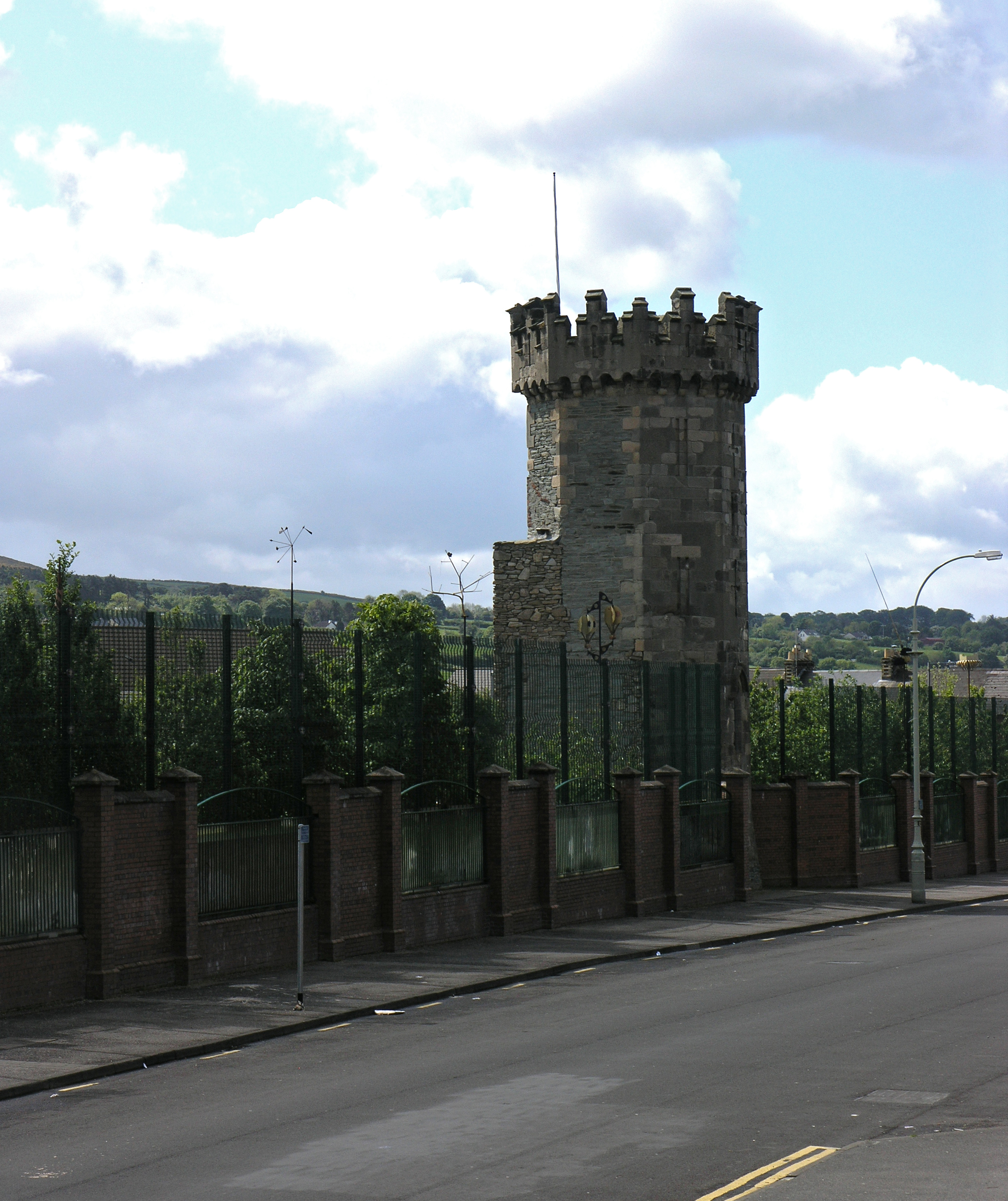
Last remaining tower of Derry Jail, Bishop Street Without, 2007

- History of Ireland
- History of Northern Ireland
- History of the United Kingdom
- Free Derry Corner
