= No-go area =

Term for areas considered off-limits or dangerous to enter

A "no-go area" or "no-go zone" is a term used in several distinct contexts to describe a geographic area considered off-limits or too dangerous to enter.

In its original military and political sense, the term refers to an area where state authorities have lost effective control, either because of official exclusion, such as a government-declared border zone or military exclusion zone, or because a violent non-state actor such as an insurgent group, terrorist organization, or criminal syndicate has established de facto control. In some cases, these areas have been held by insurgent organizations attempting to topple the government, such as Free Derry, an area in Northern Ireland that was held by the Irish Republican Army from 1969 to 1972. In other cases, the areas simply coexist alongside the state; an example is Kowloon Walled City, an area in Hong Kong essentially ruled by triad organizations from the 1950s to the 1970s.

Since the early 21st century, the term has also been used in political and media discourse to describe urban neighborhoods in Western countries that police or emergency services consider dangerous or difficult to operate in without backup. Government officials and journalists from various European countries, including France and Germany, have used the term to describe neighborhoods within their own countries. This usage is contested, generating significant debate over which areas, if any, are truly off-limits to police.

A further usage, promoted by some right-wing commentators and politicians, falsely claims that certain Western neighborhoods operate under sharia law and exclude non-Muslims. This claim has been widely debunked and retracted by major news outlets.

== Historical no-go areas ==
=== Hong Kong ===
With no government enforcement from the British colonial government aside from a few raids by the Hong Kong Police, the Kowloon Walled City became a haven for crime and drugs. It was only during a 1959 trial for a murder that occurred within the Walled City that the Hong Kong government was ruled to have jurisdiction there. By this time, however, the Walled City was virtually ruled by the organised crime syndicates known as Triads. Beginning in the 1950s, Triad groups such as the 14K and Sun Yee On gained a stranglehold on the Walled City's countless brothels, gambling parlors, and opium dens. The Walled City had become such a haven for criminals that police would venture into it only in large groups.

=== Mozambique ===
During the Mozambican War of Independence, the Mozambique Liberation Front (FRELIMO) set up and defended no-go "liberated zones" in the north of the country.

=== Northern Ireland ===
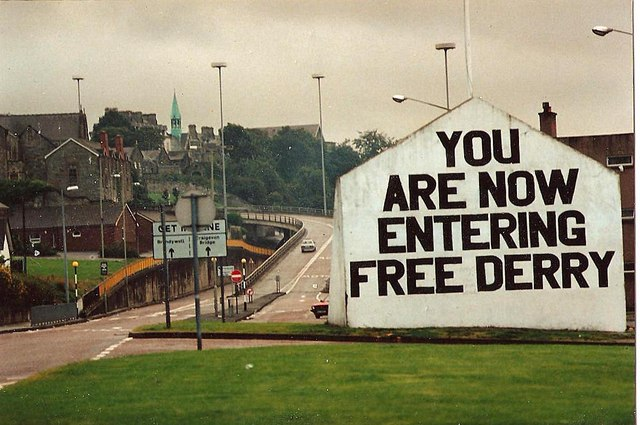
Free Derry Corner, the gable wall which once marked the entrance to Free Derry

During the Troubles, the term was applied to urban areas in Northern Ireland where the Royal Ulster Constabulary (RUC) and British Army could not operate openly. Between 1969 and 1972, Irish nationalist/republican neighborhoods in Belfast and Derry were sealed off with barricades by residents. The areas were policed by vigilantes and both Official and Provisional factions of the Irish Republican Army (IRA) operated openly. The most notable no-go area was called Free Derry.

The areas' existence was a challenge to the authority of the British government. On 31 July 1972, the British Army demolished the barricades and re-established control in Operation Motorman. It was the biggest British military operation since the Suez Crisis. Although the areas were no longer barricaded, they remained areas where the British security forces found it difficult to operate and were regularly attacked. As a result, they entered only in armored convoys and in certain circumstances, such as to launch house raids. Barricaded no-go areas across several settlements in the region were set up once again by nationalist and republican rioters when violence, supported by republican paramilitaries, erupted after the Drumcree Orange Order parade in July 1997, just days before the second and final Provisional IRA ceasefire. The RUC and the British Army were forced to withdraw under fire from several Belfast neighbourhoods. Police presence in these areas remained contentious into the 2000s as the main republican political party, Sinn Féin, refused to support the police. In 2007, however, the party voted to support the new Police Service of Northern Ireland (PSNI). In July 2007, the British Ministry of Defence published Operation Banner: An analysis of military operations in Northern Ireland, which assesses the Army's role in the Northern Ireland conflict; the paper acknowledges that, as late as 2006, there were still "areas of Northern Ireland out of bounds to soldiers".

=== Pakistan ===
The Federally Administered Tribal Areas (FATA) were in actuality no-go areas for the Pakistani authorities, where the Pakistani police could not enter. The situation was changed temporarily with the United States invasion of Afghanistan in 2001, when the Pakistani government was supported by U.S. military forces. Currently FATA are no longer a "no-go area" as they have been merged with the Khyber Pakhtunkhwa province.

=== Rhodesia ===
The term "no-go area" has a military origin and was first used in the context of the Bush War in Rhodesia. The war was fought in the 1960s and 1970s between the army of the predominantly white minority Rhodesian government and black nationalist groups.

The initial military strategy of the government was to seal the borders to prevent assistance to the guerrillas from other countries. However, with the end of Portuguese colonial rule in Angola and Mozambique, this became untenable and the white minority government adopted an alternative strategy ("mobile counter offensive"). This involved defending only key economic areas, transport links ("vital asset ground"), and the white civilian population. The government lost control of the rest of the country to the guerrilla forces, but carried out counter-guerrilla operations including "free-fire attacks" in the so-called "no-go areas," where white civilians were advised not to go.

=== Venezuela ===
"Peace zones", seen in red, which were planned to receive economic benefits to be given to former gang members who agreed to surrender their weapons to the government and cease their criminal activity

In 2013, the Venezuelan government negotiated with large criminal gangs on how to prevent violence and agreed to set up demilitarized areas as "peace zones". The concept behind the zones was to provide gang members with economic resources and construction materials in exchange for the surrender of the gang's weapons, with the understanding that the resources would be used to repair local infrastructure. The Venezuelan government hoped that through this process, gang members would disarm and become law-abiding and productive members of society. In addition, the then-deputy Minister of the Interior reportedly agreed verbally to avoid police patrols within the zones, should the gangs agree to disarm. The plan backfired as the gang members used the money and resources given to them by the government in exchange for their weapons to acquire more powerful weapons and began committing yet more crimes and violence within the zones. According to InSight Crime, there are over a dozen mega-gangs in Venezuela, with some having up to 300 members.

== Alleged contemporary no-go areas ==
=== Belgium ===
In the wake of the 2015 Paris attacks, the Molenbeek municipality in Brussels was described by Brice De Ruyver, a security adviser to Prime Minister Guy Verhofstadt, as a "no-go zone", where youths drawn to petty crime end up in conflict with police. Other academics, commentators, journalists and residents have contested the description of Molenbeek as a no-go zone.

=== Brazil ===
Some slum areas (known as favelas) in Brazil, most notably in Rio de Janeiro State, are controlled by gangs with automatic weapons. Police and investigative reporters have been tortured and killed there, such as Tim Lopes in 2002. Attempts at clearing up such areas have led to security crises in Rio as well as in the State of São Paulo. These organized crime organizations are known in Brazil as "Factions" (Facções in Portuguese), the two largest are the PCC (Primeiro Comando da Capital) or "First Command of the Capital" in English from São Paulo, and the Comando Vermelho (CV), "Red Command" in English, a faction from Rio de Janeiro.

=== France ===
It has been falsely claimed that France has Muslim-only no-go zones that are under sharia law.

An early usage of the term regarding Europe was in a 2002 opinion piece by David Ignatius in The New York Times, where he wrote about France, "Arab gangs regularly vandalize synagogues here, the North African suburbs have become no-go zones at night, and the French continue to shrug their shoulders." Ignatius said the violence resulting in the no-go zone had come about due to inequality and racism directed towards French people of colour. La Courneuve, a poverty-stricken municipality (commune) in the Paris region whose residents felt the authorities had neglected them due to racism, was described by police as a no-go zone for officers without reinforcements.

In 2010, Raphaël Stainville of French newspaper Le Figaro called certain neighborhoods of the southern city Perpignan "veritable lawless zones", saying they had become too dangerous to travel in at night. He added that the same was true in parts of Béziers and Nîmes. In 2012, Gilles Demailly, the mayor of the French city Amiens, in the wake of several riots, called the northern part of his city a lawless zone, where one could no longer order a pizza or call for a doctor. The head of a local association said institutional violence had contributed to the tensions resulting in the no-go zone. In 2014, Fabrice Balanche, a scholar of the Middle East, labelled the northern city of Roubaix, as well as parts of Marseille, "mini-Islamic states", saying that the authority of the state is completely absent there. In 2005 France's domestic intelligence network, the Renseignements Generaux, identified 150 "no-go zones" around the country where police would not enter without reinforcements. Christopher Dickey, writing in Newsweek, said the situation had arisen due to racism towards immigrants.

In January 2015, after the Charlie Hebdo shooting in Paris, various American media, including the news cable channels Fox News and CNN, described the existence of no-go zones across Europe and in France in particular. Both networks were criticized for these statements, and anchors on both networks later apologized for the mistaken characterizations. The mayor of Paris, Anne Hidalgo, said that she intended to sue Fox News for its statements. After complaints Fox News issued an apology, saying that there was "no credible information to support the assertion there are specific areas in these countries that exclude individuals based solely on their religion." Berkshire Eagle columnist Donald Morrison, writing in The New Republic in the wake of the shooting, wrote that "the word banlieue ("suburb") now connotes a no-go zone of high-rise slums, drug-fueled crime, failing schools and poor, largely Muslim immigrants and their angry offspring" and that France has not succeeded in integrating minorities into national life.

=== Germany ===
A sociology paper published in 2009 said that right-wing extremists had been discussing the creation of no-go areas in Western Europe since the 1980s. It described attempts to create "national liberated zones" (national befreite Zonen) in Germany: "'no-go-areas', which are areas dominated by neo-Nazis," attributing their appeal in the former DDR to "the unmet promises of modernisation and the poor socio-cultural conditions that offer no perspectives to young people". Whether or not Germany actually had no-go zones was disputed: the paper concluded "according to ... state officials, the police and other relevant institutions, [the phenomenon of no-go zones] does not actually exist ... by contrast, the national press in Germany, various civic associations, and also experts acknowledge and give examples of the existence of no-go areas."

In a February 2018 interview, German Chancellor Angela Merkel stated that there are no-go areas in Germany, saying, "There are such areas and one has to call them by their name and do something about them." This came in the context of arguing for a zero-tolerance policy in German policing.

A 2023 article about Berlin defined "no-go zones for Jews" as "city areas Jews should avoid to reduce the likelihood of being attacked ... inner-city districts in which Jews are recommended not to identify as Jews". In 2024, The Telegraph reported that Barbara Slowik, Berlin Chief of Police, said that visibly Jewish and gay people should "be more careful". In the same interview, Slowik said that violent crimes against Jewish people were "few and far between". The New Arab reported that Slowik had been criticized for mis-categorizing crimes as anti-semitic when the victims were not Jewish but where the circumstances of the crime involved criticism of Israel and said that German police regularly ignored complaints of Islamophobic violence despite a 113% increase in such crimes in 2023.

=== Kenya ===
In Kenya, the ongoing conflict in Somalia, where the terrorist organization al-Shabaab controls territory, has severely affected the security situation even on the Kenyan side of the border. There have been terrorist attacks and kidnappings in Kenya followed by a Kenyan intervention, Operation Linda Nchi, and police crackdowns. These have affected counties bordering Somalia and in Nairobi, the suburb of Eastleigh, which is inhabited mostly by Somalis. By 2004, Eastleigh was described as a no-go zone for Kenyan authorities after dark.

=== Israel and Palestine ===
The Israeli Defence Forces (IDF) maintains a border zone on the Gaza Strip and declares "no-go zones", where they may use lethal force to enforce the security exclusion zone. An IDF spokesman said that "residents of the Gaza Strip are required not to come any closer than 300 meters from the security fence", although there is some allowance for farmers to approach up to 100 meters if they do so on foot only. The United Nations Office for the Coordination of Humanitarian Affairs said that the no-go zones include about 30% of the arable land in the Gaza strip, and a small number of residents farm in the exclusion zones despite the risk of military action. Unlike a legal border zone, the no-go zone is declared unilaterally in occupied territory, without acknowledgement or cooperation of Palestinian authorities, and as such can be considered a disputed no-go zone. It is considered unlawful by the Swedish organization Diakonia.

=== South Africa ===
The term "no-go zone" has been informally applied to high-crime neighborhoods in South African cities. In South Africa, the apartheid policy created segregated neighborhoods where whites risked being removed or victimized in black-only neighborhoods and vice versa. Because of the bantustan system, many urban inhabitants lived in the city illegally per apartheid laws. For example, in Cape Town, Cape Flats was a neighborhood where many of those evicted were relocated. It became a "no-go area", as it was controlled by criminal gangs. However, many of these areas have seen significant gentrification; for example, Woodstock in Cape Town can no longer be described as a no-go zone. In 2010, a housing complex comprising a number of city blocks in Atlantis, Western Cape were described as a "no-go zone for police conducting raids", and ambulances could not enter without police escort. In 2014, the situation had improved, and following convictions of several gang members, a police official said that "legislation concerning organised crime was beginning to work". In 2018, a gang war in Parkwood, Cape Town was reported to have turned the area into a "no-go zone", although a minister visited the area to ensure policing continues.

=== United States ===
Some conservative American political figures, including Tony Perkins and Jim Newberger, have falsely claimed that some communities within the United States are either governed by Sharia law or are Muslim-controlled no-go zones.

Some occupation protests in the U.S. connected with the George Floyd protests have been described as exclusionary zones. In Seattle in June 2020, the Capitol Hill Autonomous Zone was established as a "No Cop Co-op". In Minneapolis, the George Floyd Square occupied protest persisted for over a year, until June 20, 2021, and was described as "a police free zone".

== See also ==
- Alsatia
- Bantustan
- Chernobyl Exclusion Zone
- Closed city
- Demilitarized zone
- Exclusionary zoning
- Fukushima exclusion zone
- Geographical segregation
- Ghetto
- Vulnerable residential area (Denmark) (Danish: Udsat boligområde)
- Hot zone (environment)
- LGBT-free zone
- Lazaretto
- No man's land
- Pirate republic
- Red-light district
- Sanctuary
- Sundown town
- Vulnerable area (Swedish: Utsatt område)
- Zone interdite, two distinct territories established in German-occupied France during World War II
