= Operation Motorman =

1972 British operation in Northern Ireland

- Part of the Troubles and Operation Banner
- Location: Belfast; Derry; Newry; Armagh; Lurgan; Coalisland
- Planned by: Major-General Robert Ford
- Objective: Retake republican-controlled areas
- Date: 04:00, 31 July 1972 (+01:00)
- Executed by: British Army (22,000); Ulster Defence Regiment (5,300); Royal Air Force
- Outcome: British victory: Operation against the IRA succeeds.; Free Derry dissolved
- Casualties: Civilians: 1 killed 2 wounded; Provisional IRA: 1 killed

Operation Motorman was a large operation carried out by the British Army (HQ Northern Ireland) in Northern Ireland during the Troubles. The operation took place in the early hours of 31 July 1972 with the aim of retaking the "no-go areas" (areas controlled by residents, including Irish republican paramilitaries) that had been established in Belfast and other urban centres. In Derry, Operation Carcan (or Car Can), initially proposed as a separate operation, was executed as part of Motorman.

== Background ==
The Northern Ireland riots of August 1969 marked the beginning of the conflict known as the Troubles. As a result of the riots, Northern Ireland's two main cities, Belfast and Derry, had become more segregated than before. Many neighbourhoods became entirely Irish nationalist or entirely unionist. In some places, residents and paramilitaries built barricades to seal off and protect their neighbourhoods from incursions by "the other side", the security forces or both. These became known as "no-go areas".

By the end of 1971, 29 barricades were in place to block access to what was known as Free Derry, 16 of them impassable even to the British Army's one-ton armoured vehicles. Many of the nationalist no-go areas were controlled by one of the two factions of the Irish Republican Army, the Provisional IRA and Official IRA. On 29 May 1972, the Official IRA called a ceasefire and vowed that it would not launch attacks except in self-defence.

On 21 July 1972, in the space of 75 minutes, the Provisional IRA detonated 22 bombs in Belfast. Nine people (including two soldiers and a loyalist volunteer) were killed and 130 were injured. The attack prompted the British Government to implement Operation Motorman, just ten days later.

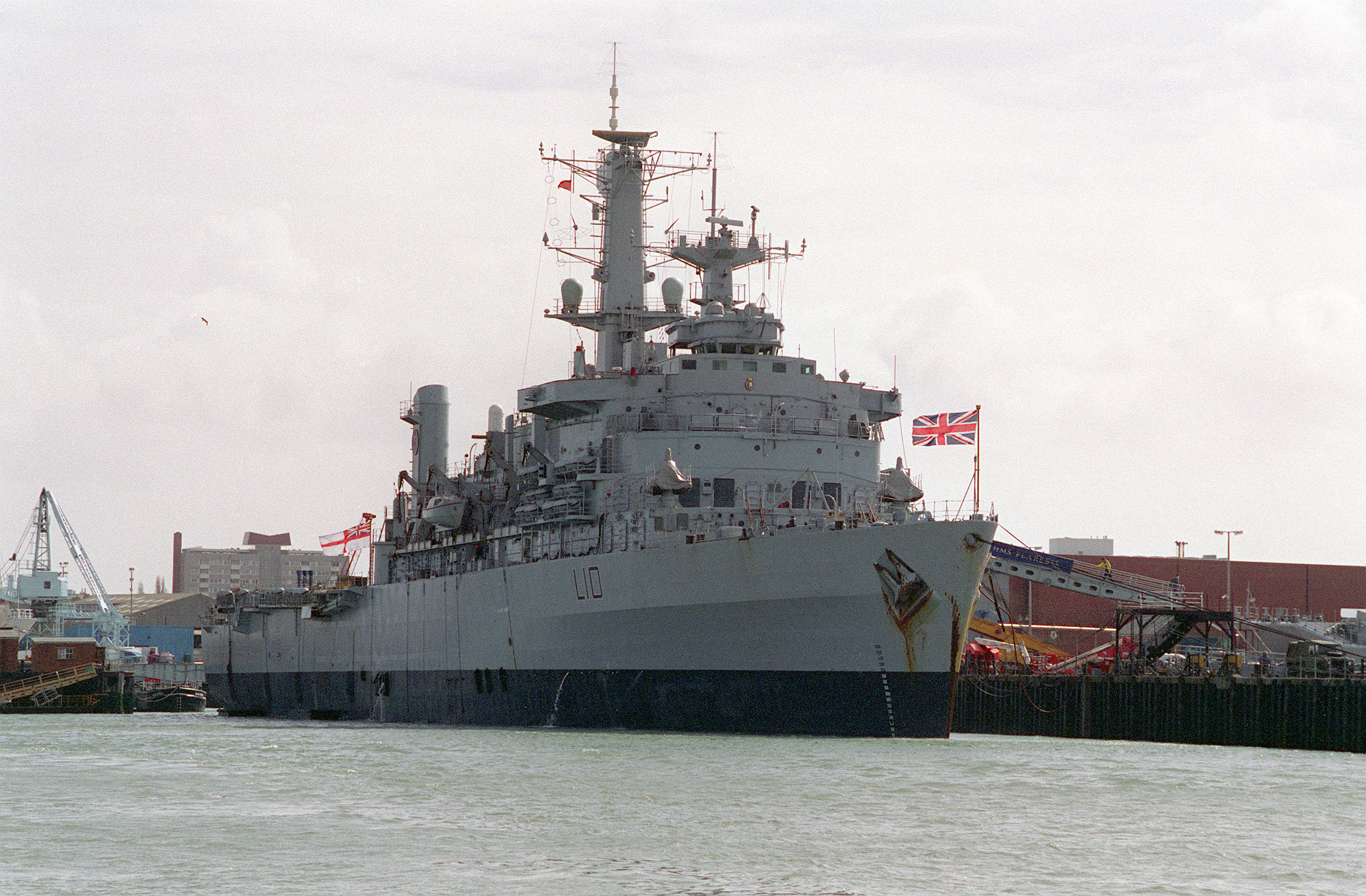
HMS Fearless landed troops and armoured engineering vehicles at Derry

== Preparations ==
Operation Motorman was the biggest British military operation since the Suez Crisis of 1956 and the biggest in Ireland since the Irish War of Independence. In the days before 31 July, about 4,000 extra troops were brought into Northern Ireland. Almost 22,000 soldiers were involved, including 27 infantry and two armoured battalions, aided by 5,300 soldiers from the local Ulster Defence Regiment (UDR). Several Centurion AVRE demolition vehicles, derived from the Centurion tank and fitted with bulldozer blades, were used. They were the only heavy armoured vehicles to be deployed operationally by the British Army in Northern Ireland during the Troubles. The AVREs had been transported to Northern Ireland on board the amphibious landing ship HMS Fearless, and were operated with their turrets traversed to the rear and main guns covered by tarpaulins.

This quick military buildup alerted the Provisional IRA and Official IRA that a major operation was being planned. According to local MP Ivan Cooper and others, the IRA left Derry's no-go areas the day before the operation.

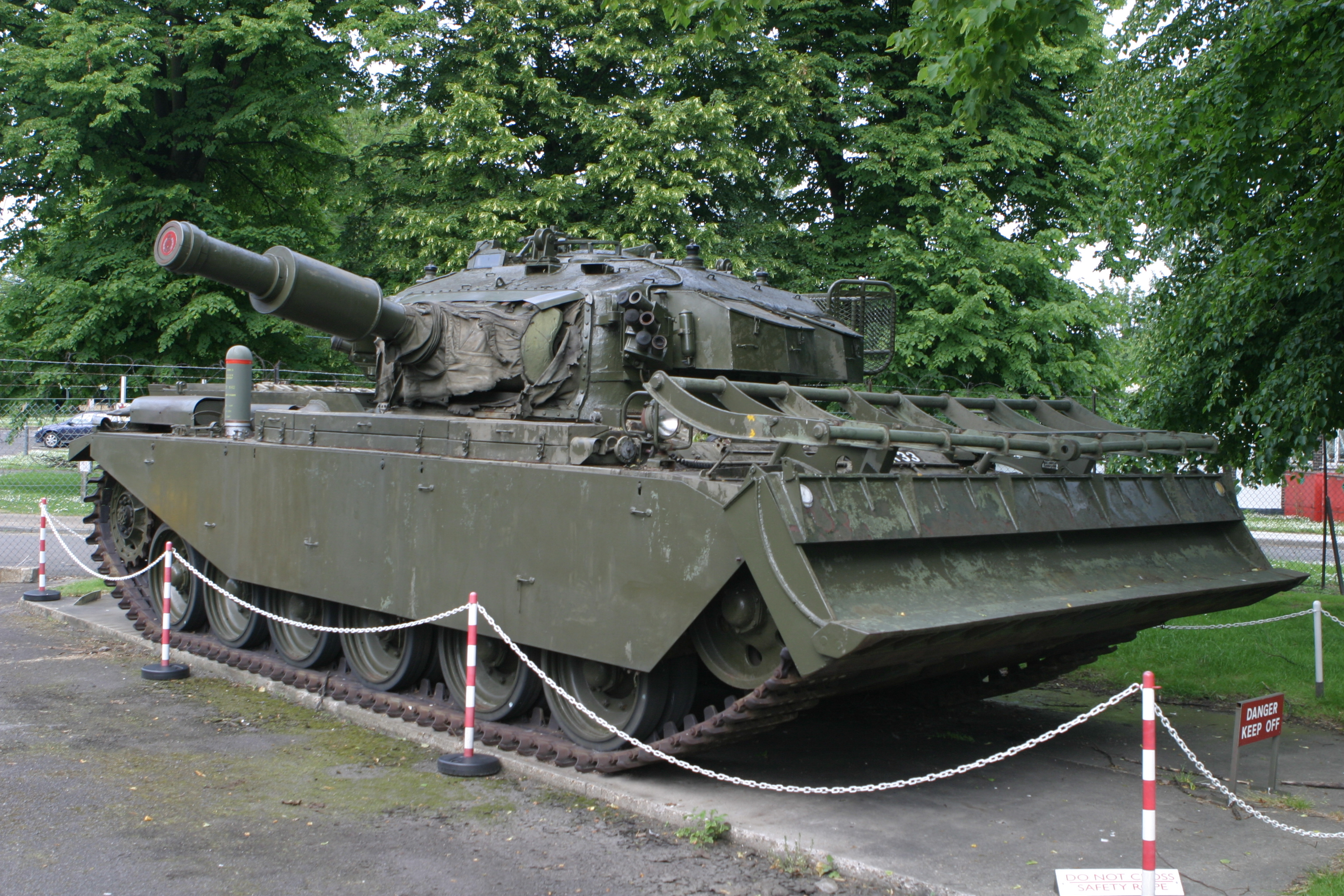
A Centurion AVRE, as used by the Army in Operation Motorman (Exhibit at the Royal Engineers Museum, Kent)

== Operation ==
The operation began at about 4:00 a.m. on 31 July and lasted for a few hours. In "no-go areas" such as Free Derry, sirens were sounded by residents to alert others of the incursion. The British Army used bulldozers and Centurion AVREs to break through the barricades before flooding the no-go areas with troops in smaller, lighter armoured vehicles. Neither the Provisional IRA nor Official IRA attempted to hold their ground. Small-scale operations were carried out in other places like Lurgan, Armagh, Coalisland and Newry. RAF Canberra reconnaissance aircraft were employed to search for arms dumps through false colour imaging.

By the end of the day, Derry and Belfast had been cleared of no-go areas, but the Army remained cautious when operating in staunchly republican districts. Casement Park in Andersonstown, the main stadium of the Ulster GAA, was occupied by 19th Regiment Royal Artillery; it was returned in 1973/4.

=== Casualties ===
During the operation, the British Army shot four people in Derry, killing a civilian and an unarmed IRA member.

- Daniel Hegarty, a 15-year-old Catholic civilian, was shot along with his two cousins as they walked along Creggan Heights in Derry. The boys had gone out to watch the operation unfold. The shots were fired from close range by soldiers, who had hidden themselves behind a garden fence. Hegarty was shot twice in the head and was killed outright. One of his cousins, Christopher Hegarty, survived being struck in the head by a bullet. While the British government initially maintained that no crime had been committed by the soldiers involved, following the Good Friday Agreement, the case was re-opened, and in 2011 a jurors' inquest unanimously concluded that neither Hegarty boy had posed a threat when they were fired upon. Despite these findings, action was slow and in 2016 it was announced that the soldier involved, known publicly only as "Soldier B" in order to protect his identity, would not face charges related to Daniel's killing. In 2018, the High Court reversed this decision however and in 2019, 47 years later, Soldier B, the individual who personally fired the fatal shots into Daniel Hegarty, was charged with murder. In the summer of 2021, all charges against Soldier B related to the shooting of the Hegartys were dropped, after key prosecution evidence was held to be inadmissible. This decision was overturned in June 2023, with the High Court of Justice ruling that the decision to drop the charges was "erroneous" and that Soldier B should face prosecution, but Soldier B died in September 2023 before he could be tried.
- Seamus Bradley, a 19-year-old Provisional IRA member, was shot dead by a British soldier. The army claimed that he was armed with a machine gun and had climbed a tree in Bishop's Field, Derry before being shot. An investigation concluded in August 2019 that Bradley's death was unjustified as he was unarmed and running across a ground while he was shot. The investigating coroner judge also ruled that Bradley could have survived had he been administered first aid or transported quickly to a hospital. The Ministry of Defence appealed against the verdict but withdrew it in October 2021.

In Belfast, some arrests were made but no armed resistance was met.

== Aftermath ==
A few hours after the conclusion of Operation Motorman, the IRA bombed Claudy. Nine civilians were killed when three car bombs exploded on the Main Street of Claudy village, County Londonderry. Five of the victims were Catholic and four were Protestant.

In the following years, the territory of the Republic of Ireland continued to offer a safe haven for IRA members, who used the country to undertake legal and illegal venues for raising funds, to train new recruits and to flee across the border, where British security forces could not follow.
