= Free Derry Corner =

Irish historical landmark

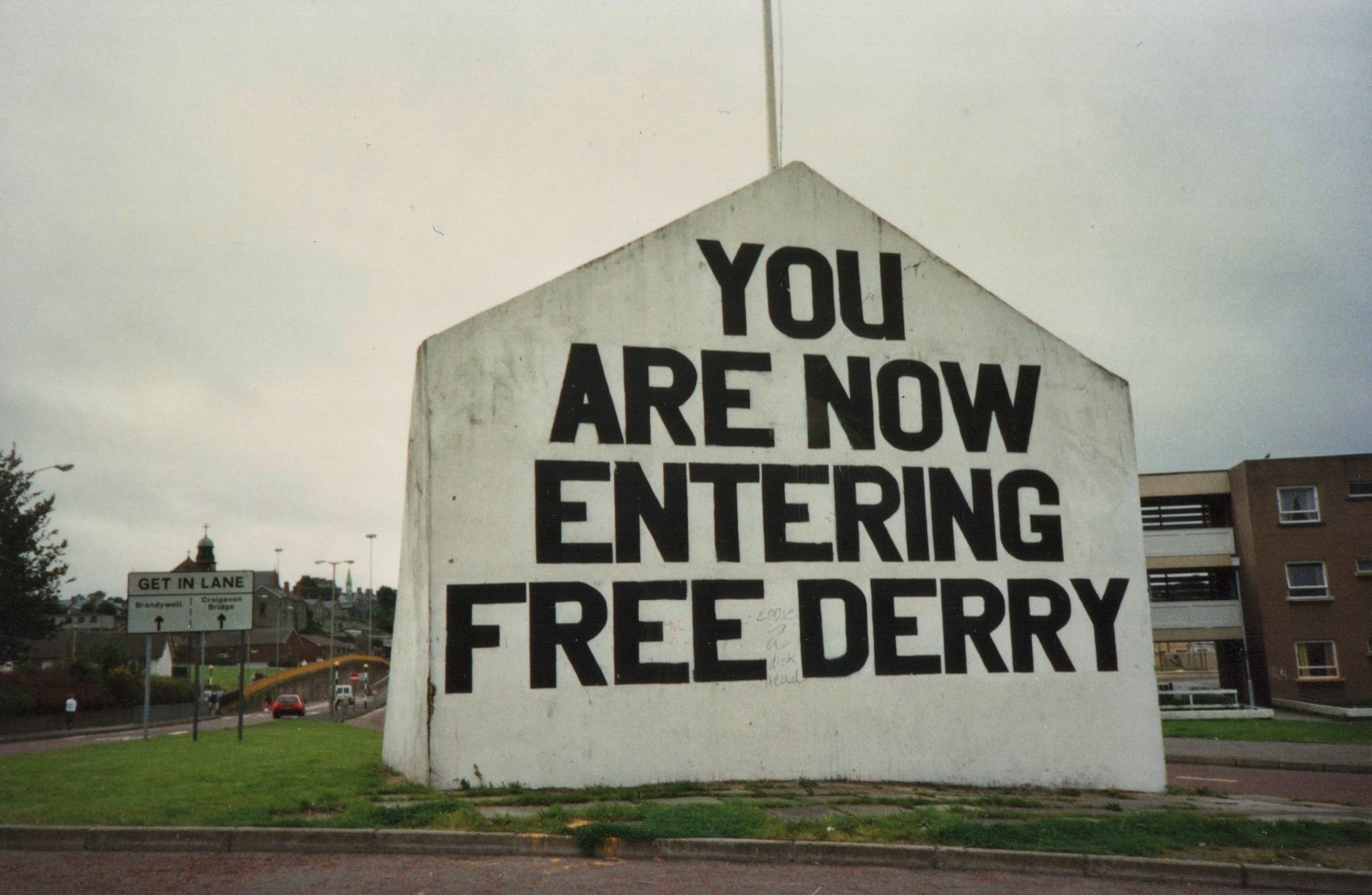
- Free Derry Corner in 1990
- Interactive map of Free Derry Corner
- Coordinates: 54°59′44.8″N 07°19′36.4″W

Free Derry Corner is a historical landmark in the Bogside neighbourhood of Derry, Northern Ireland, which lies in the intersection of the Lecky Road, Rossville Street and Fahan Street. A free-standing gable wall commemorates Free Derry, a self-declared autonomous nationalist area of Derry that existed between 1969 and 1972.

On 5 January 1969, local activist Liam Hillen painted graffiti on a gable wall at the end of a housing terrace stating "You are now entering Free Derry".

Civil rights activist and writer Eamonn McCann stated: "That phrase, 'You are now entering Free Derry', I take credit for that. It's not an original phrase but it was I who devised it on the night in question and had it put up on the wall, and that's the most enduring thing I've ever written: You are now entering Free Derry. That came from Berkeley in California in 1956 [recte 1964] in a Berkeley Free Speech Movement ... And there was a student occupation of Berkeley College ... In the entrance to Berkeley College there was a big sign that said 'You are now entering Free Berkeley' from the Free Speech Movement, and I said, Well that's cool, and then when we came to Derry, I had that put up on that gable wall."

When the British home secretary James Callaghan visited Derry in August 1969, the "Free Derry" wall was painted white and the "You are now entering Free Derry" wording was professionally re-painted in black lettering by John "Caker" Casey. The wall and the area in front of it became known as Free Derry Corner by the inhabitants. Free Derry Corner, Rossville flats, and the surrounding streets were the scene of the Battle of the Bogside in 1969 and Bloody Sunday in 1972.

The houses on Lecky Road and Fahan Street were subsequently demolished, but the wall was retained. As currently situated, it now lies in the central reservation of Lecky Road, which was upgraded to a dual carriageway some time following the demolition of the original terraced houses. Also on the reservation are memorials to the 1981 hunger strikers and to those who died engaging in paramilitary activity as part of the Provisional IRA's Derry Brigade. On nearby walls can be seen various murals – part of The People's Gallery by the Bogside Artists. The wall itself is frequently repainted to reflect various causes, both international and local.

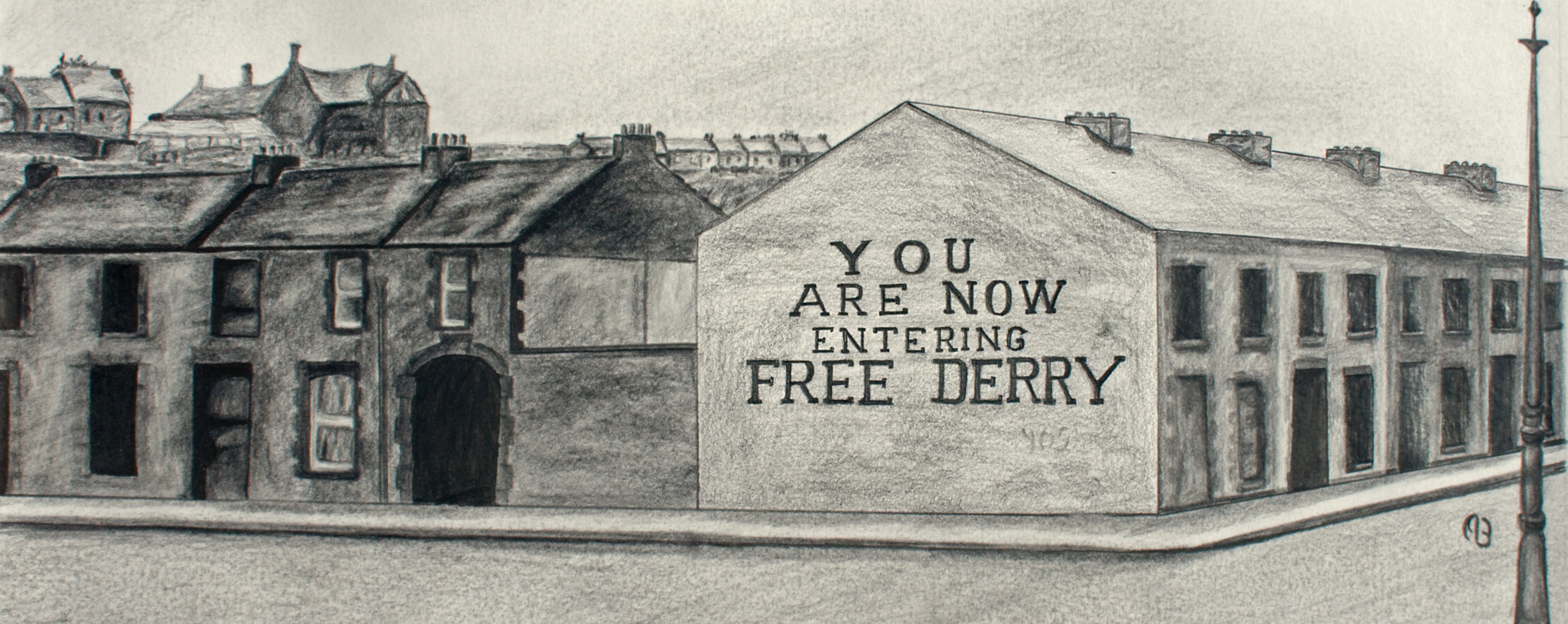
Artist's rendition of the corner as it appeared in 1969. The terraced houses were demolished shortly afterwards, but the wall with the slogan was retained.

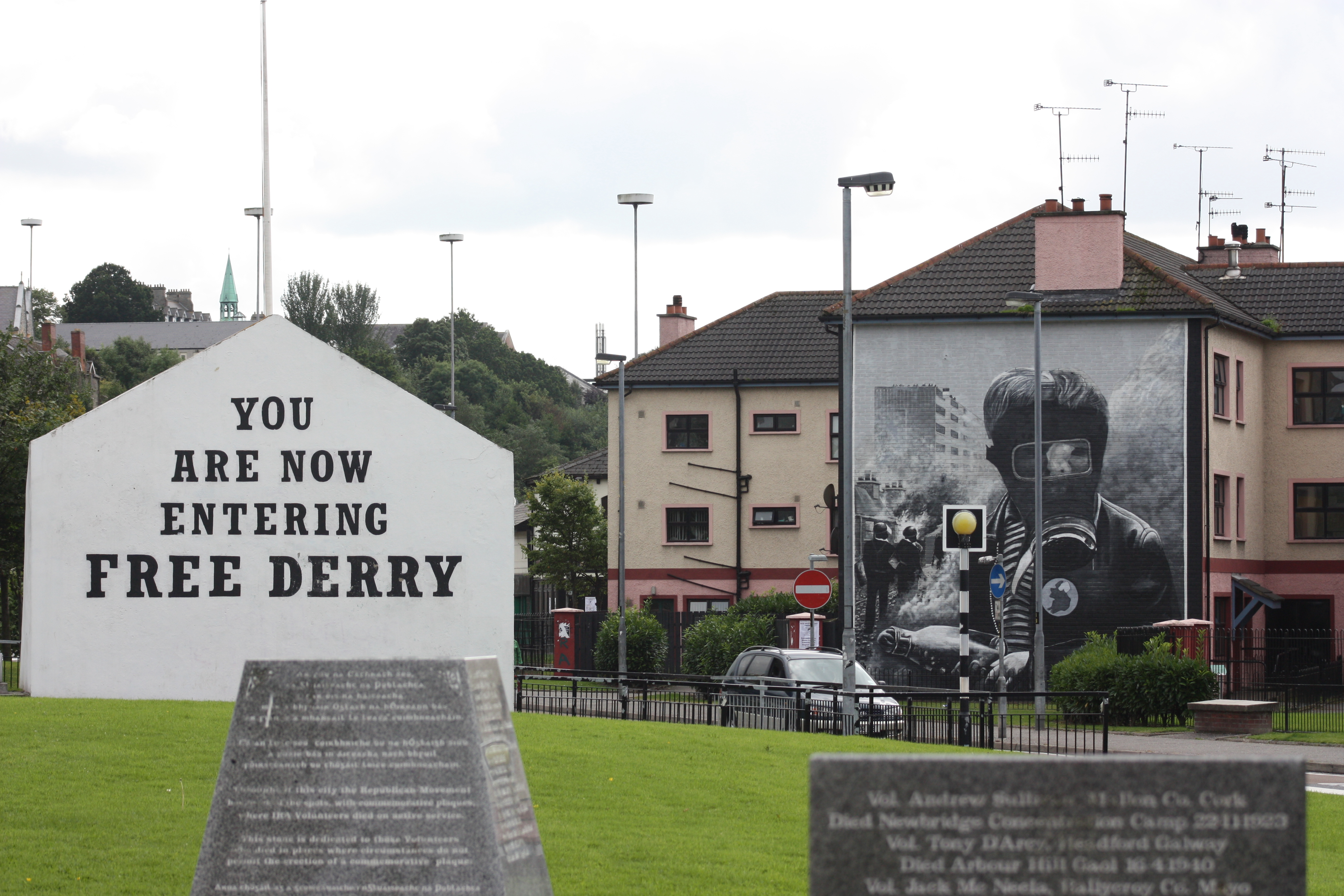
View of the corner from the Hunger Strike memorial, showing the "petrol bomber" mural.

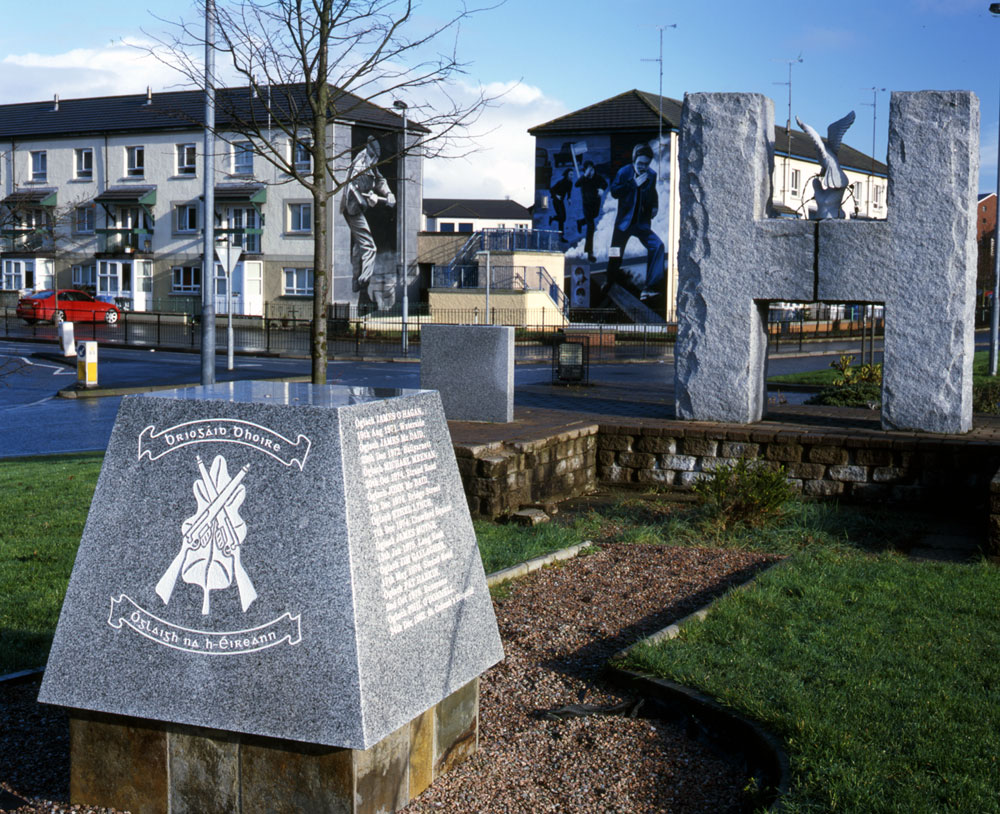
The Hunger Strike memorial, which faces the Free Derry wall.

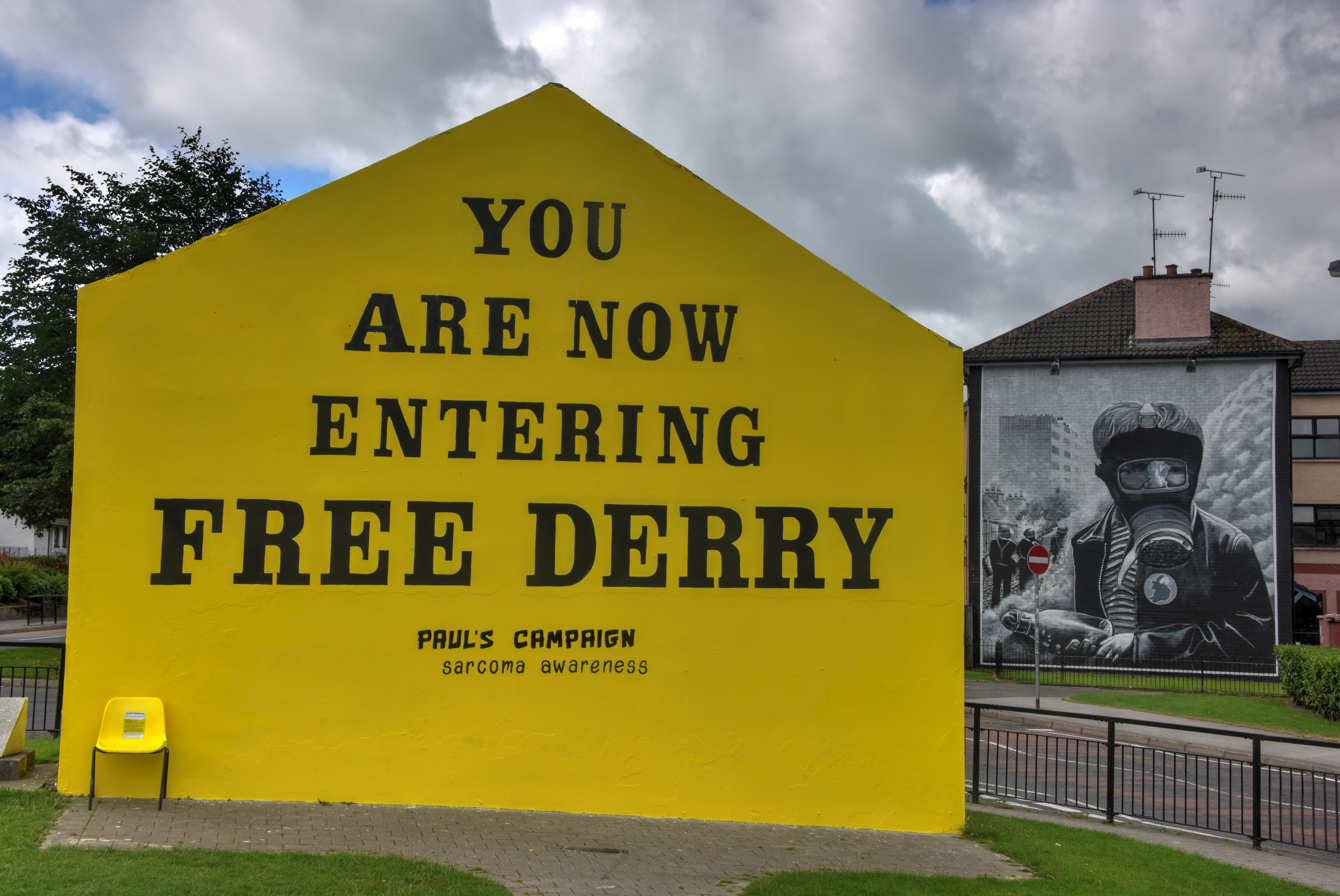
The Free Derry wall in 2018, painted yellow as part of a campaign to raise awareness about sarcoma.
