= The Troubles in Derry =

Northern Ireland conflict in Derry

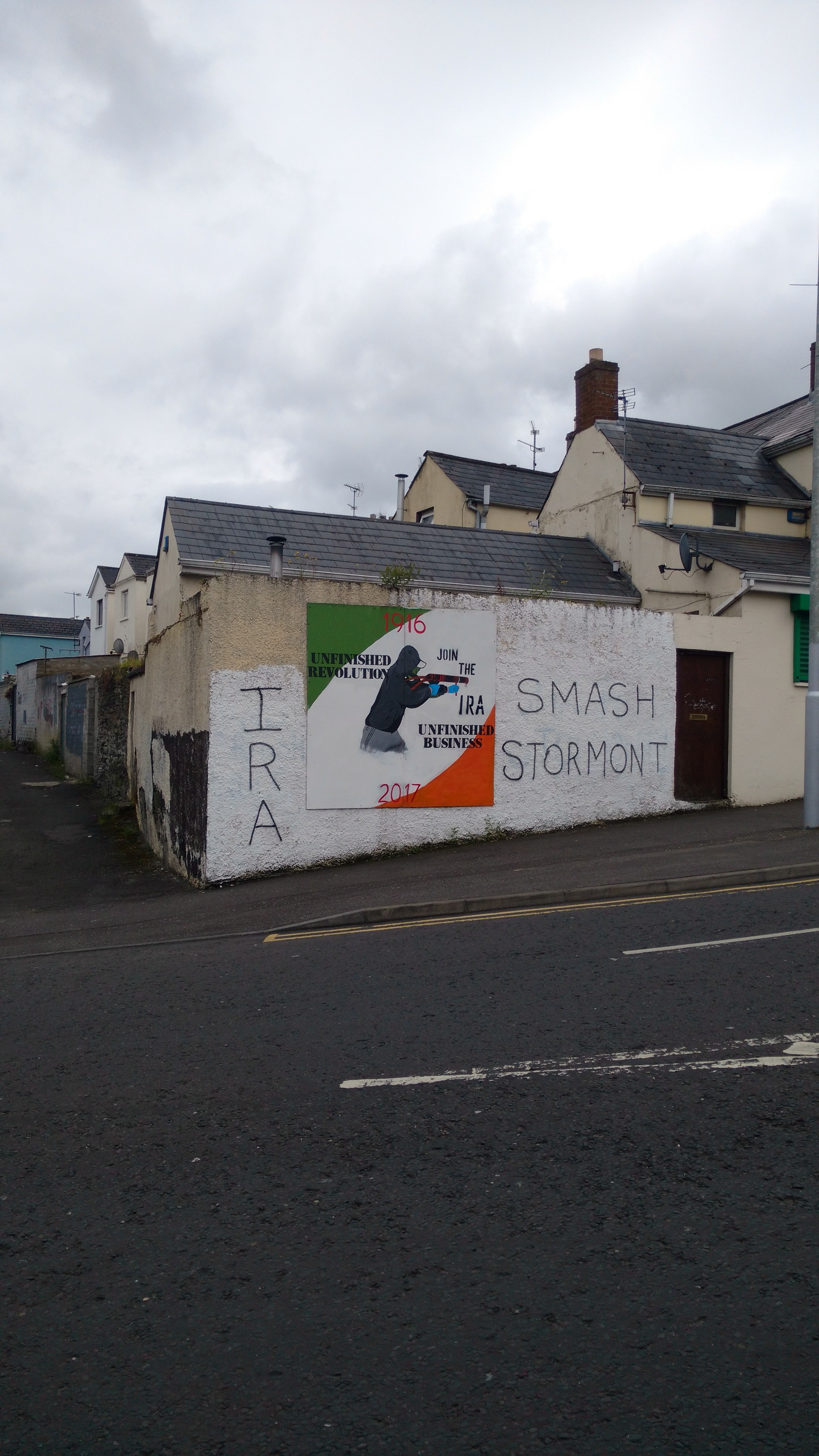
Mural in a Catholic Neighbourhood in Derry, taken in June of 2017

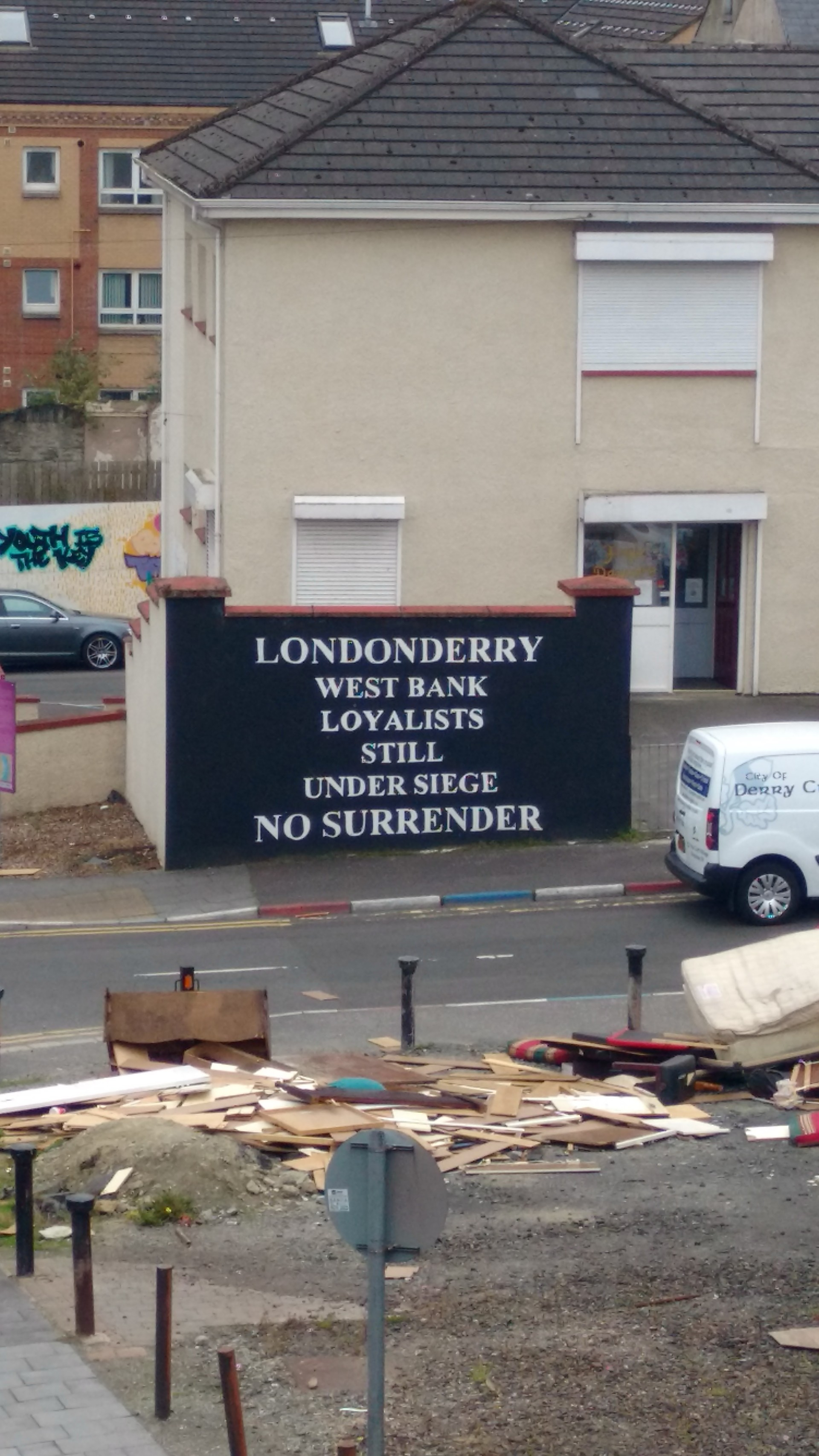
Mural in a loyalist Neighbourhood in Derry, taken in June of 2017

The city of Derry, Northern Ireland, was severely affected by the Troubles. The conflict is widely considered to have begun in the city, with many regarding the Battle of the Bogside (an inner suburb of the city) in 1969 as the beginning of the Troubles. The Bloody Sunday incident of 1972 occurred in Derry, in the Bogside area.

== Background ==
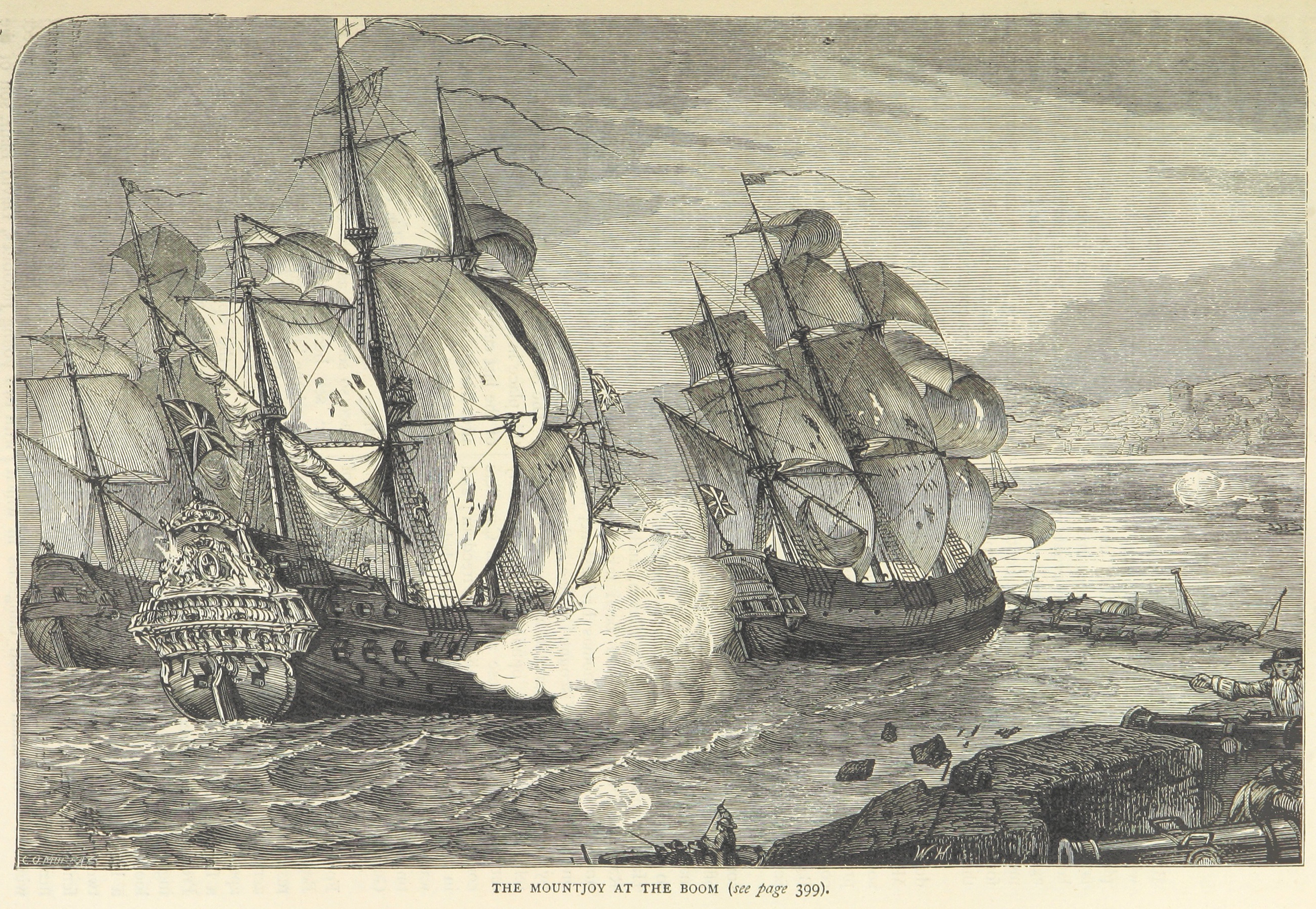
HMS Dartmouth and Mountjoy broke the siege of Derry in late July 1689

Derry has a long history of sectarian tension and violence. In particular, the city became a refuge for Protestants during the 1641 Rebellion when thousands of Protestants were massacred by Catholics. In 1689 the Siege of Derry took place, which resulted from the attempt by the Catholic Lord Deputy of Ireland, Richard Talbot, Earl of Tyrconnell, a supporter of the dethroned Catholic James II, to install a Catholic garrison in the then majority Protestant city. The siege lasted for 105 days before the forces of the Protestant William III broke the siege. The siege became an icon of Ulster Protestant culture, and since the early nineteenth century has been annually commemorated by the Apprentice Boys of Derry. Although Catholics had previously participated in ceremonies in honour of the Williamite victory, many regarded the Apprentice Boys' celebrations, particularly their parades, as triumphalist and sectarian. In the mid-nineteenth century an investigation into riots in the city resulted in the recommendation that the Apprentice Boys' parades be banned. Despite the opposition of the British government, the parades continued.

When Northern Ireland became a separate state in 1922, Protestants/unionists were the majority and controlled the government of Northern Ireland. Although Catholics were a clear majority of the city of Derry population, severe gerrymandering meant that unionists controlled the city government. Like councils elsewhere (nationalist as well as unionist, although unionists controlled more councils), unionist local politicians used their power to disproportionately allocate jobs and houses to Protestants. Although working-class people from both communities suffered from poor housing and unemployment, Catholics were significantly more likely to live in crowded and generally inadequate housing and to lack jobs. In particular, working-class Catholics were concentrated in the Bogside, an overcrowded suburb under the city walls. The housing situation was caused in part by unionist politicians wishing to keep Catholics concentrated in a small number of electoral wards, thus confining the nationalist vote to these wards. It was also felt that the Northern Irish government favoured the predominantly Protestant east of the statelet over the predominantly Catholic west. Both Protestant and Catholic residents of Derry were angered by issues such as the reduction of rail services and the siting of the University of Ulster in Coleraine rather than Derry - opposed by the broad-based University for Derry Committee which included several senior English intellectuals - but Catholics also saw this as sectarian discrimination.

== Civil rights and city riots ==
In the late 1960s, several groups were formed to campaign against discrimination against Catholics. These included the Northern Ireland Civil Rights Association (NICRA) and the Derry Housing Action Committee. These groups had strong links with nationalist and republican groups and although their focus was on rectifying injustice rather than abolishing partition, they were seen by many unionists as a front for republicanism. On 5 October 1968 these groups organised a march through the centre of Derry. Because of the political and sectarian connotations of parades in Northern Ireland, loyalists saw this as a republican claim on their iconic city, and the demonstration was banned. The marchers went ahead anyway and were batoned by the Royal Ulster Constabulary (RUC). Further mass demonstrations and marches carried on in and around Derry, despite rising tension and sporadic bans.

In January 1969, a march by the radical group People's Democracy from Belfast to Derry was attacked by loyalists at Burntollet, 5 miles (8 km) outside Derry. When the marchers (many of whom were injured) arrived in Derry on 5 January, rioting broke out between their supporters and the RUC, who were seen to have failed to protect the march. That night, RUC members broke into homes in the Catholic Bogside area and assaulted several residents. An inquiry led by Lord Cameron concluded that, "a number of policemen were guilty of misconduct, which involved assault and battery, malicious damage to property...and the use of provocative sectarian and political slogans". After this point, barricades were set up in the Bogside and vigilante patrols organised to keep the RUC out. It was at this point that famous mural with the slogan "You are now entering Free Derry" was painted on the corner of Columbs street by a local activist named John Casey.

In April, the first fatal attack arising out of the violence between nationalists and the RUC in Derry occurred. A local man, Samuel Devenny, was badly beaten with batons by RUC members who broke into his home after a riot in the Bogside on 19 April 1969. His teenage daughters were also beaten in the attack. Devenny died from his injuries on 17 July and is sometimes referred to as the first victim of the Troubles.

After further rioting on 12 July ("The Twelfth"), arising out of the Orange Order parades on that day, republicans in Derry set up the Derry Citizens Defence Association (DCDA), with the intention of preparing for future disturbances. The members of the DCDA were initially Republican Club (and possibly IRA) activists, but they were joined by many other left-wing activists and local people. This group stated their aim as firstly to keep the peace, but if this failed, to organise the defence of the Bogside. To this end, they stockpiled materials for barricades and missiles, ahead of the Apprentice Boys march on 12 August.

== The Battle of the Bogside ==
The Apprentice Boys annually paraded on 12 August to commemorate the lifting of the Siege of Derry. During the 1969 parade, the extreme tension of the time meant that trouble was widely expected, but the Apprentice Boys and similar groups had significant political power and the march was not banned; it is also likely that any such ban would not have been effective. As the parade passed the Catholic Bogside area, stones were thrown by both sides. This escalated into a battle between Bogside residents and their supporters on one side and police and loyalists on the other. Petrol bombs and other missiles thrown by rioters were met by CS gas and batons from the police, with innocent residents inevitably suffering. Rioting spread to Belfast, leaving six people dead. After two days of nearly continuous rioting, the Prime Minister of Northern Ireland, James Chichester-Clarke, took the unprecedented step of requesting the British Prime Minister Harold Wilson for troops to be sent to Derry. Soon afterwards a company of the Prince of Wales Own Regiment relieved the police, with orders to separate the RUC and the Bogsiders, but not to attempt to breach the barricades and enter the Bogside itself. This marked the first direct intervention of the London government in Northern Ireland since partition. The British troops were at first welcomed by most Bogside residents as a neutral force. No deaths resulted from the "battle", but it is estimated that more than 1000 people were injured, many of them seriously. The Battle of the Bogside is often regarded as the point at which the Troubles properly began.

== The early years of the Troubles ==
After the Battle of the Bogside, rioting and battles with police occurred in Derry on a semi-regular basis. In February 1971 a British Army soldier died after his vehicle was petrol bombed in the Bogside. In July that year, two rioters in the Bogside were shot dead by soldiers in disputed circumstances. In response, the Provisional Irish Republican Army, which had previously had little profile in Derry, began a campaign of violence in the city. By this stage the level of violence across Northern Ireland was such that the government introduced internment without trial in August 1971. Despite paramilitary violence coming from loyalists as well as republicans, internment was directed almost exclusively against republicans. Widespread rioting resulted, with 21 people being killed in three days of rioting across the country. By December 1971 seven soldiers and RUC had been killed in Derry, mostly by the Official or Provisional IRA. The army had also killed several civilians, including 14-year-old Annette McGavigan. Extensive barricades were erected in Catholic suburbs of Derry, organized mostly by the two IRAs. These were intended to prevent access to the army, police, and loyalist mobs, and many were impassable even to the British Army's one-ton armoured vehicles. Due to rioting and damage to shops caused by incendiary devices, an estimated total of £4 million worth of damage had been done to local businesses. Between its formation in 1969 to its ceasefire in 1972 the Official IRA held the most significant presence in Derry - mainly in the Bogside - compared to the Provisional IRA.

== Bloody Sunday ==
One of the Troubles' key events, "Bloody Sunday", occurred in Derry in 1972. On 30 January, 26 civil rights protesters were shot by members of the 1st Battalion of the British Parachute Regiment. Thirteen died immediately. Many witnesses including bystanders and journalists testify that all those shot were unarmed. Five of those wounded were shot in the back. During the march there was low-level rioting and two civilians were shot and wounded by soldiers. The army apparently believed that an IRA sniper was operating in the area, and an order to fire live rounds was given. One young man was shot and killed as he ran away from advancing troops. The soldier then fired directly into the fleeing crowd near Free Derry Corner, killing 12 more people. Fourteen others were wounded, twelve by shots from the soldiers and two knocked down by armoured personnel carriers. No soldiers were reported injured despite the Army's claims that they had been responding to the threat of gunmen and nail bombs.

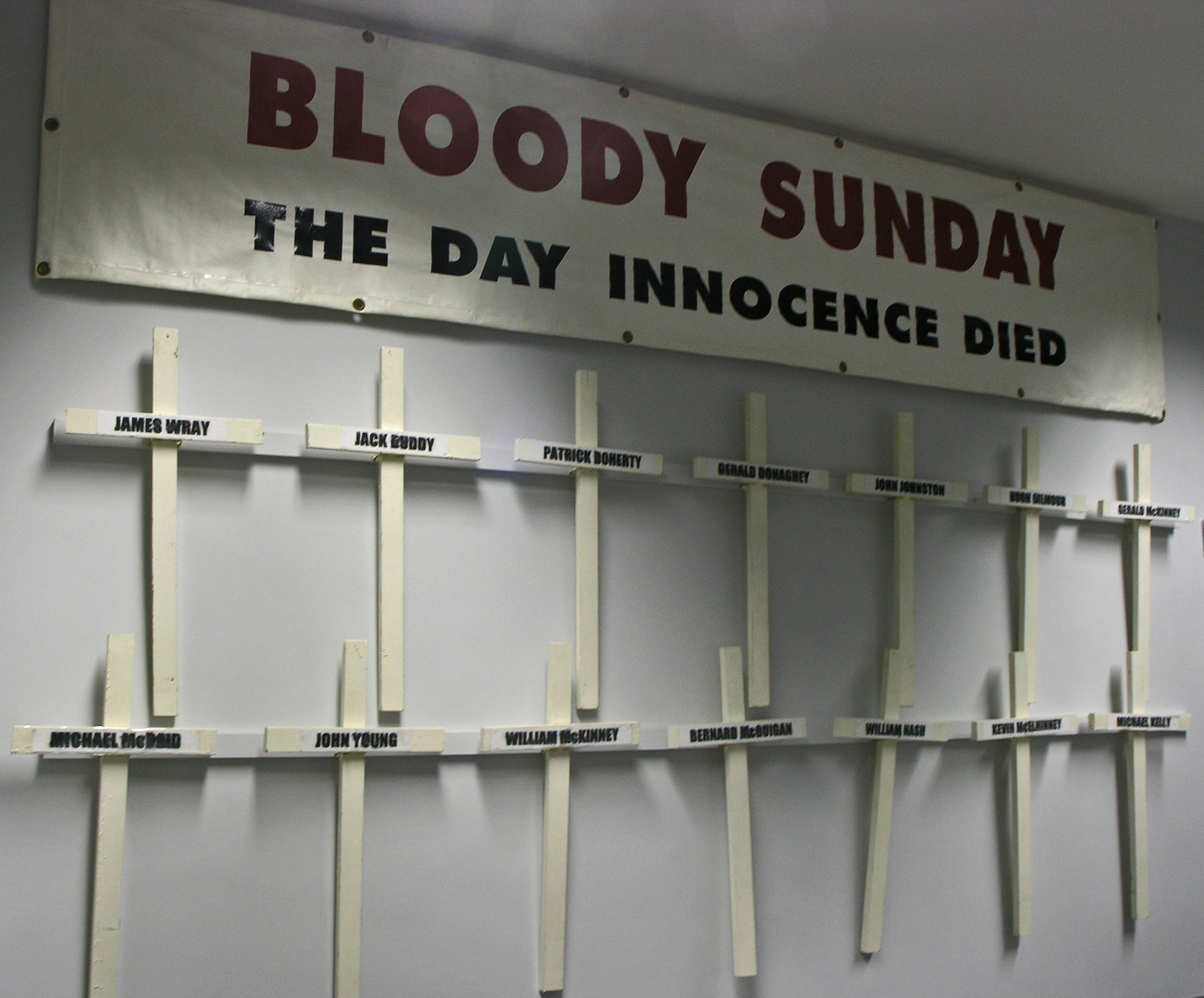
Memorial to the victims of Bloody Sunday in Derry

Numerous journalists were present and the events were widely reported, causing horror and fury around the world, but especially in both parts of Ireland. Irate crowds burned down the British embassy in Dublin. Anglo-Irish relations hit one of their lowest ebbs, with Irish Minister for Foreign Affairs, Patrick Hillery, going specially to the United Nations in New York to demand UN involvement in the Troubles. The British government commissioned a tribunal to investigate the events of the day; its report (the Widgery Report) supported the Army's account and was widely seen as a "whitewash". In August the following year, the city's coroner, retired British army Major Hubert O'Neill, issued a statement describing the events as "sheer unadulterated murder". On 29 May 2007 it was reported that General Sir Mike Jackson, second-in-command of 2 Para on Bloody Sunday, said: "I have no doubt that innocent people were shot". This was in sharp contrast to his insistence, for more than 30 years, that those killed on the day had not been innocent. A second inquiry into Bloody Sunday was established in 1998.

Bloody Sunday had a massive and negative impact on the Northern Irish conflict. Support for the IRA rose, and hatred for the Army became widespread amongst the Catholic community. The IRA and other republican paramilitaries used the events to justify a campaign against the British Army and other agents of the British state including the police and the Ulster Defence Regiment. The Provisionals gained a surge of new recruits from all across the city as well as County Donegal and County Londonderry. This allowed the relatively small battalion to form into its own brigade based in the city by the end of 1972. In late February the Official IRA bombed the Aldershot headquarters of the Parachute Regiment, but only succeeded in killing six support staff and a Catholic chaplain. In May, they also kidnapped and shot dead a Derry man who was home on leave from the British Army. The following day 500 women marched to the Republican Club offices in protest. Nine days later, on 29 May, the Official IRA declared a ceasefire, which it has kept to ever since. A month later the Provisional IRA also announced a ceasefire but this quickly broke down.

== Operation Motorman ==
In mid-1972 much of the Bogside was still off limits to the security forces, with barricades preventing their entry and the IRA controlling the area. The no-go areas had been in place since the introduction of internment in August 1971. The British and Northern Irish governments were unwilling to tolerate this, and at 4am on 31 July 1972 a massive British Army mobilisation began, called Operation Motorman. This involved almost 22,000 soldiers, 27 infantry and two armoured battalions aided by 5,300 UDR men. The number of troops was approximately four percent of the entire strength of the British Army. There were also several Centurion AVREs used, the only time that heavy armoured vehicles were deployed during the Troubles. During the operation two 15-year-old boys were shot and killed. One was a member of the IRA and bled to death while in the custody of British soldiers; the other was an uninvolved civilian. Neither branch of the IRA attempted to resist the operation as they were outnumbered and outgunned. After this there were no more no-go areas in Northern Irish cities although British patrols remained cautious when in the Bogside.

== After 1972 ==
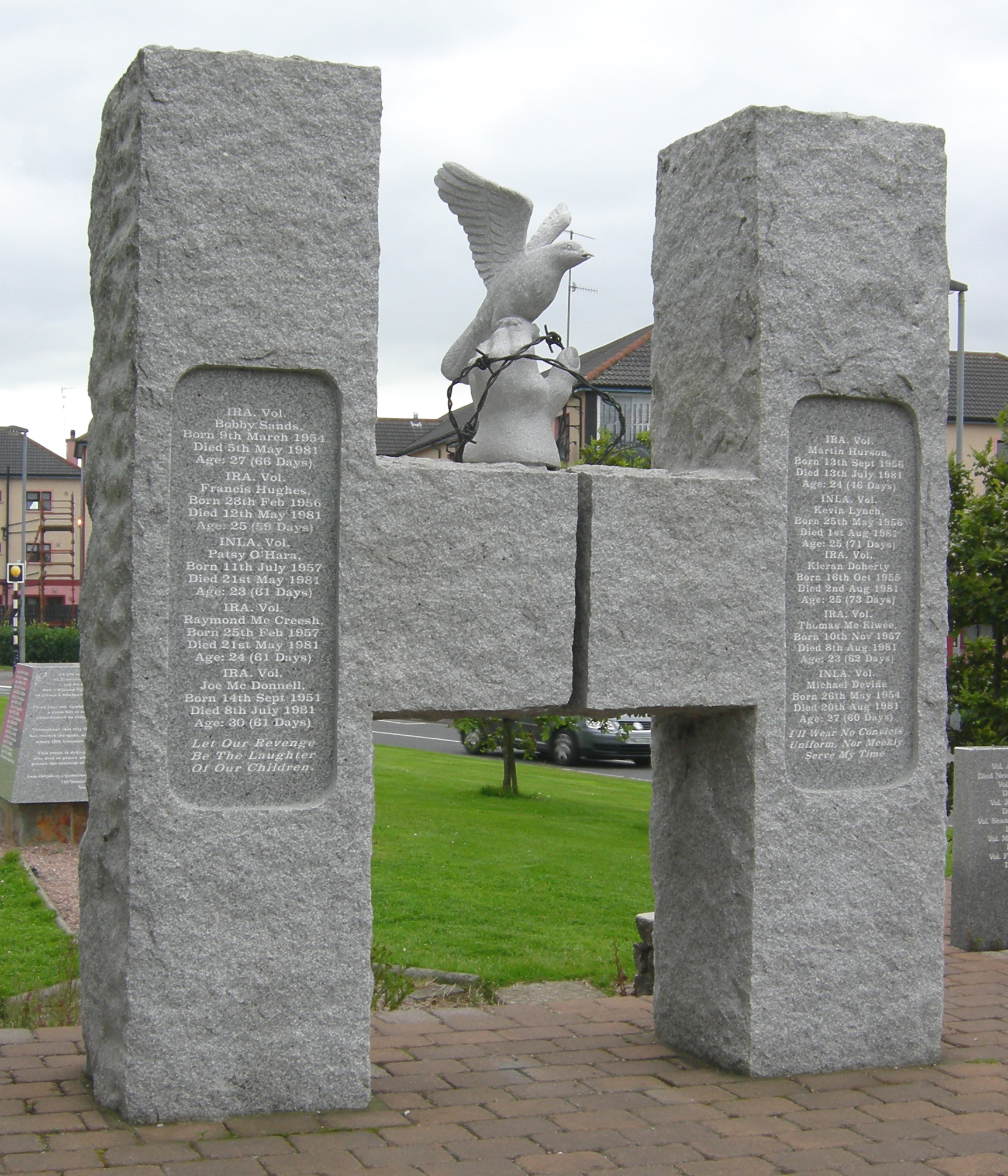
Memorial to the hunger strikers in Derry

After 1972, violence in Derry continued regularly much like major cities in Northern Ireland after Operation Motorman. Throughout the rest of the 1970s and 1980s, street riots happened often and hate for the British Army continued. The city was organized more by the two IRAs but after Motorman Catholic areas were commonly patrolled by the army. This resulted in more street riots and Republican and sectarian attacks. The main loyalist paramilitary that made the biggest presence in Derry was the Ulster Defense Association. Since its formation in 1971 to 1992, it remained legal and was able to expand quickly and legally across Northern Ireland with ease, unlike the illegal Ulster Volunteer Force. The Provisional IRA continued its campaign of violence in the city, and the Irish National Liberation Army, a group formed of disaffected members of the Official IRA formed in 1974 a few months after the officials called off their armed campaign, made a big presence in Derry. In fact, all the INLA hunger strikers who died on the 1981 Irish hunger strike were from Derry or County Londonderry. In the late 1980s and the early 90s, the Irish National Liberation Army and the Irish People's Liberation Organisation began a bloody feud in the city along with other areas in Ireland. This ended the IPLO presence and severely weakened the INLA presence in the city. Throughout the 1990s, tensions cooled and violence traveled mainly to Belfast, Armagh and East Tyrone even though street riots and sectarian violence was still common. Irish journalist Ed Moloney claims in "The Secret History of the IRA" that republican leaders there negotiated a de facto ceasefire in the city as early as 1991. Whether this is true or not, the city did see less bloodshed by this time than Belfast or other localities.
