= 1969 Northern Ireland riots =

Sectarian riots

- Part of the Troubles
- Police clash with rioters in Bogside district in Derry
- Date: 12–16 August 1969 (5 days)
- Location: Mainly Derry, Belfast, Newry, Armagh, Crossmaglen, Dungannon, Coalisland, Dungiven
- Methods: Demonstrations, rioting, house burnings, gun battles
- Result: 150+ homes destroyed; 1,820 families evacuated; British Army deployed; Peace lines built

Casualties and losses
- 8 killed 750+ injured (including 133 from gunshot wounds)

During 12–16 August 1969, there was an outbreak of political and sectarian violence throughout Northern Ireland, which is often seen as the beginning of the thirty-year conflict known as the Troubles. There had been sporadic violence throughout the year arising out of the Northern Ireland civil rights campaign, which demanded an end to discrimination against Catholics and Irish nationalists. Civil rights marches had been attacked by Protestant loyalists, and protesters often clashed with the Royal Ulster Constabulary (RUC), the overwhelmingly Protestant police force.

On 12 August, the Battle of the Bogside erupted in Derry: three days of fierce clashes between the RUC and thousands of Catholic/nationalist residents of Derry's Bogside district. The besieged residents built barricades and set up first aid posts and workshops for making petrol bombs. Police fired CS gas at rioters for the first time in the history of the UK. In support of the Bogsiders, on 13 August Catholics/nationalists held protests elsewhere in Northern Ireland, some of which led to violence. The bloodiest clashes were in Belfast, where seven people were killed and hundreds wounded, five of them Catholic civilians shot by police. Protesters clashed with both the police and with loyalists, who attacked Catholic districts. Scores of homes and businesses were burnt out, most of them owned by Catholics, and thousands of mostly Catholic families were driven from their homes. In some cases, police helped the loyalists and failed to protect Catholic areas. Both republican and loyalist paramilitaries were involved in the clashes. There were also clashes between protesters and police in Armagh, where a protester was killed by police, as well as in Dungannon and Newry.

The British Army was deployed to restore order on 14 August, beginning the thirty-seven year Operation Banner, and peace lines were built to separate Catholic and Protestant districts. The Republic of Ireland's government set up field hospitals and refugee centres near the Irish border, and called for a United Nations peacekeeping force to be sent to Northern Ireland. The British government held an inquiry into the riots, and the reserve police force was disbanded. The riots led to a split within the IRA and the formation of the Provisional Irish Republican Army and the Official Irish Republican Army. It also led to the growth of loyalist paramilitaries such as the Ulster Volunteer Force (UVF).

== Background ==
Northern Ireland was destabilised in 1968 by sporadic rioting arising out of the Northern Ireland Civil Rights Association (NICRA) campaign, and the police and loyalist reaction to it. The civil rights campaign demanded an end to discrimination against Catholics in voting rights, housing and employment. NICRA was opposed by loyalists led primarily by Ian Paisley.

During the summer of 1969, the International Commission of Jurists (ICJ) published a highly critical report which "criticised the Northern Ireland Government for police brutality, religious discrimination [against Catholics] and gerrymandering in politics". The ICJ secretary general said that laws and conditions in Northern Ireland had been cited by the South African government to justify its apartheid system. The Times reported that the Ulster Special Constabulary (B-Specials), Northern Ireland's reserve police force, was "regarded as the militant arm of the Protestant Orange Order". The Belfast Telegraph reported that the ICJ had added Northern Ireland to the list of states/jurisdictions "where the protection of human rights is inadequately assured".

=== Events leading up to the August riots ===
The first major confrontation between Catholic civil rights activists and the Royal Ulster Constabulary (RUC), Northern Ireland's overwhelmingly Protestant police force, occurred in Derry on 5 October 1968, when a NICRA march was baton-charged by the RUC. Disturbed by the prospect of major violence, the prime minister of Northern Ireland, Terence O'Neill, promised reforms in return for a "truce", whereby no further demonstrations would be held.

In spite of these promises, in January 1969 People's Democracy, a left-wing group, staged an anti-government march from Belfast to Derry. Loyalists, including off-duty members of the B-Specials, attacked the marchers, most determinedly at Burntollet Bridge, outside Derry. The RUC failed to adequately protect the marchers. This action, and the RUC's subsequent entry into Derry's predominantly Catholic Bogside district, led to serious rioting in the city.

In March and April 1969, there were six bomb attacks on electricity and water infrastructure, causing blackouts and water shortages. At first the attacks were blamed on the Irish Republican Army (IRA), but it later emerged that the loyalist Ulster Protestant Volunteers (UPV) and Ulster Volunteer Force (UVF) had carried out the bombings in an attempt to implicate the IRA, destabilise the Northern Ireland government and halt the reforms promised by O'Neill.

There was some movement on reform in the first half of 1969. On 23 April Ulster Unionist Party (UUP) members of the Northern Ireland parliament voted by 28 to 22 to introduce universal adult suffrage in local government elections in Northern Ireland. The call for "one man, one vote" had been one of the key demands of the civil rights movement. Five days later, O'Neill resigned as UUP leader and prime minister and was replaced in both roles by James Chichester-Clark. Chichester-Clark, despite having resigned in protest over the introduction of universal suffrage in local government, announced that he would continue the reforms begun by O'Neill.

Street violence, however, continued to escalate. On 19 April there was serious rioting in the Bogside following clashes between NICRA marchers and the RUC. A Catholic, Samuel Devenny, was severely beaten by the RUC and later died of his injuries. On 12 July, during the Orange Order's Twelfth of July marches, there was serious rioting in Derry, Belfast and Dungiven, causing many families in Belfast to flee from their homes. Another Catholic civilian, Francis McCloskey (67), died after being hit on the head with batons by RUC officers during rioting in Dungiven.

== Battle of the Bogside ==
This unrest culminated in a pitched battle in Derry from 12 to 14 August, known as the Battle of the Bogside. As the yearly march by the Protestant loyalist Apprentice Boys of Derry skirted the edge of the Catholic Bogside, stone-throwing broke out. The RUC—on foot and in armoured vehicles—drove back the Catholic crowd and attempted to force its way into the Bogside, followed by loyalists who smashed the windows of Catholic homes. Thousands of Bogside residents mobilised to defend the area, and beat back the RUC with a hail of stones and petrol bombs. Barricades were built, petrol bomb workshops and first aid posts were set up, and a radio transmitter ("Radio Free Derry") broadcast messages and called on "every able-bodied man in Ireland who believes in freedom" to defend the Bogside.

The overstretched police resorted to throwing stones back at the Bogsiders, and were helped by loyalists. They fired CS gas into the Bogside – the first time it had been used by police in the UK. The Bogsiders feared that the B-Specials, the wholly-Protestant police reserves, would be sent in and would massacre the Catholic residents. On 13 August, NICRA called for protests across Northern Ireland in support of the Bogside to draw police away from the fighting there. That night it issued a statement:

A war of genocide is about to flare across the North. The CRA demands that all Irishmen recognise their common interdependence and calls upon the Government and people of the Twenty-six Counties to act now to prevent a great national disaster. We urgently request that the Government take immediate action to have a United Nations peace-keeping force sent to Derry.

== Violence in Belfast ==
Belfast has a long history of riots between Catholics and Protestants. British rule in Ireland was cemented by official British support for Protestant settlement since the 17th Century. Beginning in 1835 there have been at least 15 major riots in Belfast, the most violent ones taking place in 1864, 1886 and 1921. See 1886 Belfast riots, Bloody Sunday (1921) and The Troubles in Ulster (1920–1922). Belfast saw the most intense violence of the August 1969 riots. Unlike Derry, Catholics were a minority in Belfast and mostly lived in enclaves surrounded by Protestant districts. For this reason, whereas in Derry the fighting was largely between nationalists and the RUC, in Belfast it also involved fighting between Catholics and Protestants, including exchanges of gunfire and widespread burning of homes and businesses.

On the night of 12 August, bands of Apprentice Boys arrived back in Belfast after taking part in the Derry march. They were met by Protestant pipe bands and a large crowd of supporters. They then marched to Shankill Road waving Union Flags and singing "The Sash My Father Wore", a popular loyalist ballad.

According to journalists Patrick Bishop and Eamonn Mallie, "Both communities were in the grip of a mounting paranoia about the other's intentions. Catholics were convinced that they were about to become victims of a Protestant pogrom; Protestants that they were on the eve of an IRA insurrection".

=== Wednesday 13 August ===
The first disturbances in Belfast took place on the night of 13 August. Derry activists Eamonn McCann and Seán Keenan contacted Frank Gogarty of NICRA to organise demonstrations in Belfast to draw off police from Derry. Independently, Belfast IRA leader Billy McMillen ordered republicans to organise demonstrations "in support of Derry".

In protest at the RUC's actions in Derry, a group of 500 nationalists held a demonstration outside Springfield Road police station, where they handed in a petition. After handing in the petition, the crowd of now 1,000–2,000 people, including IRA members such as Joe McCann, began a protest march along Falls Road and Divis Street to the Hastings Street police station. When they arrived, about fifty youths broke away from the march and attacked the police station with stones and petrol bombs. The RUC responded by deploying riot police and by driving Shorland armoured cars at the crowd. Protesters pushed burning cars onto the road to stop the RUC from entering the nationalist area.

At Leeson Street, roughly halfway between the two police stations, an RUC Humber armoured car was attacked with a hand grenade and rifle fire. At the time, it was not known who had launched the attack, but it has since emerged that it was IRA members, acting under the orders of Belfast commander Billy McMillen. He also authorised members of the Fianna Éireann (IRA youth wing) to attack the Springfield Road police station with petrol bombs. The station also came under fire, and police fired "warning shots" in response, wounding two young men.

In addition to the attacks on the RUC, the car dealership of Protestant Isaac Agnew, on the Falls Road, was destroyed. The nationalist crowd also burnt a Catholic-owned pub and betting shop. At this stage, loyalist crowds gathered on Shankill Road but did not join in the clashes.

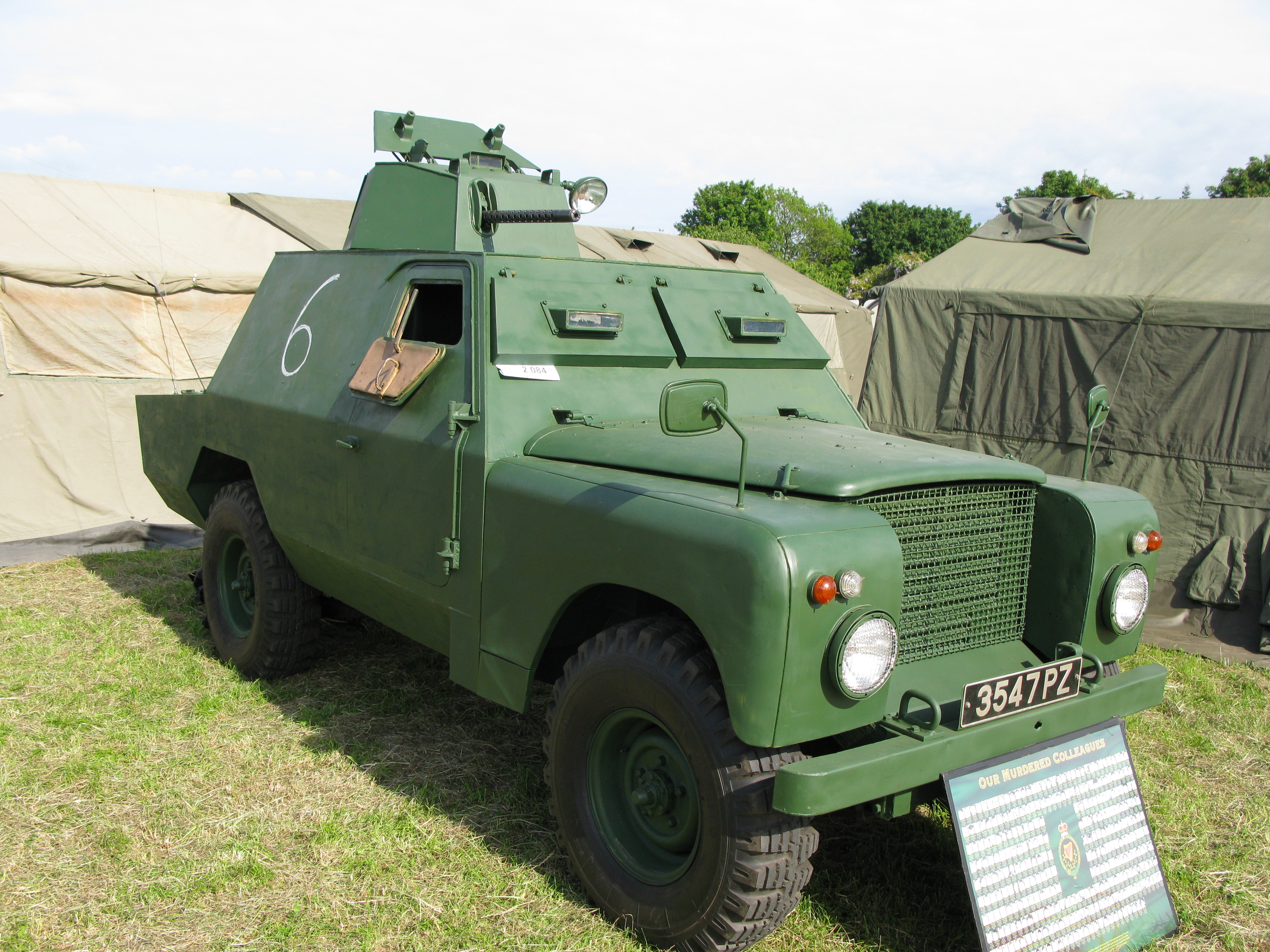
A Shorland armoured car. The RUC used Shorlands mounted with Browning machine guns during the riots.

=== Thursday 14 August and early Friday 15 August ===
On 14 August, many Catholics and Protestants living near sectarian flashpoints fled their homes for safety.

Loyalists viewed the nationalist attacks of Wednesday night as an organised attempt by the IRA "to undermine the constitutional position of Northern Ireland within the United Kingdom". McMillen called up all available IRA members for "defensive duties" and sent parties out to Cupar Street, Divis Street and St Comgall's School on Dover Street. They amounted to thirty IRA volunteers, twelve women, forty youths from the Fianna and 15–20 girls. Their arms consisted of one Thompson submachine gun, one Sten submachine gun, one Lee–Enfield rifle and six handguns. A "wee factory" was also set up in Leeson Street to make petrol bombs. Their orders at the outset were to "disperse people trying to burn houses, but under no circumstances to take life".

==== Falls–Shankill interface at Divis Street ====
At around 7 pm, a nationalist crowd the Falls gathered outside Hastings Street police station and began to attack it with stones and petrol bombs for a second night. Riot police and armoured vehicles scattered the nationalists and moved into the Falls district. From the rooftop of the Whitehall flats, part of the Divis complex, a group of nationalists would spend the rest of the night raining missiles on the police below. A chain of people were passing stones and petrol bombs from the ground to the roof.

Loyalist crowds armed with petrol bombs, bricks, stones, sharpened poles and protective dustbin lids gathered at Dover and Percy Streets. On Dover Street, the loyalist crowd was led by Ulster Unionist MP John McQuade. They included a rowdy gang of loyalist football supporters who had returned from a match. The loyalists began moving down these streets into the Catholic district, attacking Catholic homes and businesses. They were confronted by nationalists, who had hastily blocked their streets with barricades. Fighting broke out between the rival factions at about 11 pm. Catholics claimed that B-Specials had been seen giving guns to the loyalists, while journalists reported seeing pike-wielding loyalists standing among RUC officers. On Percy Street, a loyalist opened fire with a shotgun, and B-Specials helped the loyalists to push back the nationalists.

At about 12:30 am, an IRA unit opened fire on RUC officers and loyalists gathered at the intersection of Dover and Divis Street, at the edge of the Catholic district. Protestant Herbert Roy (26) was killed and three officers were wounded. Police responded with bursts from Sterling submachine guns. At this point, the RUC, believing they were facing an organised IRA uprising, deployed Shorland armoured cars mounted with Browning machine guns, whose .30 calibre bullets "tore through walls as if they were cardboard".

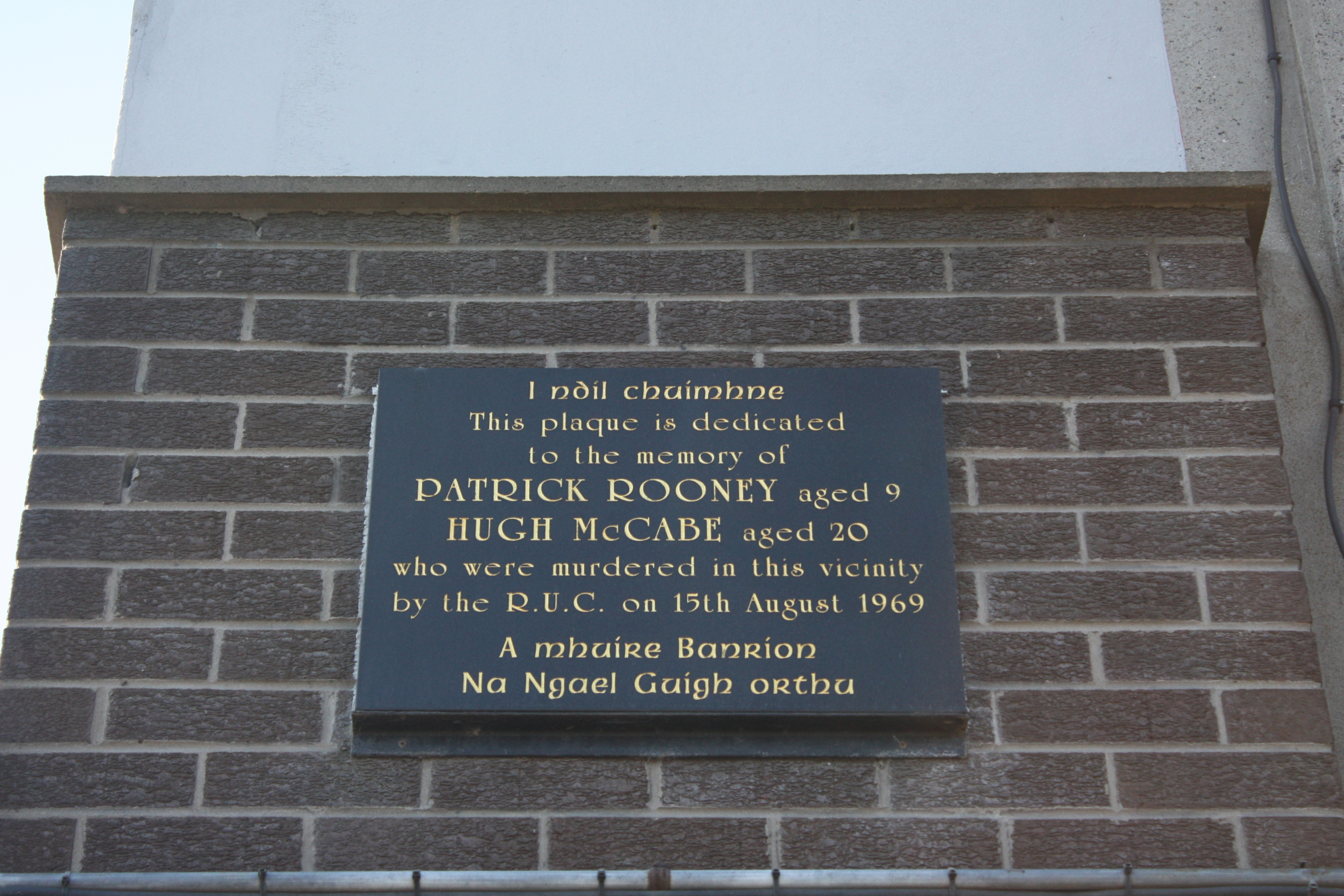
Memorial plaque for Patrick Rooney and Hugh McCabe at Divis Tower

In response to the RUC coming under fire at Divis Street, three Shorland armoured cars were called to the scene. The Shorlands were immediately attacked with gunfire, an explosive device and petrol bombs. The RUC believed that the shots had come from the Divis complex. Gunners inside the Shorlands opened fire with their heavy machine-guns. At least thirteen Divis flats were hit by high-velocity gunfire. A nine-year-old boy, Patrick Rooney, was killed by police machine-gun fire as he lay in bed in one of the flats. He was the first child to be killed in the violence.

The Republican Labour Party MP for Belfast Central, Paddy Kennedy, who was on the scene, phoned RUC headquarters and appealed to Northern Ireland Minister for Home Affairs, Robert Porter, for the Shorlands to be withdrawn and the shooting to stop. Porter replied that this was impossible as "the whole town is in rebellion". Porter told Kennedy that Donegall Street police station was under heavy machine-gun fire. In fact, it was undisturbed throughout the riots.

At about 1 am, police marksmen on the roof of Hastings Street station fired eighteen rifle rounds at rioters on the roof of the Whitehall flats. The shots killed Hugh McCabe (20), a Catholic soldier in the British Army who was on leave, and wounded several other people. The police marksmen claimed they responded to gunfire coming from the roof of the Whitehall flats, although witnesses denied that anyone on the roof was armed.

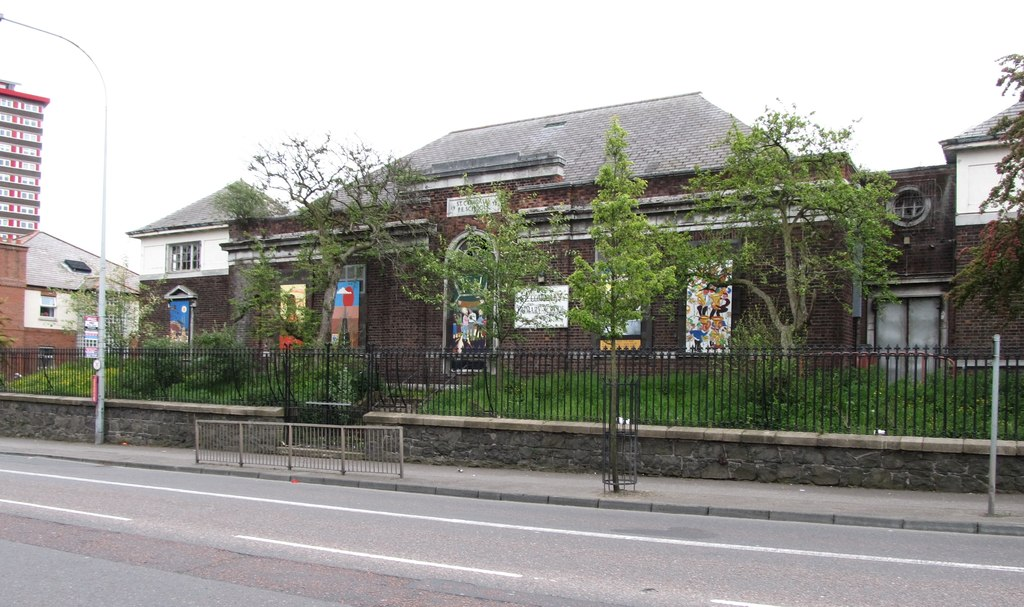
St Comgall's School on Divis Street

Some time after the killing of Hugh McCabe, some 200 loyalists attacked Divis Street and began burning Catholic houses there. A unit of six IRA volunteers in St Comgall's School shot at them with a rifle, a Thompson submachine gun and pistols; keeping the attackers back and wounding eight. An RUC Shorland then arrived and opened fire on the school. The IRA gunmen returned fire and managed to escape.

==== Falls–Shankill interface at Clonard ====
West of St Comgall's, loyalists from the Shankill broke through the nationalist barricades on Conway Street and burned two-thirds of the houses. Catholics claimed that the RUC held them back as the loyalists burned their homes. The Scarman Report found that RUC officers were on Conway Street when its houses were set on fire, but "failed to take effective action". Journalist Max Hastings wrote that loyalists on Conway Street had been begging the RUC to give them their guns.

==== Ardoyne ====
The Crumlin Road in north Belfast marked the boundary between the Protestant/loyalist Woodvale district to the south, and the Catholic/nationalist Ardoyne district to the north. According to the Scarman Tribunal, at around 10:30pm a "pitched battle" erupted on the Crumlin Road between members of the two communities. The RUC made baton charges into the Catholic streets, using a Humber armoured vehicle to smash through barricades that had been erected. The Scarman Tribunal recorded that they were followed by a crowd of loyalists, who reportedly threw petrol bombs at Catholics "over the heads of RUC officers". The RUC were pelted with stones and petrol bombs from nationalists, and there were reports of nationalist gunfire coming from Herbert Street. Police responded by firing a Sterling submachine gun at several houses on the street, killing Catholic civilian Samuel McLarnon (aged 27). A Police Ombudsman report later concluded that this "was disproportionate and posed a risk to civilian life".

On Butler Street, a Humber vehicle was struck by petrol bombs, caught fire and stalled. As the RUC officers jumped out, they allegedly came under fire from the nationalist crowd. A Head Constable told his officers to fire a warning volley over the heads of the crowd, which they did with Sterling submachine guns and revolvers. When the shooting at police continued, he ordered his officers to "fire for effect" (i.e. to wound or kill). Catholic civilian Michael Lynch (aged 28) was killed. Ten other people were wounded by gunfire in the area that night, all of them Catholics.

=== Friday 15 August ===
The morning of 15 August saw many Catholic families in central Belfast flee to Andersonstown, on the western fringes of the city, to escape the rioting. According to Bishop and Mallie, "Each side's perceptions of the other's intentions had become so warped that the Protestants believed the Catholics were clearing the decks for a further attempt at insurrection in the evening".

At 4:30am on Friday 15 August, the police commissioner for Belfast asked for military aid. From the early hours of Friday, the RUC had withdrawn to its bases to defend them. The interface areas were thus left unpoliced for half a day until the British Army arrived. The deputy police commissioner had assumed that the Army would be deployed by 10am or 11am. At 12:25 that afternoon, the Northern Ireland cabinet finally sent a request for military aid to the Home Office in London. However, it would be another nine hours until the Army arrived at the Falls-Shankill interface where it was needed. Many Catholics felt they had been left at the mercy of loyalists by the forces of the state who were meant to protect them.

The IRA in Belfast, which had limited manpower and weaponry at the start of the riots, was also exhausted and low on ammunition. McMillen and nineteen other republicans were arrested by the RUC early on 15 August under the Special Powers Act.

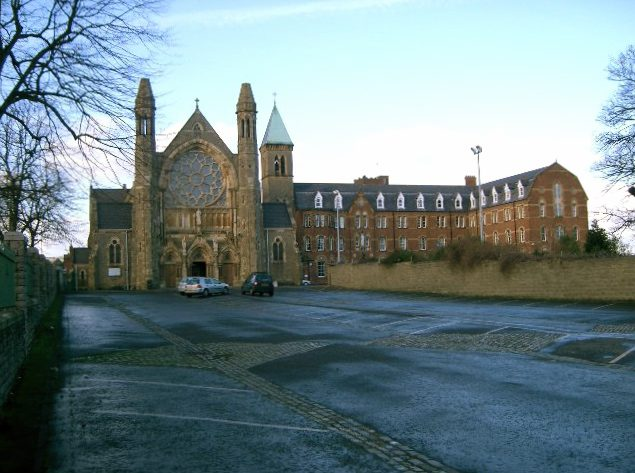
There was fierce rioting in streets around Clonard Monastery (pictured), where hundreds of Catholic homes were burned

==== Falls–Shankill interface at Clonard ====
On 15 August, violence continued along the Falls-Shankill interface. Father PJ Egan of Clonard Monastery recalled that a large loyalist mob moved down Cupar Street at about 3pm and was confronted by nationalist youths. Shooting began at about 3:45pm. Egan claimed that himself and other priests at Clonard Monastery made at least four calls to the RUC for help, but none came.

A small IRA party under Billy McKee was present and had two .22 caliber rifles at their disposal. They exchanged fire with a loyalist sniper who was shooting from a house on Cupar Street, but failed to dislodge him, or to halt the burning of Catholic houses in the area. Almost all of the houses on Bombay Street were burned by the loyalists, and many others were burned on Kashmir Road and Cupar Street – the most extensive destruction of property during the riots. A loyalist sniper shot dead Gerald McAuley (15), a member of the Fianna, as he helped people flee their homes on Bombay Street.

At about 6:30pm The Royal Regiment of Wales was deployed on the Falls Road, where they were greeted with subdued applause and cheering. However, despite pleas from local Catholics, they did not move into the streets that were being attacked. At about 9:35pm that night, the soldiers finally took up positions at the blazing interface and blocked the streets with barbed-wire barricades. Fr Egan recalled that the soldiers called on the loyalists to surrender but the loyalists instead began shooting and throwing petrol bombs. The soldiers could only fire back on the orders of an officer when life was directly threatened. The loyalists continued shooting and burned more Catholic-owned houses on Bombay Street, but were stopped by soldiers using tear gas.

==== Ardoyne ====
Soldiers were not deployed in Ardoyne, and violence continued there on Friday night. Nationalists hijacked fifty buses from the local bus depot, set them on fire and used them as makeshift barricades to block access to Ardoyne. A Protestant civilian, David Linton (48), was shot dead by IRA gunmen at the Palmer Street/Crumlin Road junction. Several Catholic-owned houses were burned on Brookfield Street. The Scarman Report found that an RUC armoured vehicle was nearby when Brookfield Street was set on fire, but did not intervene.

On the evening of 16 August the British Army was deployed on Crumlin Road. Thereafter, the violence died down into what the Scarman report called "the quiet of exhaustion". Around this date long time IRA leader Joe Cahill was able to travel (with others) to the south of Ireland and obtain weapons from another IRA leader - John Joe McGirl.

== Disturbances elsewhere ==
Towns and cities where major riots took place

In aid of the Bogsiders, the NICRA executive called for protests in towns across Northern Ireland. The Scarman Report concluded that the spread of the disturbances "owed much to a deliberate decision by some minority groups to relieve police pressure on the rioters in Londonderry". It included NICRA among these groups.

On the evening of 11 August a riot erupted in Dungannon after a NICRA demonstration. This was quelled after the RUC baton charged nationalist rioters down Irish Street. There were claims of police brutality. The following night republicans attacked the police stations in Coalisland, Strabane and Newry. There were further riots on 13 August in Dungannon, Coalisland, Dungiven, Newry and Armagh. In Coalisland, the B-Specials opened fire on rioters without orders but were immediately ordered to stop.

On 14 August riots continued in Dungannon, Armagh and Newry. In Dungannon and Armagh, the B-Specials again opened fire on rioters. They fired twenty-four rounds on Cathedral Road in Armagh, killing Catholic civilian John Gallagher and wounding two others. In Newry, nationalist rioters surrounded the police station and attacked it with petrol bombs. In Crossmaglen on 17 August, the IRA attacked the police station and withdrew after an exchange of fire.

== Reactions ==
On 13 August, Taoiseach (Irish Prime Minister) Jack Lynch made a television address in which he stated that the Irish Defence Forces were setting up field hospitals along the Irish border and called for UN intervention. He said:

It is evident that the Stormont Government is no longer in control of the situation. Indeed, the present situation is the inevitable outcome of the policies pursued for decades by successive Stormont Governments. It is clear, also, that the Irish Government can no longer stand by and see innocent people injured and perhaps worse. It is obvious that the R.U.C. is no longer accepted as an impartial police force. Neither would the employment of British troops be acceptable [...] The Irish Government have, therefore, requested the British Government to apply immediately to the United Nations for the urgent despatch of a Peace-keeping Force [...] We have also asked the British Government to see to it that police attacks on the people of Derry should cease immediately.

When the Irish government met on 14 and 15 August, it decided to send troops to protect the field hospitals and to call up the first line army reserves "in readiness for participation in peace-keeping operations". This, along with Lynch's statement, fuelled rumours that Irish troops were about to cross the border and intervene. On 16 August, three Irish nationalist members of the Northern Ireland parliament—Paddy Kennedy, Paddy Devlin and Paddy O'Hanlon—went to the Irish Department of Foreign Affairs in Dublin and demanded the Irish government send guns to protect Catholics in Northern Ireland, but were refused.

The prime minister of Northern Ireland, James Chichester-Clark, responded: "In this grave situation, the behaviour of the Dublin Government has been deplorable, and tailor-made to inflame opinion on both sides". On 14 August he stated in the Northern Ireland parliament:

This is not the agitation of a minority seeking by lawful means the assertion of political rights. It is the conspiracy of forces seeking to overthrow a Government democratically elected by a large majority. What the teenage hooligans seek beyond cheap kicks I do not know. But of this I am quite certain – they are being manipulated and encouraged by those who seek to discredit and overthrow this Government".

Chichester-Clark denied that his government was not doing enough to bring about the reforms sought by the civil rights movement, or that this was a cause of the violence. Instead, he said, "The real cause of the disorder is to be found in the activities of extreme Republican elements and others determined to overthrow our State".

On 23 August, Catholic Cardinal William Conway, together with the Catholic bishops of Derry, Clogher, Dromore, Kilmore, and Down & Connor, issued a statement which included the following:

The fact is that on Thursday and Friday of last week the Catholic districts of Falls and Ardoyne were invaded by mobs equipped with machine-guns and other firearms. A community which was virtually defenceless was swept by gunfire and streets of Catholic homes were systematically set on fire. We entirely reject the hypothesis that the origin of last week's tragedy was an armed insurrection.

The Irish republican party, Sinn Féin, issued a statement saying, "The present events in the Six Counties are the outcome of fifty years of British rule. The civil rights demands, moderate though they are, have shown us that Unionist rule is incompatible with democracy [...] The question now is no longer civil rights, but the continuation of British rule in Ireland".

Representatives of the British and Northern Ireland governments—including Chichester-Clark and British Prime Minister Harold Wilson—held a two-day meeting at 10 Downing Street, beginning on 19 August. A Communique and Declaration was issued at the end of the first day. It re-affirmed that Northern Ireland would remain part of the United Kingdom unless the people of Northern Ireland decided otherwise, and that the Northern Ireland and British governments are solely responsible for affairs in Northern Ireland. The Irish government failed to have a resolution on Northern Ireland put to a vote at the UN.

In late August, the Northern Ireland government announced the establishment of an inquiry into the riots, to be chaired by Justice Scarman (and known as the "Scarman Inquiry"). A committee under Baron Hunt was also set up to consider reform of the RUC and the B-Specials, which led to the latter being disbanded.

== Casualties and refugees ==
The rioting petered out by Sunday, 17 August. By the end of the riots:

- Eight people had been killed, including:
  - Five Catholics shot dead by the RUC
  - Two Protestants shot dead by nationalist gunmen
  - One Fianna member shot dead by loyalist gunmen
- 750+ people had been injured – 133 (72 Catholics and 61 Protestants) of those injured suffered gunshot wounds
- 150+ Catholic homes and 275+ businesses had been destroyed – 83% of all buildings destroyed were owned by Catholics

During July, August and September 1969, 1,820+ families had been forced to flee their homes, including

- 1,505 Catholic families
- 315 Protestant families

Catholics generally fled across the border into the Republic of Ireland, while Protestants generally fled to east Belfast. The Irish Defence Forces set up refugee camps in the Republic – at one point the Gormanston refugee camp held 6,000 refugees from Northern Ireland.

== Long-term effects ==
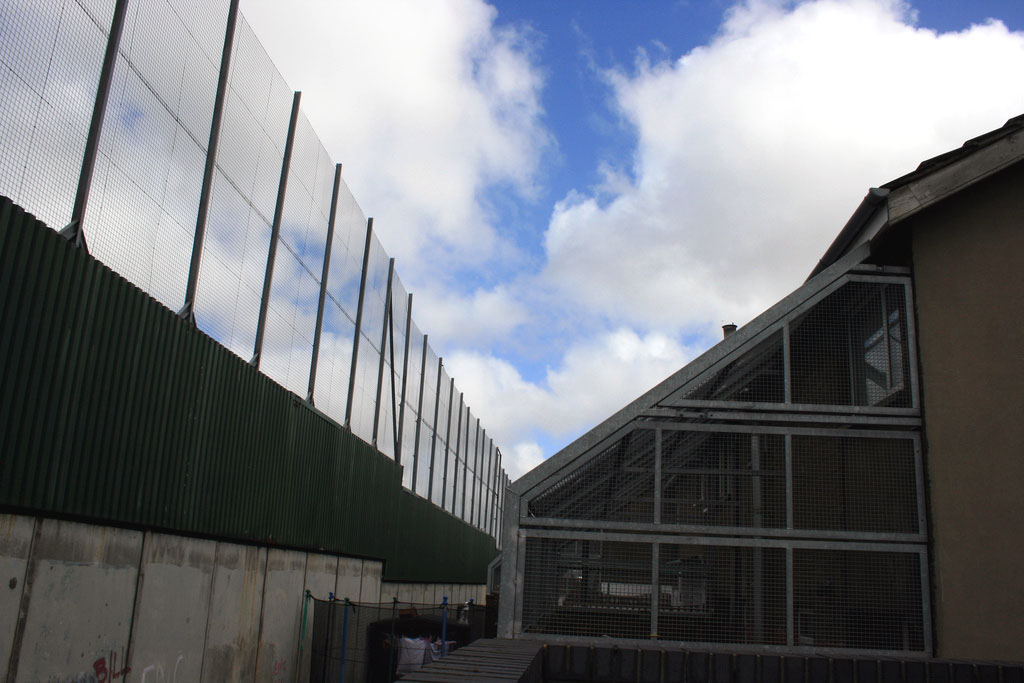
The modern "peace line" at Bombay Street in Belfast, seen from the Irish Catholic/nationalist side. This is the view from the back of a house.

The August riots were the most sustained violence that Northern Ireland had seen since the early 1920s. Many Protestants, loyalists and unionists believed the violence showed the true face of the Catholic civil rights movement – as a front for the IRA and armed insurrection. They had mixed feelings regarding the deployment of British troops. Eddie Kinner, a resident of Dover Street who would later join the UVF, vividly recalled the troops marching down his street with fixed bayonets and steel helmets; he and his neighbours had felt they were being invaded by their "own army".

Catholics and nationalists, on the other hand, saw the riots (particularly in Belfast) as an assault on their community by loyalists and the forces of the state. The riots are often cited as the beginning of the Troubles. Violence escalated sharply in Northern Ireland after these events, with the formation of new paramilitary groups on both sides, most notably the Provisional Irish Republican Army (IRA) in December of that year. On the loyalist side, the UVF were galvanised by the riots and in 1971, another paramilitary group, the Ulster Defence Association (UDA) was founded out of a coalition of loyalist militants who had been active since August 1969. The largest of these were the Woodvale Defence Association, led by Charles Harding Smith, and the Shankill Defence Association, led by John McKeague, which had been responsible for what organisation there was of loyalist violence in the riots. While the thousands of British troops sent to Northern Ireland were initially seen as a neutral force, they quickly got dragged into the street violence and by 1971 were devoting most of their attention to combating republican paramilitaries.

=== Irish Republican Army ===
The role of the IRA in the riots has long been disputed. At the time, the organisation was blamed by the Northern Ireland authorities for the violence. However, it was badly prepared to defend nationalist areas of Belfast, having few weapons or members on the ground. The Scarman Inquiry concluded:

Undoubtedly there was an IRA influence at work in the DCDA (Derry Citizens' Defence Association) in Londonderry, in the Ardoyne and Falls Road areas of Belfast, and in Newry. But they did not start the riots, or plan them: indeed, the evidence is that the IRA was taken by surprise and did less than many of their supporters thought they should have done.

In Catholic areas, the IRA was reportedly blamed for having failed to protect neighbourhoods like Bombay Street and Ardoyne from being burned out. A Catholic priest, Fr Gillespie, reported that in Ardoyne the IRA was being derided in graffiti as, "I Ran Away". However, IRA veterans of the time, who spoke to authors Brian Hanley and Scott Millar, disputed this. One, Sean O'Hare, said, "I never saw it written on a wall. That wasn't the attitude. People fell in behind the IRA, stood behind them 100%". Another, Sean Curry, recalled "some people were a bit angry but most praised the people who did defend the area. They knew that if the men weren't there, the area wouldn't have been defended."

At the time, the IRA released a statement on 18 August, saying it had been "in action in Belfast and Derry" and "fully equipped units had been sent to the border". It had been "reluctantly compelled into action by Orange murder gangs" and warned the British Army that if it "was used to supress [sic] the legitimate demands of the people they will have to take the consequences" and urged the Irish government to send the Irish Army over the border. Cathal Goulding, the IRA Chief of Staff, sent small units from Dublin and counties Cork and Kerry to the border counties of Donegal, Leitrim and Monaghan with orders to attack RUC posts in Northern Ireland and draw off pressure from Belfast and Derry. A total of 96 weapons and 12,000 rounds of ammunition were also sent to the North.

Nevertheless, the poor state of IRA arms and military capability in August 1969 led to a bitter split within the IRA in Belfast. According to Hanley and Millar, "dissensions that pre-dated August [1969] had been given a powerful emotional focus". In September 1969, a group of IRA men led by Billy McKee and Joe Cahill stated that they would no longer be taking orders from the Dublin leadership of the IRA, or from Billy McMillen (their commander in Belfast), because they had not provided enough weapons or planning to defend Catholic areas. In December 1969, they broke away to form the 'Provisional' IRA and vowed to defend areas from attack by loyalists and the RUC. The other wing of the IRA became known as the 'Official' IRA. Shortly after its formation, Provisionals launched an offensive campaign against the state of Northern Ireland.

=== The RUC and USC ===
The actions of the police in the riots are perhaps the most contentious issue arising out of the disturbances. Nationalists argue that the RUC acted in a blatantly biased manner, helping loyalists who were assaulting Catholic neighbourhoods. There were also strong suggestions that police knew when loyalist attacks were to happen and seemed to disappear from some Catholic areas shortly before loyalist mobs attacked. This perception discredited the police in the eyes of many Catholics/nationalists and later allowed the IRA to effectively take over policing in Catholic areas. In his study From Civil Rights to Armalites, nationalist author Niall Ó Dochartaigh argues that the actions of the RUC and USC (B-Specials) were a key factor in the worsening of the conflict. He wrote:

From the outset, the response of the state and its forces of law and order to Catholic mobilisation was an issue capable of arousing far more anger and activism than the issues around which mobilisation had begun. Police behaviour and their interaction with loyalist protesters probably did more to politically mobilise large sections of the Catholic community than did any of the other grievances.

The Scarman Inquiry found that the RUC were "seriously at fault" on at least six occasions during the rioting. Specifically, they criticised the RUC's use of Browning heavy machine-guns in built-up areas, their failure to stop Protestants from burning down Catholic homes, and their withdrawal from the streets long before the Army arrived. However, the Scarman Report concluded that, "Undoubtedly mistakes were made and certain individual officers acted wrongly on occasions. But the general case of a partisan force co-operating with Protestant crowds to attack Catholic people is devoid of substance, and we reject it utterly". The report argued that the RUC were under-strength, poorly led and that their conduct in the riots was explained by their belief they were dealing with a co-ordinated IRA uprising. They pointed to the RUC's dispersal of loyalist rioters in Belfast on 2–4 August in support of the force's impartiality.

Of the B-Specials, the Scarman Report said:

There were grave objections, well understood by those in authority, to the use of the USC in communal disturbances. In 1969 the USC contained no Catholics but was a force drawn from the Protestant section of the community. Totally distrusted by the Catholics, who saw them as the strong arm of the Protestant ascendancy, they could not show themselves in a Catholic area without heightening tension. Moreover, they were neither trained nor equipped for riot control duty.

The report found that the B-Specials had fired on Catholic demonstrators in Dungiven, Coalisland, Dungannon and Armagh, causing casualties, which "was a reckless and irresponsible thing to do". It found that B-Specials had, on occasion, sided with loyalist mobs. There were reports that B-Specials were spotted hiding among loyalist mobs, using coats to hide their uniforms. Nevertheless, the Scarman Report concluded "there are no grounds for singling out mobilised USC as being guilty of misconduct".

== See also ==
- 1886 Belfast riots
- Exercise Armageddon
- "The Night We Burned Ardoyne"
- Bloody Sunday
- Drumcree conflict
- 1992 Coalisland riots
- 1997 nationalist riots in Northern Ireland
- Protests of 1968
