= Annette McGavigan =

Northern Irish student, killed during the Troubles

Shooting of Annette McGavigan
- Part of the Troubles
- Annette McGavigan, c. 1971
- Location: 54°59′47″N 7°19′48″W; Derry, Northern Ireland
- Date: 6 September 1971; 18:00
- Weapon: L1A1 SLR rifle

Annette McGavigan (1 June 1957 – 6 September 1971) was a 14-year-old girl killed by a British soldier by gunshot on 6 September 1971. McGavigan's family has claimed that the bullet which killed her was fired by a British soldier.

After three years of conflict in Northern Ireland, Annette became the 100th civilian to be killed in the Troubles. No individual has been charged with her death.

== Early life ==
Annette lived with her parents, four brothers and two sisters, in Drumcliffe Avenue in the Bogside. She was a pupil at St. Cecilia's College in Derry. Her siblings recall her as an artistic, bubbly and good natured teen. Her younger sister, May, believes Annette would have become a nurse.

On 6 September, all pupils at Annette's school had been allowed to leave early due to ongoing rioting in and around the Little Diamond area of the Bogside. Annette and several of her friends had gathered to collect the rubber bullets that inevitably littered the ground in such melees.

== Death ==
After the rioting had begun to wane at approximately 18:00, Annette, still wearing her school uniform and holding an ice-cream in her hand, was shot in the back of the head while standing at the corner of Blucher Street and Westland Street. Reportedly, McGavigan was shot as she attempted to pick up a rubber bullet to add to her collection of riot souvenirs. Her younger sister, May—who had been sent by her mother to purchase fruit from a local shop—was approached by a friend who informed her "a wee girl's been shot", without informing her that her own sister was the casualty. May relayed this news to her mother, who exclaimed: "God help that poor girl and her mother and father, whoever they are."

Father Edward Daly, who gave McGavigan the last rites, later recollected: "I saw a young girl lying on the ground with an ice-cream beside her. She had been hit in the head and was on the point of death. I gave her the last rites and then had to break the news to her mother, who collapsed. It was very difficult. It made a very powerful impression on me." At the time of Annette's death, British soldiers were positioned in the grounds of the old post office between the Little Diamond and Frederick Street; confronting a number of rioting youths in the Little Diamond, Fahan Street and Eglinton Place area.

Despite continued efforts by Annette's family to pursue inquests relating to the circumstances and culpability of her death, no individual has ever been charged or brought to trial in relation to Annette's death. The Ministry of Defence has refused to release intelligence documentation relating to her death. Nonetheless, her family have vowed they will continue to fight for justice.

== Legacy ==
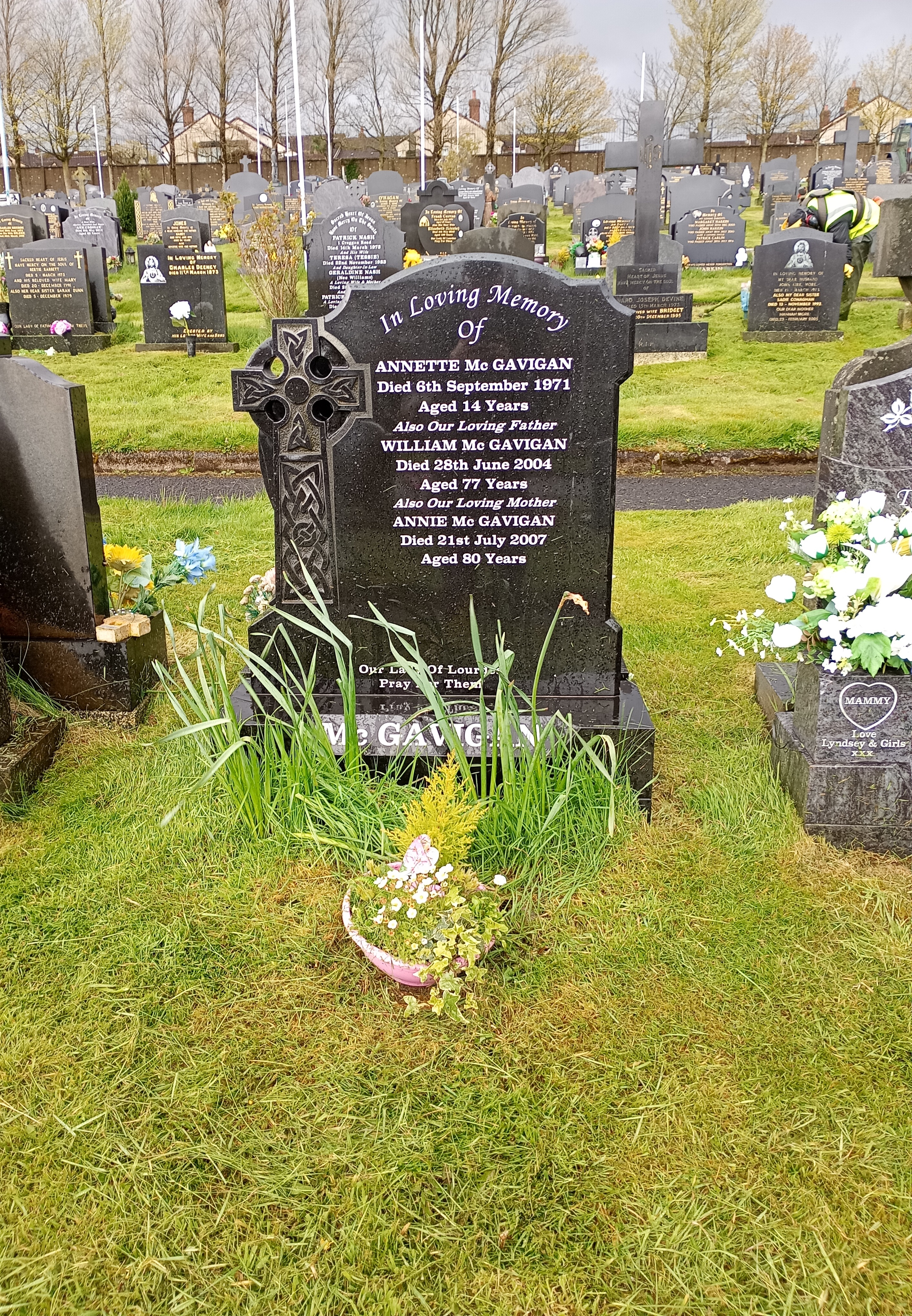
McGavigan's grave in Derry City Cemetery

Annette is the subject of a Bogside mural entitled "The Death of Innocence." This mural is located on the gable wall of a maisonnette on the junction of Lecky Road and Westland Street, close to Free Derry Corner. The mural was originally unveiled on Wednesday 1 September 1999, and depicts Annette in her school uniform with an encircled, blue butterfly to the above right of her head. To Annette's right is a rifle, black in colour, pointing downwards.

In June 2006 the "Death of Innocence" mural was repainted to include a colourful butterfly and the rifle broken, reflecting the overall futility of continued armed activity.

== See also ==
- Bogside Artists
- The Troubles in Derry
