= Paddy Doherty (activist) =

Northern Irish activist

Patrick Laurence Doherty (1926 – 7 January 2016), better known as Paddy 'Bogside' Doherty, was a Northern Irish activist from Derry, known for his activism in rebuilding the city after The Troubles.

As vice-chairman of the Derry Citizens Defence Association Doherty played a major role in the events of August 1969 which culminated in the Battle of the Bogside, and was a leading figure in Free Derry in the years following its establishment.

A carpenter and builder by trade, he later worked with the Irish Foundation for Human Development in Derry and founded the Inner City Trust.

He and Peter Hegarty authored Paddy Bogside in 2001.
