= Seán Keenan =

Irish republican (1914–1993)

- Seán Ó Cianáin
- Born: 1914; Derry, Ireland
- Died: 3 March 1993 (aged 78–79); Derry, Northern Ireland
- Organization: Derry Citizens Defence Association
- Known for: Former chairperson of Derry Citizens Defence Association and Honorary Vice-President of Republican Sinn Féin
- Political party: Republican Sinn Féin (from 1986); Sinn Féin (until 1986)
- Spouse: Nancy Ward (d. 1970)
- Children: Colm (d. 1972); Seán (d. 2006)
- Military career
- Paramilitary: Irish Republican Army (1969–1970); Provisional IRA (from 1970)
- Rank: Officer Commanding; Volunteer
- Unit: Derry Brigade
- Conflicts: The Troubles

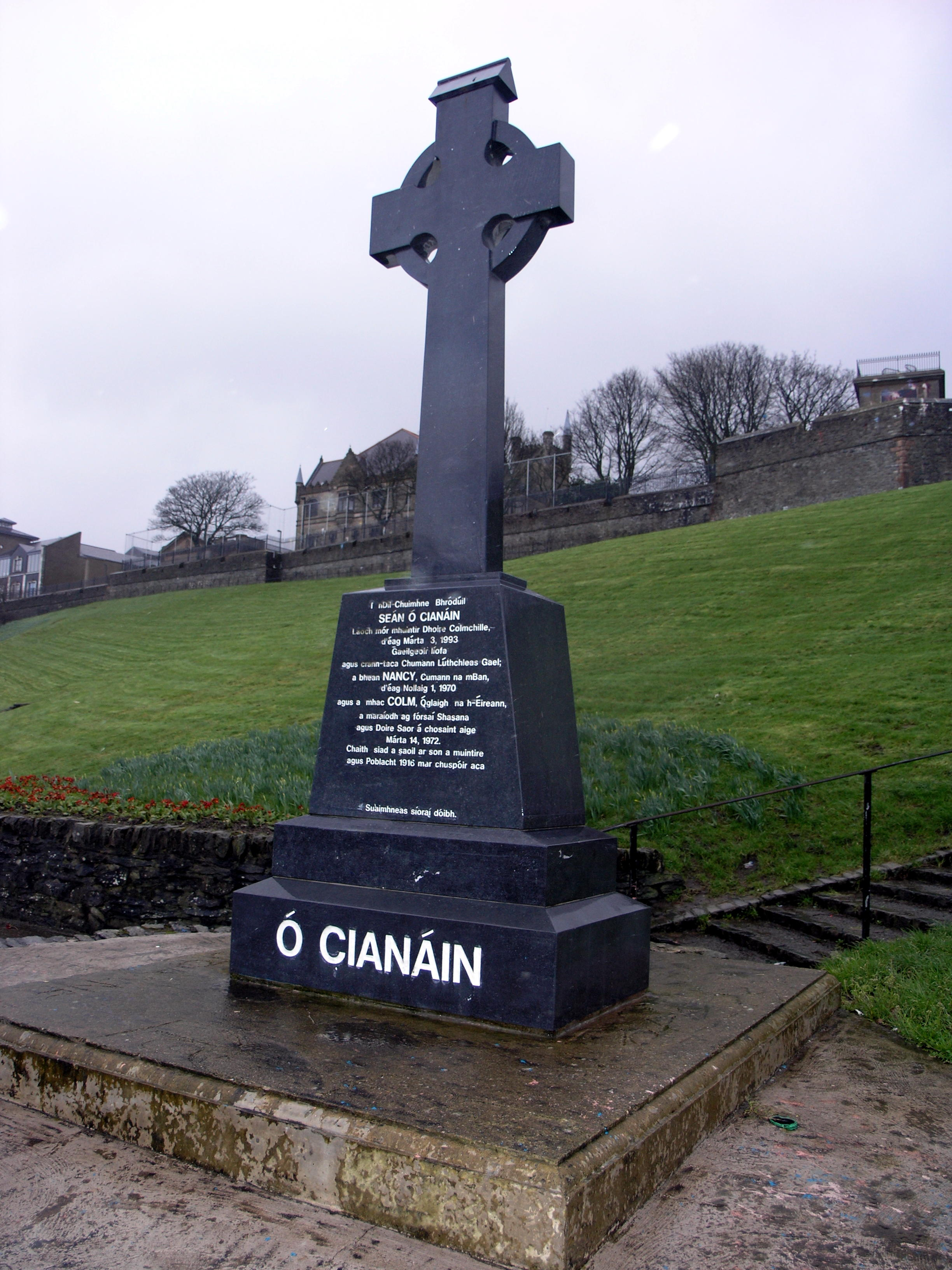
Sean Keenan memorial, Bogside, Derry

Seán Keenan (1914 – 3 March 1993) was an Irish republican from Derry, Northern Ireland. His father Seamus Keenan was a Quartermaster in the Irish Republican Army (IRA).

Keenan was interned without trial on three occasions: 1940–1945, 1957–1961, and 9 August 1971 – 27 April 1972. He spent a total of 15 years in jail despite never being convicted of an offence. Keenan was first arrested in 1935 for carrying an Irish flag. He was interned for the duration of World War II in several prisons including the prison hulk HMS Al Rawdah. He was again interned during the IRAs Border campaign and again during the period of conflict known as The Troubles. While interned on HMS Maidstone, Keenan was the Commanding Officer of the Provisional IRA prisoners there. In March 1972, a month before his final release, he was paroled for the funeral of his son Colm, a Provisional IRA officer who had been shot by the British Army.

In January 1969, following the Dublin leadership of the IRA rejecting Seán Mac Stíofáin's proposal to set up an auxiliary IRA unit in Derry to protect the Catholic areas of the city, Keenan and others established a local IRA unit. Keenan was chairman of the Derry Citizens Defence Association between July and October 1969 and played a prominent role in the events surrounding the creation and defence of Free Derry, including the Battle of the Bogside.

During the 1970 split within Sinn Féin and the IRA, Keenan sided with the Provisional faction; and later sided with Republican Sinn Féin during the 1986 split. In the late 1980s, he was made honorary Vice-President for life of the party until his death.

His wife Nancy Ward, a member of Cumann na mBan, was interned in Armagh Gaol in the early 1940s. She died in October 1970.

He is commemorated annually by Republican Sinn Féin in the month of March at the Seán Keenan Memorial (Celtic Cross) on Fahan Street in the Bogside area of Derry City.

His son, also named Sean, was a Sinn Féin councillor.

== See also ==
- Operation Demetrius
