= Kerb painting =

Act of painting road kerbs

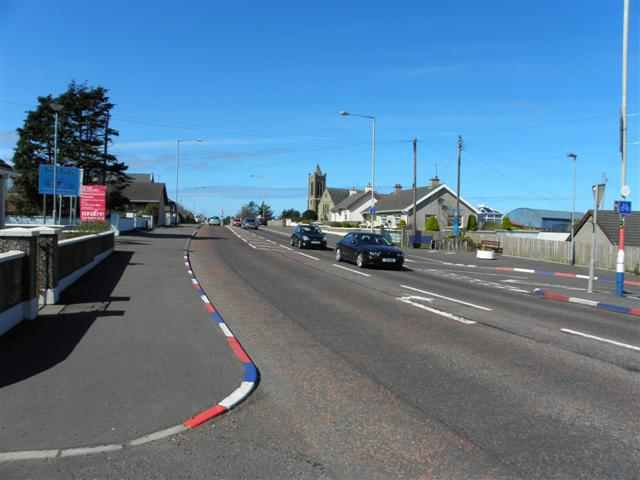
Unionist painted kerbs and lamp posts in Articlave, County Londonderry

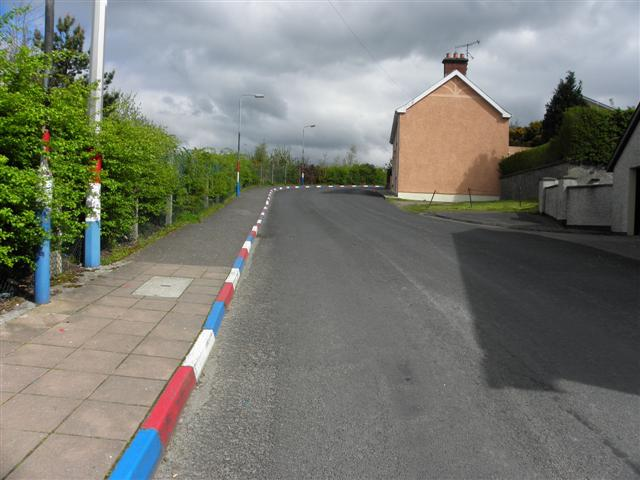
Unionist painted kerbs and lamp posts in Donemana, County Tyrone

Kerb painting is the painting of road kerbs, often used to improve their visibility or communicate a specific instruction, or as a method of political expression. It is commonly associated with Northern Ireland, where it is used by both unionists and nationalists to mark what they consider their territory and give the impression that everyone in that area shares the same affiliation. It is an offence to paint kerbs in Northern Ireland, though there have been few prosecutions. Highways authorities have trialled the use of paint-resistant plastic kerbs to counter the problem.

== Northern Ireland ==
Kerb painting is used in Northern Ireland by members of the unionist and nationalist communities. It is used to mark territories and boundaries and declare the sectarian affiliations of residents, in a similar fashion to sectarian murals. Street lights, litter bins and roundabout chevron stones have also been painted. Unionists use the colours of red, white and blue from the British Union Flag, and nationalists the green, white and orange of the Irish tricolour.

Painting of kerbs increases during the annual marching season. They are a source of annoyance for some residents of both political allegiances. There is an adage in Northern Ireland that one should never buy a house in a street where kerbs are painted, and the practice is said to have an adverse impact on local house prices. Leading Northern Ireland political parties Sinn Féin (nationalist) and the Democratic Unionist Party have both stated that they oppose the practice of kerb painting.

Kerb painting is prohibited by the Roads (Northern Ireland) Order 1993 and punishable by a fine of up to £500, though offenders are rarely prosecuted. Highways authorities have the right to remove or replace affected items. Occasionally council workers tasked with restoring the kerbs to their original, neutral colours have been prevented from doing so by residents. Kerb painting has been treated by the Police Service of Northern Ireland as a sectarian hate crime. This is somewhat rare, as to be classified as such the person making the crime report must perceive themselves to have been targeted as a result of their beliefs.

=== Paint resistant kerbs ===
Paint resistant plastic kerbs have been developed for the Northern Ireland market. These are made from recycled plastics and can be cleaned of paint by a road sweeper. The Roads Service carried out a trial of the products from 2005 and since then 15 councils have also used the product, though there has been no large scale replacement of existing kerbs.

== United States ==
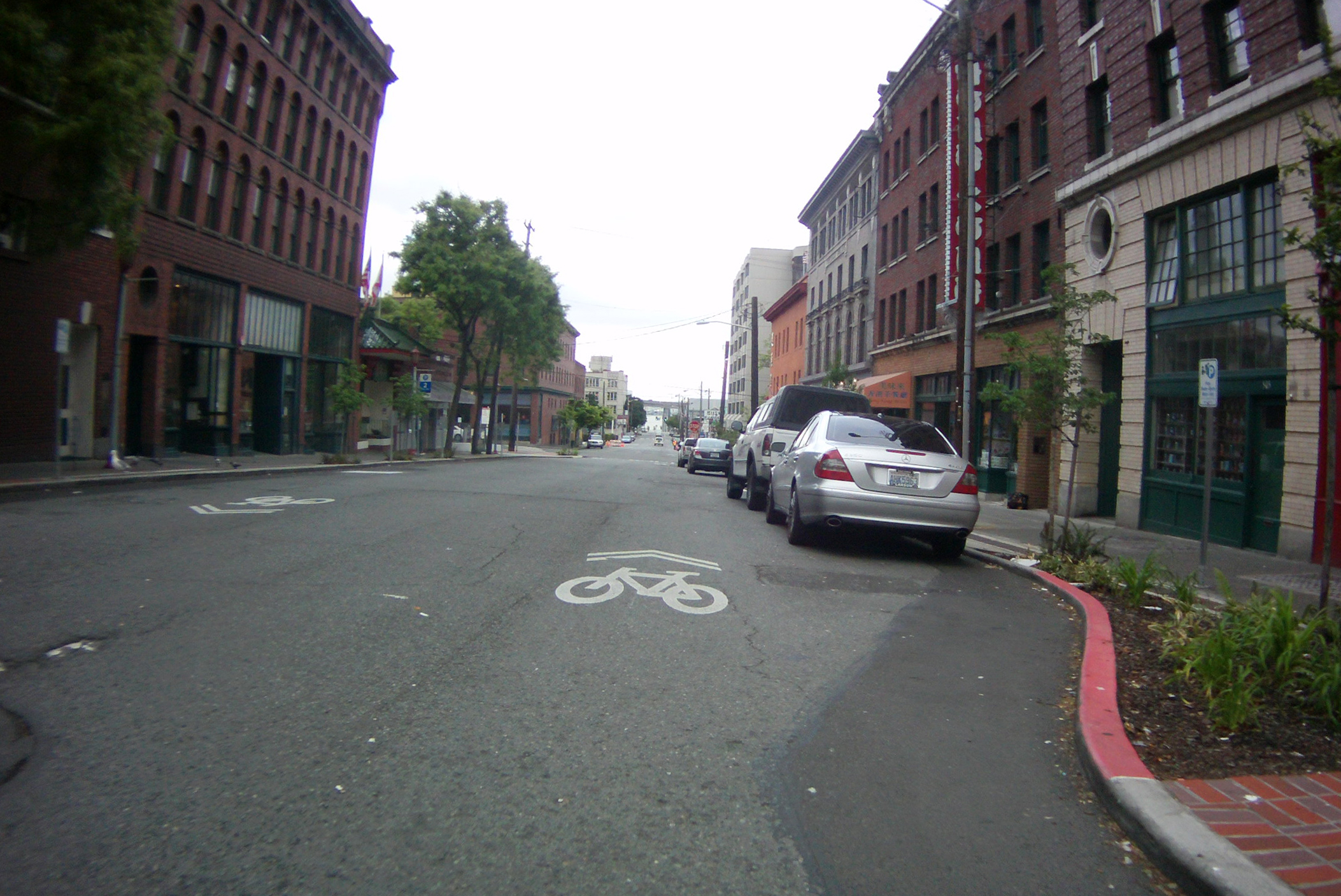
Red painted kerbs (at right) in a Seattle street

In the United States, it is relatively common to paint house numbers on road kerbs. This is sometimes done by businesses or non-profit organisations, though it may be considered illegal if done without permission, the kerb being considered the property of the highway authority. Some authorities in the US use painted kerbs to denote parking or waiting restrictions. For example, red kerbs often indicate that stopping or parking are forbidden; in California, red kerbs warn not to park within fire lanes. Painted kerbs have also been used to denote no parking restrictions in the approach to crosswalks.

== Elsewhere ==
In many countries, kerbs are often painted two alternating colours to improve their visibility.

Kerbs in Granby Street in Liverpool, England have been painted in the Rastafarian colours of green, yellow and black.
