= Derry Citizens' Defence Association =

The Derry Citizens' Defence Association (DCDA) was an organisation set up in Derry in July 1969 in response to a threat to nationalist residents from the Royal Ulster Constabulary (RUC) and civilian unionists, in connection with the annual parade of the Apprentice Boys of Derry on 12 August. This followed clashes with the RUC in January and April 1969, which resulted in widespread violence. The DCDA played a prominent role in co-ordinating the area's residents in the Battle of the Bogside, and was the effective government of the self-declared Free Derry from August to October 1969. Its leaders included Paddy Doherty, Seán Keenan, and Johnnie White. Keenan and White were well-known republicans.
