= Murals in Northern Ireland =

Political wall paintings in Northern Ireland

Murals in Northern Ireland have become symbols of Northern Ireland, depicting the region's past and present political and religious divisions.

Belfast and Derry are home to many of the most famous political murals in Europe. In 2014, the book The Belfast Mural Guide estimated that, in Belfast, there were approximately 300 quality murals on display, with many more in varying degrees of age and decay. Murals commemorate, communicate and display aspects of culture and history. The themes of murals are often reflections of what a particular community believes is important. Political murals exists to express ideas or messages and often reflect values of a certain group or community.

In Irish republican areas the themes of murals include the 1981 Irish hunger strike, with particular emphasis on strike leader Bobby Sands, murals of international solidarity with revolutionary groups, and murals highlighting a particular issue, for example the Ballymurphy Massacre or the McGurk's Bar bombing. In working class unionist communities, murals are used to promote Ulster loyalist paramilitary groups such as the Ulster Defence Association and Ulster Volunteer Force and commemorate their deceased members. However, traditional themes such as William of Orange and the Battle of the Boyne, the Battle of the Somme and the 36th Ulster Division are equally common.

== History ==
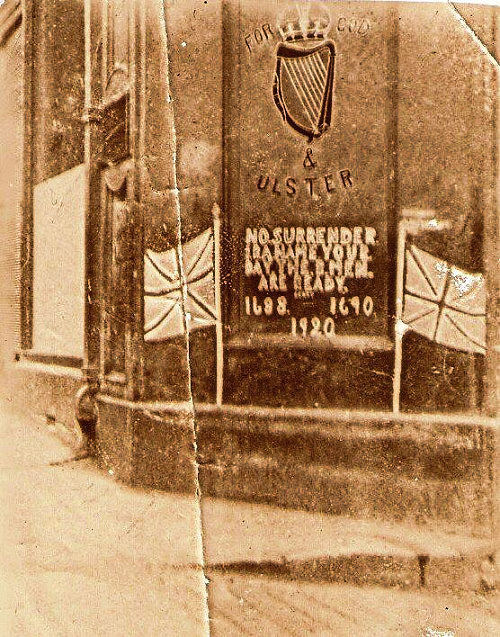
A Loyalist political mural in Derry circa 1920

Murals can be described as a mirror of political change, as they have been painted throughout the last century and display all important historic as well as political developments in the scope of unique wall paintings. In 1908 Ulster loyalists started to portray William of Orange on a white horse in order to strengthen the Orange identity of Ulster Protestants. Irish republican wall-paintings started in the late 1970s and can be seen in particular as a visual display of a social movement, which was radicalized after the IRA began to fight for a greater political voice and a United Ireland. Unionist murals quickly forewent general commemoration and became explicit signage of loyalist paramilitaries, a fixture that remained following the peace process although alongside an increase in commemorative murals. Republican murals, while often drawing upon the likes of Bobby Sands and the IRA, are less squarely militaristic featuring a broader repertoire that extends to Celtic mythology and international revolutionaries; their scope includes style, ranging from "anti-fascist propaganda to commercial film posters".

Murals are for the most part located in working class areas of Northern Ireland, primarily in Belfast and Derry. Arguably the most well-known and easily identified mural is that of Bobby Sands, on the side wall of Sinn Féin's Falls Road office. A close second is the collection of Irish republican and international-themed murals which are located at what is known as 'The International Wall', also in Belfast. In Derry, Free Derry Corner, where the slogan "You Are Now Entering Free Derry" was painted in 1969 shortly after the Battle of the Bogside, is prominent. Free Derry Corner has been used as a model for other murals in Northern Ireland, including the "You Are Now Entering Loyalist Sandy Row" mural in Belfast, which was a response to the republican message of Free Derry Corner, and the "You Are Now Entering Derry Journal Country" mural, which is an advertisement for a Derry publication.

Not all murals in Northern Ireland are directly political or sectarian in nature, with some commemorating events such as the Great Irish Famine, and other moments in Irish history. Many portray events from Irish mythology, and images from Irish myths are often incorporated into political murals. A few murals avoid the subject of Ireland altogether, instead focusing on such neutral subjects as litter prevention and the C. S. Lewis novel The Lion, the Witch and the Wardrobe. In Derry's city centre, a mural depicting the five principal characters from the TV show Derry Girls was painted on the side of a pub, with the mural being updated during the COVID-19 pandemic in 2020 and prior to the airing of the show's final series in 2022. Murals representing peace and tolerance are becoming increasingly popular with school groups who have children either design or actually paint murals in areas around their schools. With many paramilitaries now involved in community work, there has been a move to decommission many of the hard-edged murals across Northern Ireland (although this trend is reversed in times of tension). This change was further highlighted in 2007, when the Bogside Artists were invited to Washington, D.C. for the Smithsonian Folk Life Festival. The three artists were invited to recreate murals in the Washington Mall.

== Examples ==
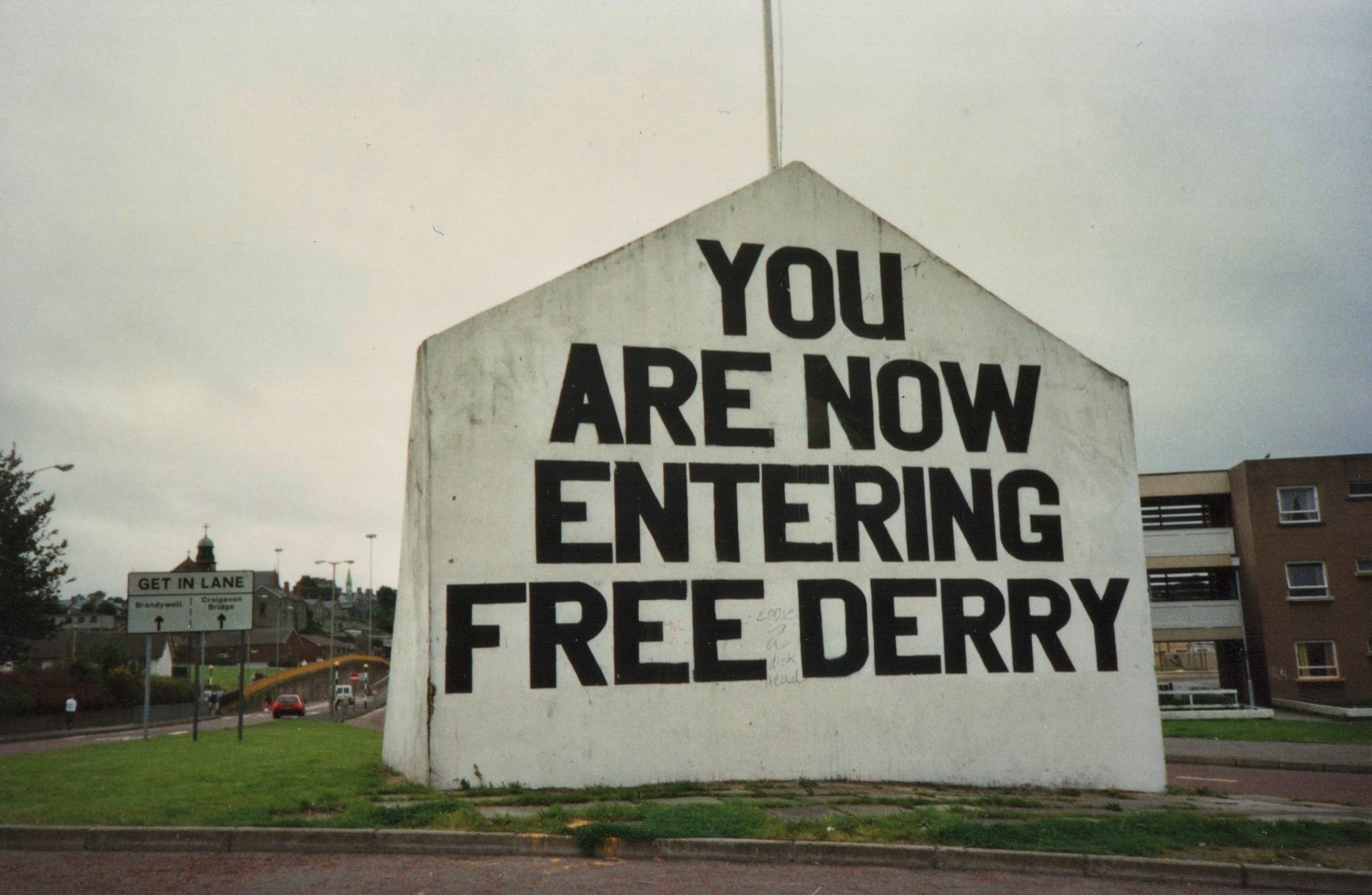
Free Derry Corner in 1990

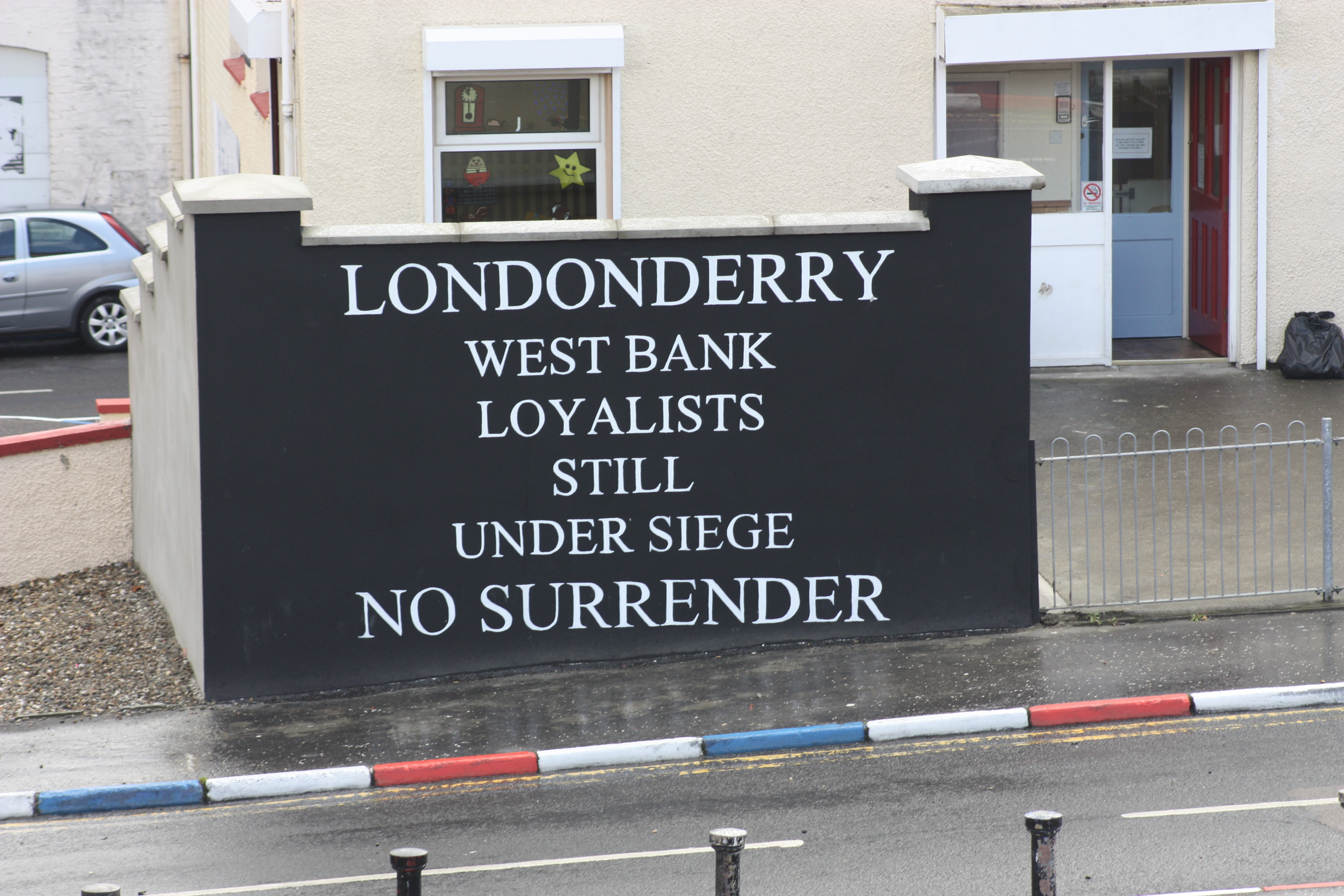
A mural in a loyalist enclave of Derry

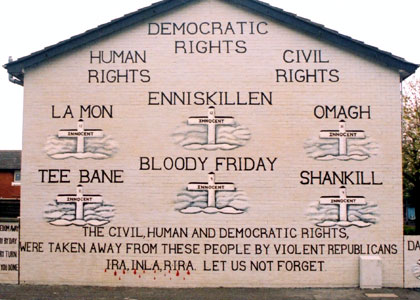
A mural in Belfast depicting Republican killings

== See also ==
- Kerb painting
- Propaganda
- Public art
