= Dissident Irish republican campaign =

1994–present republican insurgency in Northern Ireland

Dissident Irish Republican Campaign
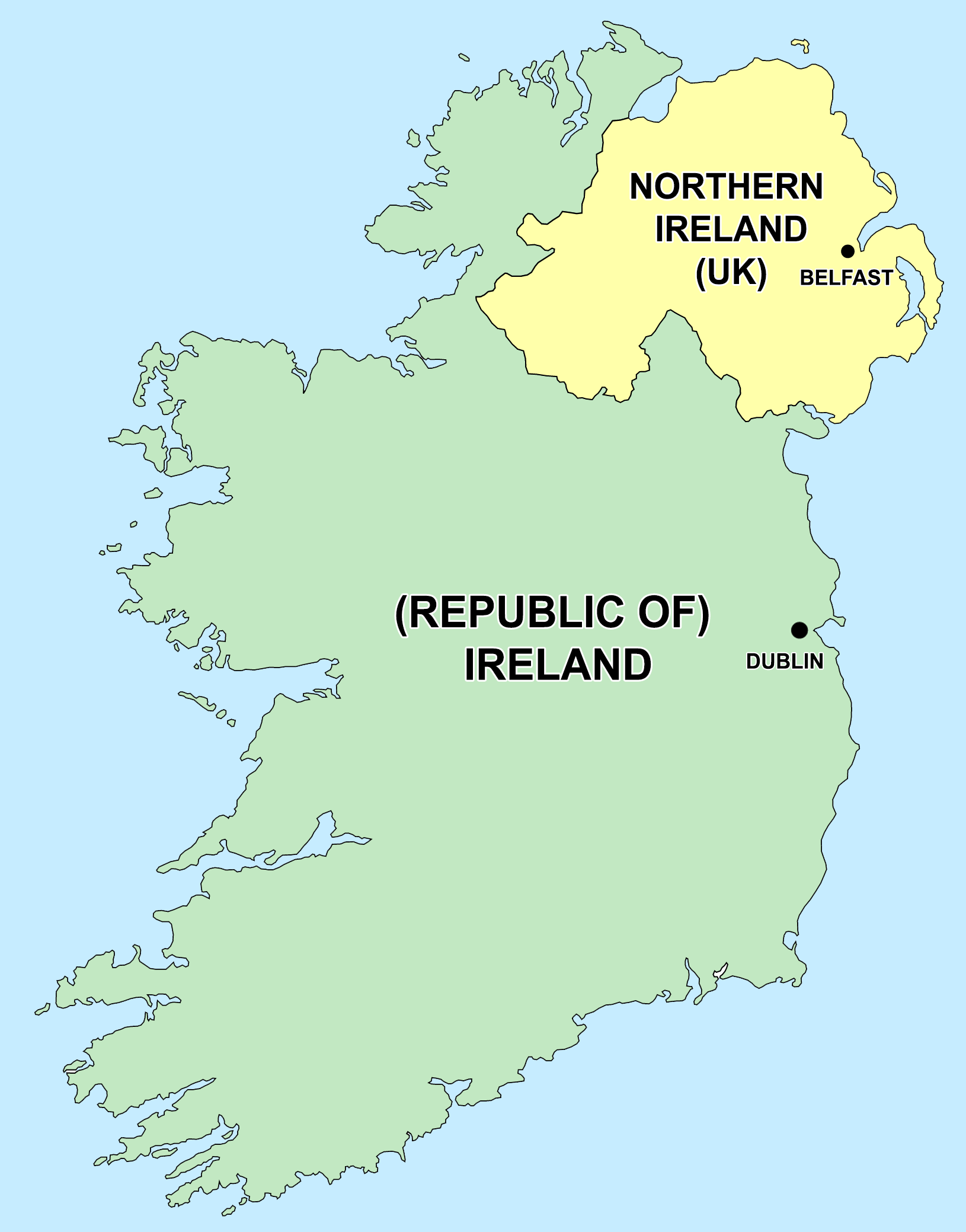
- Map of Ireland
Date	1994 – present
Location	Northern Ireland, with occasional violence in the Republic of Ireland and England
Status	Ongoing

Belligerents
United Kingdom: Police Service of Northern Ireland (since 2001); Royal Ulster Constabulary (1998–2001) (Note: Succeeded by the PSNI.); British Army (1998–2007) (Note: Since then, only in a minor capacity with its bomb disposal expertise (Operation Helvetic).); Republic of Ireland: Garda Síochána	Dissident republican paramilitaries: Arm na Poblachta (since 2017); Continuity IRA (since 1986); New IRA (since 2012); Óglaigh na hÉireann (2009–2018; ceasefire); Real IRA (1997–2012) (Note: Merged into the NIRA.); RAAD (2009–2012)

The dissident Irish republican campaign began in 1994 towards the end of the Troubles, a 30-year political conflict in Northern Ireland. Since the Provisional Irish Republican Army (IRA or PIRA) called ceasefires in 1994 and 1997, breakaway groups opposed to the ceasefire and to the peace agreements (dissident Irish republicans) have continued a low-level armed campaign against the security forces in Northern Ireland. Dissident republicans have targeted the Police Service of Northern Ireland (PSNI) (Note: Successor to the Royal Ulster Constabulary.) and the British Army in gun and bomb attacks as well as with mortars and rockets. They have also carried out bombings that are meant to cause disruption. However, their campaign has not been as intensive as the Provisional IRA's and political support for dissident groups is "tending towards zero".

In 2007, the government declared the end of Operation Banner, ending the four-decade long deployment of the British Army in Northern Ireland. As a result, the PSNI has since been the main target of attacks.

To date, two British soldiers, two PSNI officers and two Prison Service guards have been killed as part of the republican campaign. At least 50 civilians (and former combatants) have also been killed by republican paramilitaries, 29 of whom died in the Omagh bombing carried out by the Real IRA.

== Background ==
Since the 1169 invasion of Ireland by Norman knights at the request of ousted King of Leinster Dermot MacMurrough, Ireland has, in part or in whole, been under English, and later British, administration. Rebellions against rule from Great Britain were unsuccessful until 1919–1921's Anglo-Irish War, when the original Irish Republican Army (IRA) succeeded in removing 26 of Ireland's 32 counties from the United Kingdom of Great Britain and Ireland as the Irish Free State. Although previously, the offer of Irish Home rule was agreed in the third Home Rule Bill, implementation was suspended by violent opposition in Ulster and the forming of the UVF, and later by the outbreak of the First World War. Following the partition of Ireland by the Crown, the remaining six counties, located in the province of Ulster, became Northern Ireland and remained a part of the renamed United Kingdom of Great Britain and Northern Ireland.

A civil war followed in the new southern state, and the IRA split for the first time, into the Irish National Army—the war's victor, which became the army of the Free State—and the Anti-Treaty IRA, which was opposed to the treaty that had partitioned Ireland into two states.

The IRA ceased to be a significant force following its defeat in the Civil War, and it was not until a further split, into the Official IRA and Provisional IRA (PIRA) following the 1969 Northern Ireland riots, that a group calling itself the Irish Republican Army—the Provisional IRA—would again come to prove a significant military force. As a belligerent in what would come to be known as the Troubles, the PIRA waged an armed campaign against the British state that lasted until 1997 and claimed around 1800 lives.

The PIRA called an indefinite ceasefire in 1997 and decommissioned its arms in 2005 in accordance with the 1998 Good Friday Agreement, but a number of hardline splinter groups, known as dissident republicans, have vowed to continue using "armed struggle" to achieve the republican aim of a united Ireland.

Motivations for continued violence vary by group; for the more conservative Continuity IRA, the Provisionals' ending of abstentionist politics at the 1986 General Army Convention (GAC) served as a catalyst for tension. For ONH; the acceptance by the Sinn Féin special Ard Fheis of the PSNI and the Real IRA's "criminality", whilst for the majority of Dissident Republicans and the RIRA/NIRA the cause was the Belfast Good Friday Agreement.

== The campaign ==
=== Beginning of the campaign ===
In August 1994, the Provisional IRA called a ceasefire. In January 1996 the Continuity IRA announced its existence and vowed to continue the armed campaign against British rule in Northern Ireland. A month later, the Provisional IRA called-off its ceasefire because of its dissatisfaction with the state of the peace negotiations. On 13 July the CIRA detonated a car bomb outside Kilyhelvin Hotel in Enniskillen, County Fermanagh. The blast caused serious damage and injured 17 people as they were being evacuated from the hotel. Over the following year it planted another three cars bombs in Belfast, Derry and Fermanagh, but all were defused by the British Army. The Provisional IRA called a second ceasefire in July 1997. On 16 September 1997, the CIRA detonated a van bomb outside the Royal Ulster Constabulary (RUC) base in Markethill, causing widespread damage. The bombing happened a day after Sinn Féin joined the political negotiations which led to the Good Friday Agreement.

In November 1997, high-ranking Provisional IRA members who opposed the ceasefire formed a breakaway group that would become known as the Real IRA. During the first half of 1998 the Real IRA and Continuity IRA launched a string of car bomb and mortar attacks on RUC bases. There were car bombings in Moira on 20 February and in Portadown on 23 February. There was a mortar attack on Armagh RUC base on 10 March, and on two British Army bases in South Armagh on 24 March. On 10 April, after two years of intensive negotiations, the Good Friday Agreement was signed. Further mortars were launched at RUC bases in Belfast on 4 May and Belleek on 9 May, but missed their targets. On 22 May, referendums on the Agreement were held in Northern Ireland and the Republic of Ireland. In Northern Ireland, the vote was 71% in favour, while in the Republic the vote was 94% in favour.

On 1 August, following a telephoned warning, a RIRA car bomb detonated in the centre of Banbridge, injuring two RUC officers and 33 civilians.

==== Omagh bombing ====
On 15 August 1998 the RIRA left a car containing 500 lb of home-made explosives in the centre of Omagh, County Tyrone. The bombers could not find a parking space near the intended target of the courthouse, and the car was left 400 metres away. Three inaccurate telephone warnings were issued, and the RUC believed the bomb was actually located outside the courthouse. They attempted to establish a security cordon to keep civilians clear of the area, which inadvertently pushed people closer to the actual location of the bomb. Shortly after, the bomb exploded killing 29 people and injuring 220 others, in what became the deadliest attack of the Troubles inside Northern Ireland.

The bombing caused a major outcry throughout the world, and the Irish and British governments introduced new legislation in an attempt to destroy the organisation. The RIRA also came under pressure from the Provisional IRA, when Provisional IRA members visited the homes of 60 people connected with the RIRA and ordered them to disband and stop interfering with Provisional IRA arms dumps. With the organisation under intense pressure, the RIRA called a ceasefire on 8 September.

Following the Omagh bombing, there was a lull in dissident republican activity; mainly due to the RIRA ceasefire and the arrests of prominent dissident republican militants. The RIRA used the ceasefire to re-group and re-arm. Meanwhile, the CIRA carried out a number of minor attacks.

=== 2000–2009 ===
The Real IRA called off its ceasefire in January 2000, declaring: "Once again, Óglaigh na hÉireann declares the right of the Irish people to the ownership of Ireland. We call on all volunteers loyal to the Irish Republic to unite to uphold the Republic and establish a permanent national parliament representative of all the people". There was a surge of activity over the next two years. During this time, republicans carried out a series of bomb and mortar attacks on British Army and RUC bases, including a car bomb attack on Stewartstown RUC base in July 2000. That November, an RUC officer lost a leg when a booby trap bomb exploded outside Castlewellan RUC base. In June 2001, the Real IRA opened fire on RUC officers at a polling station in Ballinascreen, wounding two officers and a civilian. It was thought to be the first close-range gun attack on officers since 1997.

The Real IRA also carried out a number of bombings in London during 2000–2001; the first republican attacks there since 1997. In June 2000, a bomb damaged Hammersmith Bridge and in September an RPG-22 rocket struck the SIS Building, headquarters of the Secret Intelligence Service, also known as the MI6. In February 2001 a British Army cadet lost a hand when a booby-trap bomb exploded outside the 4th Battalion, Parachute Regiment's barracks in west London. The following month a car bomb exploded outside the BBC Television Centre, after a telephoned warning. Another car bomb that exploded near Ealing Broadway station in August left extensive damage in the area. In November, a third car bomb partially exploded in Birmingham city centre.

In November 2001, the Royal Ulster Constabulary (RUC) became the Police Service of Northern Ireland (PSNI). The reform of the RUC had been a main demand of Irish republicans and nationalists. However, Sinn Féin—the main republican party—refused to support the PSNI until the reforms were fully implemented. Dissident republicans made clear that they would never support a "British paramilitary police force" in any part of Ireland.

In August 2002, a booby-trap bomb exploded at a British Army base in Derry. It killed a civilian contractor—a former British soldier—who was working at the base.

On 17 August 2003, the RIRA killed Danny McGurk, a civilian, in West Belfast. The group later issued a statement offering an apology and saying that the killing was "criminally wrong and detracted from the goal of Irish liberation".

Over the following few years, dissident republican activity gradually waned. This was mainly due to internal tensions and police actions. There were splits within the paramilitary groups, especially within the Continuity IRA. In 2006, a group calling itself Óglaigh na hÉireann or ONH emerged; over the following years it would become the most active republican paramilitary after the RIRA.

In 2005, the mainstream IRA—having been on ceasefire since 1997—formally ended its campaign and decommissioned its weapons. In 2007, following the St Andrews Agreement, Sinn Féin finally voted to support the PSNI. Some of Sinn Féin's support base opposed these moves. They believed Sinn Féin had "sold out" and was moving closer to accepting the "British occupation". This led to more republicans lending their support to dissident groups. Following the IRA's declaration, the British Army greatly reduced its presence in Northern Ireland and left the PSNI in charge of security.

In March 2009 came the first security force fatalities since the end of the Troubles. The Real IRA shot dead two off-duty British soldiers as they collected a delivery outside Massereene Barracks in Antrim. Two other soldiers and two civilian deliverymen were also wounded by gunfire. Two days later, the Continuity IRA shot dead a PSNI officer responding to a call in Craigavon. This began the most intensive period of dissident activity since the campaign started. The number of attacks rose year-on-year, with 118 attacks in 2009, 239 the following year and a higher number the year after that.

On 12 April 2009, the RIRA claimed responsibility for shooting dead MI5 informant Denis Donaldson on 4 April 2006, at his cottage near Glenties, County Donegal, Republic of Ireland.

=== 2010–2019 ===
2010 saw the first car bombings in Northern Ireland in a decade. The first exploded outside the courthouse in Newry in February; a second exploded outside Palace Barracks (the NI headquarters of MI5) on 12 April; a third exploded outside Newtownhamilton PSNI base on 22 April; in August a fourth exploded outside Strand Road PSNI base in Derry; and in October a fifth exploded outside a bank in the same area, causing widespread damage. Also that year, a PSNI officer had to have his leg amputated after a booby-trap bomb exploded under his car.

In April 2011, another PSNI officer was killed when a booby-trap bomb exploded under his car in Omagh.

It was announced in July 2012 that Republican Action Against Drugs and a number of other small republican groups were merging with the Real IRA. The CIRA and the group calling itself ONH were not included in the merger. Some in the media referred to the grouping as the "New IRA". In November, the group shot dead a prison officer on the M1 motorway. The shots were fired from another car, which drove alongside his. He was the first prison officer to be killed since 1993.

In May 2013 republican militant Christine Connor twice attempted to bomb Police Service of Northern Ireland patrols by luring them with false calls to a house on Crumlin Road, Belfast.

Shortly after, the British Government announced that the 39th summit of the G8 would be held in June 2013 at the Lough Erne Resort in Fermanagh. Commentators said the British Government chose to hold it in Northern Ireland partly to "show the world that the peace process has worked and normality has returned". Security sources believed republicans would try to launch an attack during the summit, which "would hijack global headlines". In March 2013, a car bomb was defused near the resort. ONH said it had planned to detonate it at the hotel but had to abort the attack. A huge security operation was mounted for the summit and it passed off without incident.

In the run-up to Christmas 2013, there was a surge in dissident republican activity. This included the first bombings in Belfast city centre in a decade. On 25 November a car bomb partially exploded outside Victoria Square Shopping Centre and a PSNI base. A man was forced to drive the bomb to the spot and raised the alarm. On 13 December a small bomb exploded in a holdall outside St Anne's Square, following a telephoned warning. Nobody was hurt in the attacks, which were claimed by ONH. Also in December, two PSNI patrols were the target of automatic gunfire in Belfast.

In February 2014 the Real IRA (or 'New IRA') sent seven letter bombs to British Army recruitment offices in south-east England; the first time republican militants attacked inside Great Britain since 2001. The following month, a PSNI land rover was hit by a horizontal mortar in Belfast. A civilian car was also hit by debris, but there were no injuries. It was the first successful attack of its kind in more than ten years. A PSNI armoured jeep was hit by another horizontal mortar in Derry that November, blowing off a door and damaging a passing car. The Real IRA said it had fired an "EFP mortar-style device". In the security operation that followed, youths attacked the PSNI with stones and petrol bombs. Two weeks later, a PSNI land rover was attacked with a homemade rocket-propelled grenade launcher on Crumlin Road, Belfast. The warhead pierced the land rover's outer shell.

In November 2015, a PSNI vehicle was riddled with automatic gunfire in Belfast, with dissident republicans suspected of being responsible.

A booby-trap bomb detonated under a van driven by a prison officer, Adrian Ismay, on 4 March 2016. He died 11 days later. The New IRA claimed responsibility and said it was a response to the alleged mistreatment of republican prisoners at Maghaberry Prison.

A group using the name Arm na Poblachta (meaning 'Army of the Republic') claimed responsibility for planting a roadside explosive device in Belfast on 1 November 2017. It is also believed that Arm na Poblachta were responsible for the shooting death of Antrim man Raymond Johnston in 2018.

On 19 January 2019 there was a car bomb attack on the Bishop Street Courthouse in Derry, the first such attack in several years. In March, several letter bombs were found at Heathrow Airport, London City Airport and Waterloo station; the New IRA claimed responsibility.

On 18 April 2019, rioting erupted following police raids in Derry, during which a New IRA gunman opened fire on the PSNI, killing journalist Lyra McKee.

On 1 June 2019, a powerful improvised explosive device was found planted under a PSNI officer's car at a golf club in east Belfast. In the following days, the New IRA contacted The Irish News to claim responsibility.

The Continuity IRA was blamed for an attempted booby trap bomb attack on 26 July 2019. A call was made to a media outlet claiming a mortar had been fired at a police patrol. The PSNI went to the Tullygally road area in Craigavon to investigate the claim and discovered a fake mortar device along with a concrete block with the booby trap bomb inside of it.

On 19 August 2019, a bomb exploded outside the village of Newtownbutler in County Fermanagh allegedly targeting PSNI officers.

=== 2020 onward ===
On 5 February 2020, the PSNI found a bomb in a lorry parked in Lurgan. It is believed to have been planted by the CIRA, who intended to detonate it on Brexit day, 31 January 2020, when they thought it would be on a ferry, crossing the North Channel to Scotland.

On 14 January 2021, the CIRA claimed it had fired at a PSNI helicopter at Wattlebridge, South Fermanagh. It was later confirmed by PSNI officials that there were no PSNI helicopters deployed in the area and that the helicopter in question was likely a civilian helicopter. The attack was eventually debunked as a hoax.

On 19 April 2021, a bomb was planted next to the car of a part-time female PSNI officer in Dungiven, County Londonderry, and was subsequently defused. The New IRA later claimed responsibility.

On 12 March 2022, Arm na Poblachta left an unexploded bomb around the junction at Feeny Road and Killunaght Road, near Dungiven, County Londonderry. The bomb targeted a PSNI vehicle. The night of 17 November 2022, an explosive device was thrown to a police car in the town of Strabane and it exploded without the officers in the car getting hurt. Strabane resident Teresa Breslin, whose twin brother Charlie was a Republican militant killed by the SAS in an anti-IRA operation in the town, called the bomb attack "a bloody disgrace," calling it "something we never thought we’d go through again."

On 27 February 2023, the New IRA admitted in a typed statement it carried out the attempted murder of PSNI Detective Chief Inspector John Caldwell, who was shot multiple times by two gunmen in front of his son and other children after a youth football session he had been coaching on 22 February 2023. As of 26 February 2023 the PSNI had arrested six people in connection with the attempted murder. Rallies in County Tyrone organized under the slogan 'No Going Back', in reference to the violence of The Troubles, condemned the shooting. The same month, Arm na Poblachta claimed responsibility for planting an explosive device in the Corrody Road area of Derry, which resulted in a security alert in the area.

On 4 March 2023, Arm na Poblachta issued threats against the families of PSNI officers. The threats were condemned by the Social Democratic and Labour Party member of the Legislative Assembly and Northern Ireland Policing Board member Mark H. Durkan. The same month, Northern Ireland Secretary Chris Heaton-Harris announced a raise in the terrorism threat level assessment from "substantial" to "severe" for Northern Ireland, a level indicating that an attack is "highly likely," which reversed a downgrade review in March 2022.

On 22 May 2024, PSNI forces arrested two men in Derry and seized an AK-47 variant assault rifle.

In May 2026, a 66-year-old man was charged with several offences, including terrorism, following a car bombing outside a police station in Dunmurry, Belfast.

In July 2026, Gardaí intercepted a car on the N2 near Carrickmacross, County Monaghan, and found an "extremely significant" explosive device. A woman was arrested at the scene, and a man was arrested later.

== See also ==
- Timeline of the Northern Ireland Troubles
