= Operation Banner =

1969–2007 British military operation in Northern Ireland during the Troubles

- Part of the Troubles and the dissident Irish republican campaign
- Two British Army soldiers at a checkpoint in Northern Ireland, 1988
Date	14 August 1969 – 31 July 2007 (37 years, 11 months, 2 weeks and 3 days)
Location	Northern Ireland
Result	Stalemate; Paramilitary ceasefires; Demilitarisation; Good Friday Agreement

Belligerents
British Armed Forces Royal Ulster Constabulary	Irish republican paramilitaries	Ulster loyalist paramilitaries

Strength
- 21,000 British soldiers 6,500 UDR; Total: c. 40,500

Casualties and losses
722 deaths from paramilitary attacks; 719 deaths from other causes; 6,100 injured; Total deaths: 1,441	PIRA 97 killed by British Army; INLA 5 killed by British Army; IPLO 1 killed by British Army; 1 OIRA killed by British Army	UVF 7 killed by British Army; UDA 7 killed by British Army

Operation Banner was the operational name for the British Armed Forces' operation in Northern Ireland from 1969 to 2007, as part of the Troubles. It was the longest continuous deployment in British military history. The British Army was initially deployed, at the request of the unionist government of Northern Ireland, in response to the August 1969 riots. Its role was to support the Royal Ulster Constabulary (RUC) and to assert the authority of the British government in Northern Ireland. This involved counter-insurgency and supporting the police in carrying out internal security duties such as guarding key points, mounting checkpoints and patrols, carrying out raids and searches, riot control and bomb disposal. More than 300,000 soldiers served in Operation Banner. At the peak of the operation in the 1970s, about 21,000 British troops were deployed, most of them from Great Britain. As part of the operation, a new locally-recruited regiment was also formed: the Ulster Defence Regiment (UDR).

The Provisional Irish Republican Army (IRA) waged a guerrilla campaign against the British military from 1970 to 1997. Catholic hostility to the British military's deployment grew after incidents such as the Falls Curfew (1970), Operation Demetrius (1971) and Bloody Sunday (1972). In their efforts to defeat the IRA, there were incidents of collusion between British soldiers and Ulster loyalist paramilitaries. From the late 1970s the British government adopted a policy of "Ulsterisation", which meant giving a greater role to local forces: the UDR and RUC. After the Good Friday Agreement in 1998, the operation was gradually scaled down, most military facilities were removed and the vast majority of British troops were withdrawn.

According to the Ministry of Defence, 1,441 serving British military personnel died in Operation Banner; 722 of whom were killed in paramilitary attacks, and 719 of whom died as a result of other causes. It suffered its greatest loss of life in the Warrenpoint ambush of 1979.

== Description of the operation ==
The British Army was initially deployed, at the request of the unionist government of Northern Ireland, in response to the August 1969 riots. Its role was to support the Royal Ulster Constabulary (RUC) and to assert the authority of the British government in Northern Ireland. The main opposition to the British military's deployment came from the Provisional Irish Republican Army (IRA). It waged a guerrilla campaign against the British military from 1970 to 1997. Catholic hostility to the British military's deployment increased after incidents such as the Falls Curfew (1970), Operation Demetrius (1971), the Ballymurphy Massacre (1971) and Bloody Sunday (1972). An internal British Army document released in 2007 stated that, whilst it had failed to defeat the IRA, it had made it impossible for the IRA to win through violence, and reduced substantially the death toll in the last years of conflict.

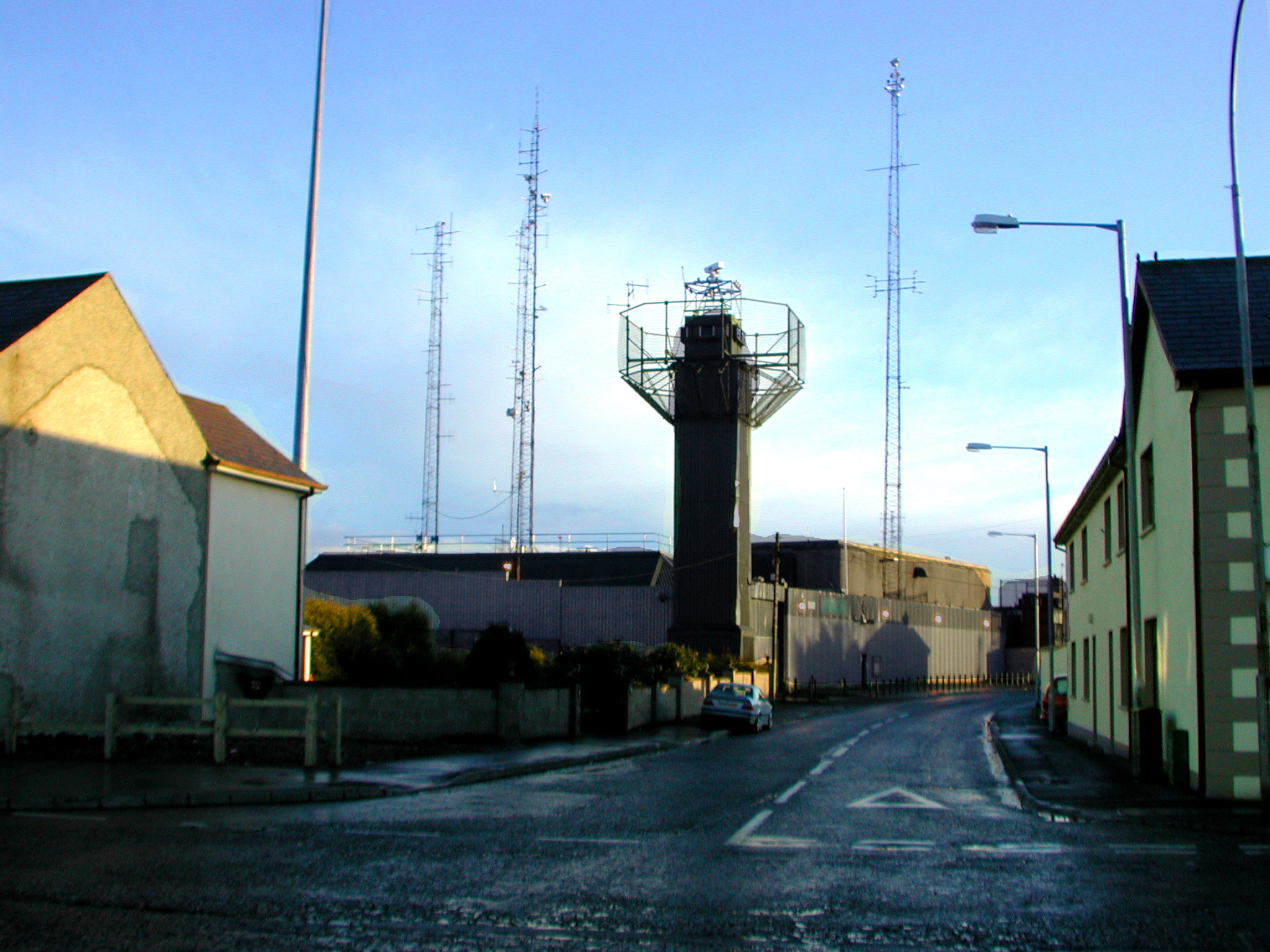
Crossmaglen RUC/Army base, showing a watchtower built during the operation that was later demolished as part of the demilitarisation process. The barracks were handed over to the PSNI in 2007.

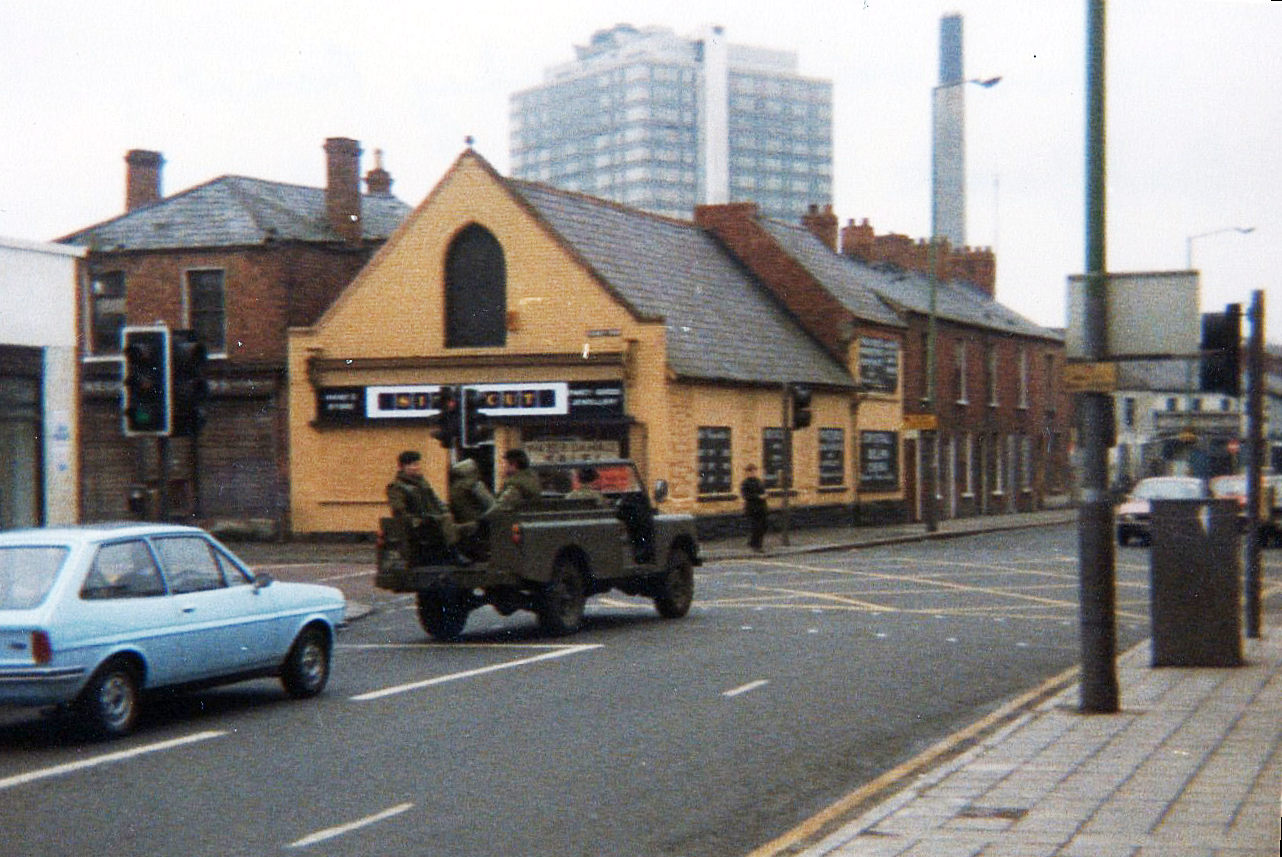
A British Army Land Rover patrolling South Belfast (1981)

From 1998, after the Good Friday Agreement, Operation Banner was gradually scaled down: patrols were suspended and several military barracks closed or dismantled, even before the start of the decommissioning of IRA armaments. The process of demilitarisation started in 1994, after the first IRA ceasefire. From the second IRA ceasefire in 1997 until the first act of decommissioning of weapons in 2001, almost 50% of the army bases were vacated or demolished along with surveillance sites and holding centres, while more than 100 cross-border roads were reopened.

Eventually in August 2005, it was announced that in response to the Provisional IRA declaration that its campaign was over, and in accordance with the Good Friday Agreement provisions, Operation Banner would end by 1 August 2007. From that date troops were to be based in Northern Ireland only for training purposes, and reduced in number to 5,000; responsibility for security was entirely transferred to the police. The Northern Ireland–resident battalions of the Royal Irish Regiment – which grew out of the Ulster Defence Regiment – were stood down on 1 September 2006. The operation officially ended at midnight on 31 July 2007, making it the longest continuous deployment in the British Army's history, lasting over 37 years.

While the withdrawal of troops was welcomed by nationalist political parties the Social Democratic and Labour Party and Sinn Féin, the unionist Democratic Unionist Party and Ulster Unionist Party opposed the decision, which they regarded as 'premature'. The main reasons behind their resistance were the continuing activity of republican dissident groups, the loss of security-related jobs for the Protestant community, and the perception of the British Army presence as an affirmation of the political union with Great Britain.

Adam Ingram, the Minister of State for the Armed Forces, has stated that assuming the maintenance of an enabling environment, British Army support to the PSNI after 31 July 2007 was reduced to a residual level, known as Operation Helvetic, providing specialised ordnance disposal and support to the PSNI in circumstances of extreme public disorder as described in Patten recommendations 59 and 66, should this be needed, thus ending the British Army's emergency operation in Northern Ireland.

== Role of the armed forces ==
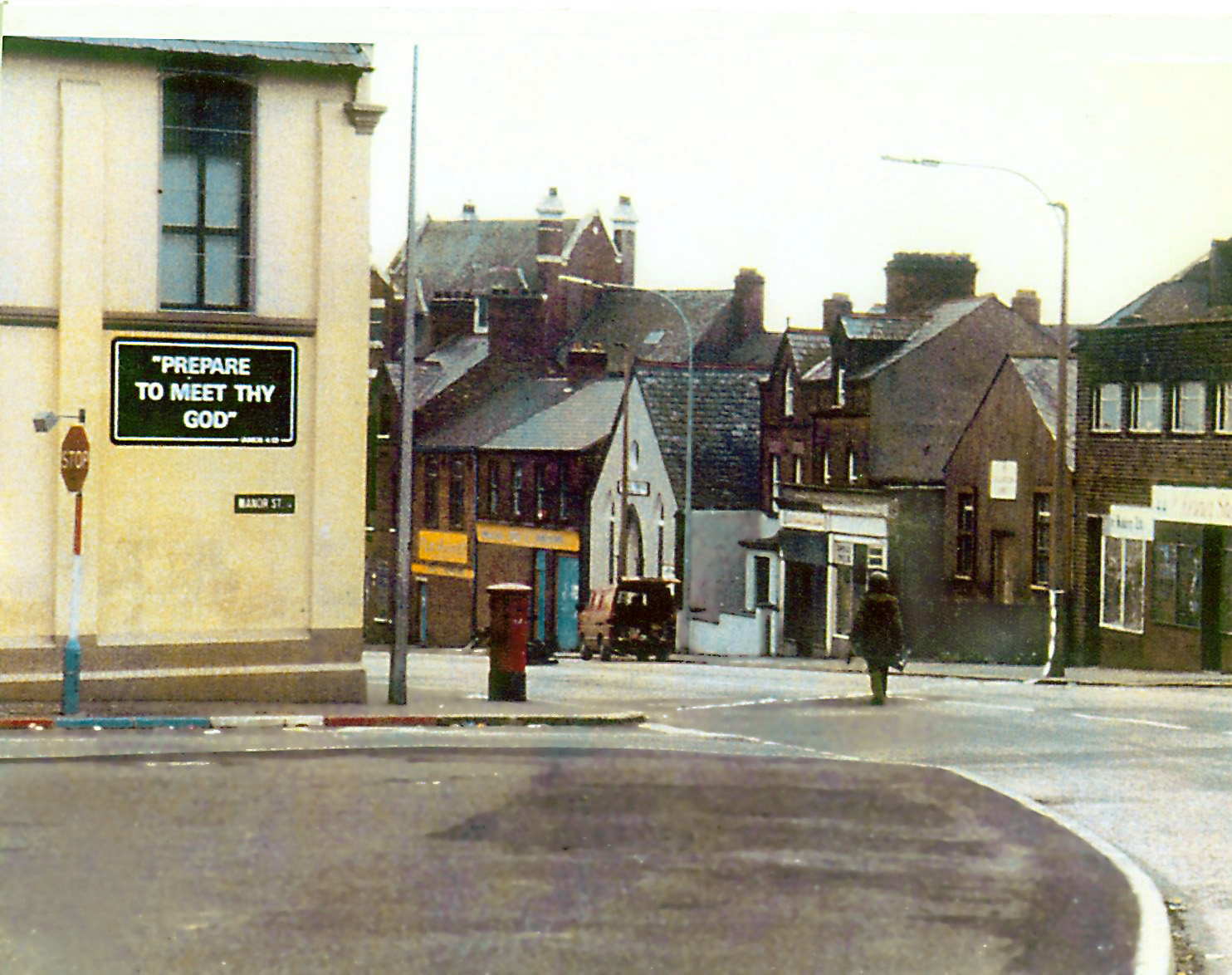
A British Army Ammunition Technical Officer approaches a suspect device in Belfast

The support to the police forces was primarily from the British Army, with the Royal Air Force providing helicopter support as required. A maritime component was supplied under the codename of Operation Grenada, by the Royal Navy and Royal Marines in direct support of the Army commitment. This was tasked with interdicting the supply of weapons and munitions to paramilitaries, acting as a visible deterrence by maintaining a conspicuous maritime presence on and around the coast of Northern Ireland and Lough Neagh.

The role of the armed forces in their support role to the police was defined by the Army in the following terms:

- "Routine support – Includes such tasks as providing protection to the police in carrying out normal policing duties in areas of terrorist threat; patrolling around military and police bases to deter terrorist attacks and supporting police-directed counter-terrorist operations"
- "Additional support – Assistance where the police have insufficient assets of their own; this includes the provision of observation posts along the border and increased support during times of civil disorder. The military can provide soldiers to protect and, if necessary, supplement police lines and cordons. The military can provide heavy plant to remove barricades and construct barriers, and additional armoured vehicles and helicopters to help in the movement of police and soldiers"
- "Specialist support – Includes bomb disposal, search and tracker dogs, and divers from the Royal Engineers"

== Number of troops deployed ==
At the peak of the operation in the 1970s, the British Army was deploying around 21,000 soldiers. By 1980, the figure had dropped to 11,000, with a lower presence of 9,000 in 1985. The total climbed again to 10,500 after the intensification of the IRA use of improvised mortars toward the end of the 1980s. In 1992, there were 17,750 members of all British military forces taking part in the operation. The British Army build-up comprised three brigades under the command of a lieutenant-general. There were six resident battalions deployed for a period of two and a half years and four roulement battalions serving six-months tours. In July 1997, during the course of fierce riots in nationalist areas triggered by the Drumcree conflict, the total number of security forces in Northern Ireland increased to more than 30,000 (including the RUC).

== Equipment ==
Vehicles, aircraft and ships used by the British military during Operation Banner, some of which were developed for the operation, include:

- Alvis Saracen
- Alvis Saladin
- Ferret armoured car
- Humber Pig
- Centurion AVRE 165 (Operation Motorman)
- Saxon
- Land Rovers, including the Snatch Land Rover
- Bell H-13 Sioux helicopter
- Aérospatiale Gazelle helicopter
- Aérospatiale SA 330 Puma helicopter
- Chinook helicopter
- Westland Lynx helicopter
- Westland Wessex helicopter
- Westland Scout helicopter
- de Havilland Canada DHC-2 Beaver surveillance aircraft
- Britten-Norman Defender surveillance aircraft
- HMS Bildeston
- HMS Cygnet
- HMS Kingfisher
- HMS Fearless (Operation Motorman)
- HMS Maidstone (as a prison ship)

== Controversies ==
The British military was responsible for about 10% of all deaths in the conflict. According to one study, the British military killed 306 people during Operation Banner, 156 (~51%) of whom were unarmed civilians. Another study says the British military killed 301 people, 160 (~53%) of whom were unarmed civilians. Of the civilians killed, 61 were children. Only four soldiers were convicted of murder while on duty in Northern Ireland. All were released after serving two or three years of life sentences and allowed to rejoin the Army. Senior Army officers privately lobbied successive Attorneys General not to prosecute soldiers, and the Committee on the Administration of Justice says there is evidence soldiers were given some level of immunity from prosecution. Elements of the British Army also colluded with illegal loyalist paramilitaries responsible for numerous attacks on civilians (see below). Journalist Fintan O'Toole argues that "both militarily and ideologically, the Army was a player, not a referee".

=== Relationship with the Catholic community ===
During the first weeks, many in the Catholic community in Derry welcomed the deployment, hoping it would be a temporary measure that restored order after the riots. Others opposed it from the outset. The troops initially did not undertake any active policing duties; they took up positions around barricaded Catholic neighbourhoods but did not enter, and tacitly recognised the authority of the Derry Citizens' Defence Association in those areas. Once barricades were dismantled in September 1969 and British troops began manning checkpoints, patrolling neighbourhoods, and conducting searches, relations deteriorated rapidly.

Such a deterioration of relations played out across Northern Ireland. The British Army's support of the RUC and the unionist government "gradually earned it a reputation of bias" in favour of Protestants and unionists. In the campaign against the IRA, Catholic areas were frequently subjected to house raids, checkpoints, patrols and curfews that Protestant areas avoided. There were frequent claims of soldiers physically and verbally abusing Catholics during these searches. In some neighbourhoods, clashes between Catholic residents and British troops became a regular occurrence. In April 1970, Ian Freeland, the British Army's overall commander in Northern Ireland, announced that anyone throwing petrol bombs would be shot dead if they did not heed a warning from soldiers.

The Falls Curfew in July 1970 was a major blow to relations between the British Army and Catholics. A weapons search in the mainly Catholic Falls area of Belfast developed into a riot and then gun battles with the IRA. The British Army then imposed a 36-hour curfew and arrested all journalists inside the curfew zone. A large amount of CS gas was fired into the area while hundreds of homes and businesses were forcibly searched for weapons. The Army also admitted there had been looting by some soldiers. Four civilians were killed by the British Army during the operation, and another 60 suffered gunshot wounds.

On 9 August 1971, internment (imprisonment without trial) was introduced in Northern Ireland. Soldiers launched dawn raids and interned almost 350 people suspected of IRA involvement. This sparked four days of violence in which 20 civilians were killed and thousands were forced to flee their homes. Of the 17 civilians killed by British soldiers, 11 of them were in the Ballymurphy Massacre. No loyalists were included in the sweep, and many of those arrested were Catholics with no provable paramilitary links. Many internees reported being beaten, verbally abused, threatened, denied sleep and starved. Some internees were taken to a secret interrogation centre for a program of "deep interrogation".

The five techniques, the interrogation techniques, were described by the European Court of Human Rights as "inhuman and degrading", and by the European Commission of Human Rights as "torture". The operation led to mass protests and a sharp increase in violence over the following months. Internment lasted until December 1975, with 1,981 people interned.

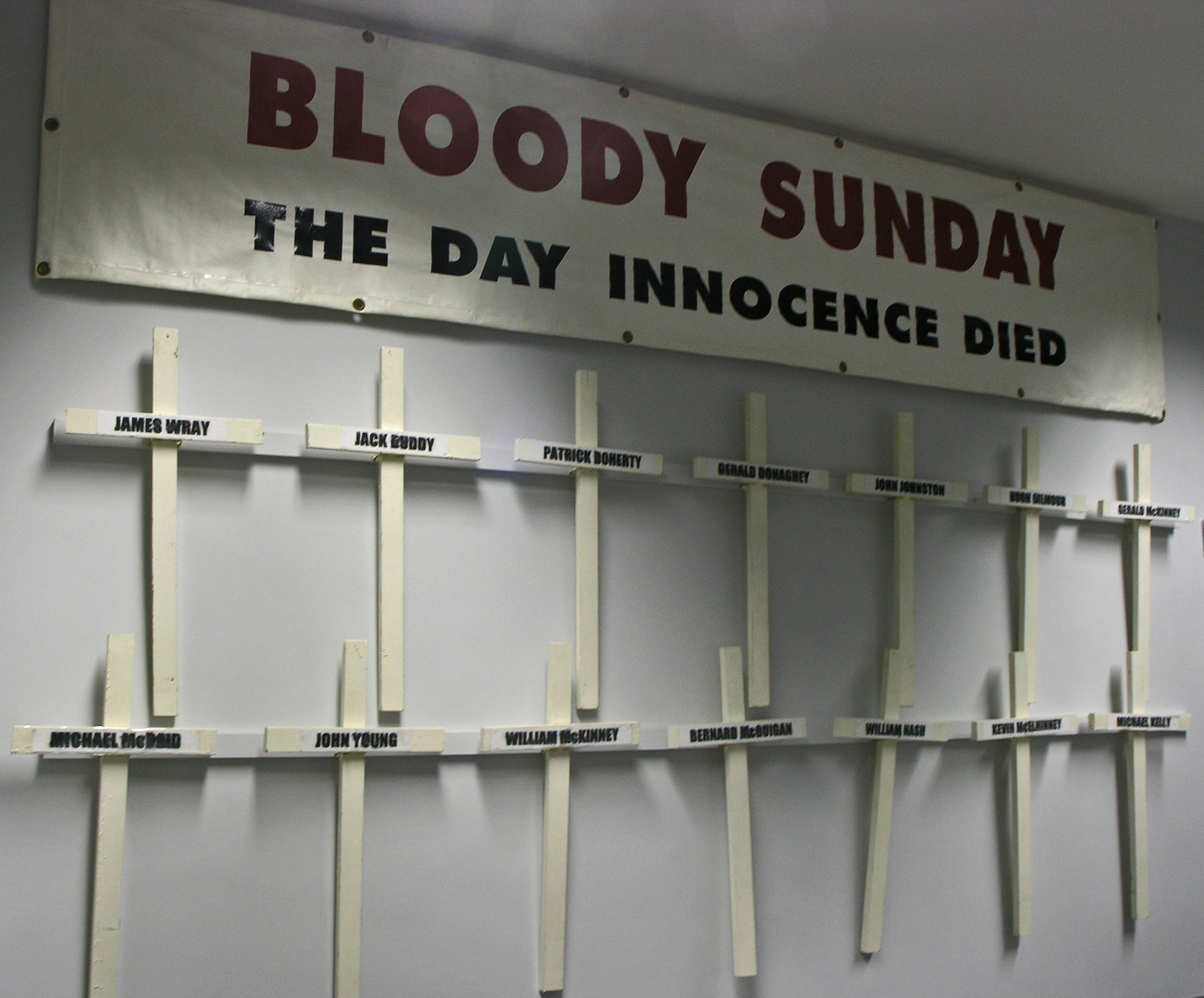
Banner and crosses carried by the families of the Bloody Sunday victims on the yearly commemoration march

The incident that most damaged the relationship between the British Army and the Catholic community was Bloody Sunday, 30 January 1972. During an anti-internment march in Derry, 26 unarmed Catholic protesters and bystanders were shot by soldiers from the 1st Battalion, Parachute Regiment; fourteen died. Some were shot from behind or while trying to help the wounded. The Widgery Tribunal largely cleared the soldiers of blame, but it was regarded as a "whitewash" by the Catholic community. A second inquiry, the Saville Inquiry, concluded in 2010 that the killings were "unjustified and unjustifiable".

On 9 July 1972, British troops in Portadown used CS gas and rubber bullets to clear Catholics who were blocking an Orange Order march through their neighbourhood. The British Army then let the Orangemen march into the Catholic area escorted by at least 50 masked and uniformed Ulster Defence Association (UDA) militants. At the time, the UDA was a legal organisation. That same day in Belfast, British snipers shot dead five Catholic civilians, including three children, in the Springhill Massacre. On the night of 3–4 February 1973, British Army snipers shot dead four unarmed men (one of whom was an IRA member) in the Catholic New Lodge area of Belfast.

In the early hours of 31 July 1972, the British Army launched Operation Motorman to re-take Northern Ireland's "no-go areas", mostly Catholic neighbourhoods that had been barricaded by the residents to keep out the security forces and loyalists. During the operation, the British Army shot four people in Derry, killing a 15-year-old Catholic civilian and an unarmed IRA member.

From 1971 to 1973, a secret British Army unit, the Military Reaction Force (MRF), carried out undercover operations in Belfast. It killed and wounded a number of unarmed Catholic civilians in drive-by shootings. The British Army initially claimed the civilians had been armed, but no evidence was found to support that. Former MRF members later admitted that the unit shot unarmed people without warning, both IRA members and civilians. One member said, "We were not there to act like an army unit, we were there to act like a terror group". At first, many of the drive-by shootings were blamed on Protestant loyalists. Republicans claim the MRF sought to draw the IRA into a sectarian conflict to divert it from its campaign against the state.

In May 1992, there were clashes between paratroopers and Catholic civilians in the town of Coalisland, triggered by a bomb attack on a British Army patrol in nearby Cappagh that severed the legs of a paratrooper. The soldiers ransacked two pubs, damaged civilian cars and opened fire on a crowd. Three civilians were hospitalized with gunshot wounds. As a result, the Parachute Regiment was redeployed outside urban areas and the brigadier at 3 Infantry Brigade, Tom Longland, was relieved of his command.

=== Collusion with loyalist paramilitaries ===
There were incidents of collusion between the British Army and loyalist paramilitaries throughout the conflict. This included soldiers taking part in loyalist attacks while off-duty, giving weapons or intelligence to loyalists, not taking action against them, and hindering police investigations. The Army also had double agents and informers within loyalist groups who organised attacks on the orders of, or with the knowledge of, their Army handlers. The De Silva report found that, during the 1980s, 85% of the intelligence that loyalists used to target people came from the security forces. A 2006 Irish Government report concluded that British soldiers also helped loyalists with attacks in the Republic of Ireland.

The Army's locally-recruited UDR was almost wholly Protestant. Despite the vetting process, loyalist militants managed to enlist; mainly to obtain weapons, training and intelligence. A 1973 British Government document (uncovered in 2004), "Subversion in the UDR", suggested that 5–15% of UDR soldiers then were members of loyalist paramilitaries. The report said the UDR was the main source of weapons for those groups, although by 1973 weapons losses had dropped significantly, partly due to stricter controls. By 1990, at least 197 UDR soldiers had been convicted of loyalist terrorist offences and other serious crimes including bombings, kidnappings and assaults. Nineteen were convicted of murder and 11 for manslaughter. This was only a small fraction of those who served in it, but the proportion was higher than in the regular British Army, the RUC and the civilian population.

Initially, the Army allowed soldiers to be members of the UDA. Despite its involvement in terrorism, the UDA was not outlawed by the British Government until 1992. In July 1972, Harry Tuzo (the Army's General officer commanding in Northern Ireland) devised a strategy to defeat the IRA, which was backed by Michael Carver, head of the British Army. It proposed that the growth of the UDA "should be discreetly encouraged in Protestant areas, to reduce the load on the Security Forces", and suggested they "turn a blind eye to UDA arms when confined to their own areas". That summer, the Army mounted some joint patrols with the UDA in Protestant areas, following talks between General Robert Ford and UDA leader Tommy Herron. In November 1972 the Army ordered that a soldier should be discharged if his sympathy for a paramilitary group affects his performance, loyalty or impartiality. Within three years, 171 soldiers with UDA links had been discharged.

In 1977, the Army investigated 10th Battalion, Ulster Defence Regiment based at Girdwood Barracks, Belfast. The investigation found that 70 soldiers had links to the Ulster Volunteer Force (UVF), that thirty soldiers had fraudulently diverted up to £47,000 to the UVF, and that UVF members socialized with soldiers in their mess. Following this, two soldiers were dismissed on security grounds. The investigation was halted after a senior officer claimed it was harming morale. Details of it were uncovered in 2011.

During the 1970s, the Glenanne gang—a secret alliance of loyalist militants, British soldiers and RUC officers—carried out a string of attacks against Catholics in an area of Northern Ireland known as the "murder triangle". It also carried out some attacks in the Republic. Lethal Allies: British Collusion in Ireland claims the group killed about 120 people, almost all of whom were reportedly uninvolved Catholic civilians. The Cassel Report investigated 76 murders attributed to the group and found evidence that soldiers and policemen were involved in 74 of those. One member, RUC officer John Weir, claimed his superiors knew of the collusion but allowed it to continue. The Cassel Report also said some senior officers knew of the crimes but did nothing to prevent, investigate or punish. Attacks attributed to the group include the Dublin and Monaghan bombings (1974), the Miami Showband killings (1975) and the Reavey and O'Dowd killings (1976).

The Stevens Inquiries found that elements of the British Army had used loyalists as "proxies". Through their double-agents and informers, they helped loyalist groups to kill people, including civilians. It concluded that this had intensified and prolonged the conflict. The Army's Force Research Unit (FRU) was the main agency involved. Brian Nelson, the UDA's chief 'intelligence officer', was a FRU agent. Through Nelson, FRU helped loyalists target people for assassination. FRU commanders say they helped loyalists target only republican activists and prevented the killing of civilians. The Inquiries found evidence only two lives were saved and that Nelson/FRU was responsible for at least 30 murders and many other attacks – many of them on civilians. One victim was solicitor Pat Finucane. Nelson also supervised the shipping of weapons to loyalists from South Africa in 1988. From 1992 to 1994, loyalists were responsible for more deaths than republicans, partly due to FRU. Members of the security forces tried to obstruct the Stevens investigation.

== Casualties ==
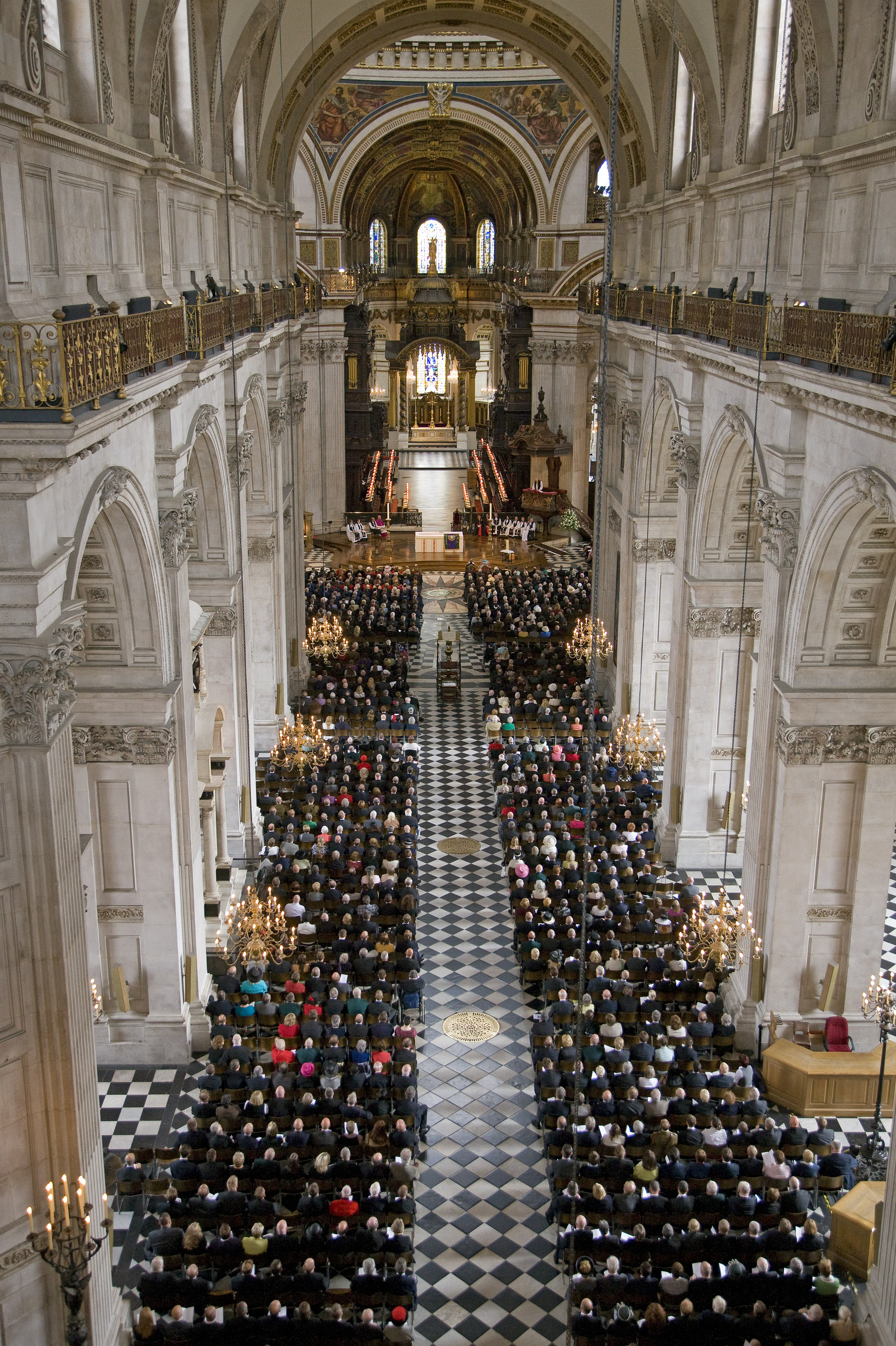
The service held in St Paul's Cathedral in 2008 to honour the British military personnel who took part in Operation Banner

According to the Ministry of Defence, 1,441 serving members of the British armed forces died in Operation Banner; 722 of whom were killed in paramilitary attacks, and 719 of whom died as a result of assault, accidents, suicide or natural causes during deployment. This includes:

- 814 from the regular British Army; 477 of whom were killed by paramilitaries, and 337 of whom died from other causes.
- 548 from the Ulster Defence Regiment/Royal Irish Regiment; 204 of whom were killed by paramilitaries, and 344 of whom died from other causes.
- 17 from the Territorial Army; 9 of whom were killed by paramilitaries, and 8 of whom died from other causes.
- 26 Royal Marines; 21 of whom were killed by paramilitaries, and 5 of whom died from other causes.
- 26 Royal Air Force servicemen; 4 of whom were killed by paramilitaries, and 22 of whom died from other causes.
- 8 Royal Navy servicemen; 5 of whom were killed by paramilitaries, and 3 of whom died from other causes.
- 2 from other branches of the Army, who were killed by paramilitaries.

A further 45 former British military personnel were killed during Operation Banner.

It was announced in July 2009 that their next of kin will be eligible to receive the Elizabeth Cross.

According to the "Sutton Index of Deaths", at the Conflict Archive on the Internet (CAIN), the British military killed 307 people (297 of whom were killed by the British Army, eight by the UDR, one by the RAF and one by the Ulster Special Constabulary) during Operation Banner.

- 156 (~51%) were civilians
- 128 (~42%) were members of republican paramilitaries, including:
  - 111 members of the Provisional Irish Republican Army
  - 11 members of the Official Irish Republican Army
  - 5 members of the Irish National Liberation Army (INLA)
  - 1 member of the Irish People's Liberation Organisation (IPLO)
- 14 (~5%) were members of loyalist paramilitaries, including:
  - 7 members of the Ulster Defence Association (UDA)
  - 7 members of the Ulster Volunteer Force (UVF)
- 6 were members of the British Army
- 2 were Royal Ulster Constabulary (RUC) officers
- 1 was a member of the Ulster Defence Regiment (UDR)

Another detailed study, Lost Lives, states that the British military killed 301 people during Operation Banner.

- 160 (~53%) were civilians
- 121 (~40%) were republican paramilitaries
- 10 (~3%) were loyalist paramilitaries
- 8 (~2%) were fellow British military personnel
- 2 were RUC officers

== Analysis of the operation ==
In July 2007, under the Freedom of Information Act 2000, the Ministry of Defence published Operation Banner: An analysis of military operations in Northern Ireland, which reflected on the Army's role in the conflict and the strategic and operational lessons drawn from their involvement. The paper divides the IRA activity and tactics into two main periods: The "insurgency" phase (1971–1972), and the "terrorist" phase (1972–1997). The British Army claims to have curbed the IRA insurgency by 1972, after Operation Motorman. The IRA then reemerged as a cell-structured organisation. The report also asserts that the government efforts by the 1980s were aimed at destroying the IRA, rather than negotiating a political solution. One of the findings of the document is the failure of the British Army to tackle the IRA at strategic level and the lack of a single campaign authority and plan. The paper stops short of claiming that "Northern Ireland has achieved a state of lasting peace" and acknowledges that, as late as 2006, there were still "areas of Northern Ireland out of bounds to soldiers".

The report analyses Israeli military theorist Martin van Creveld's comments on the outcome of the operation:

Martin van Creveld has said that the British Army is unique in Northern Ireland in its success against an irregular force. It should be recognised that the Army did not 'win' in any recognisable way; rather it achieved its desired end-state, which allowed a political process to be established without unacceptable levels of intimidation. Security force operations suppressed the level of violence to a level which the population could live with, and with which the RUC and later the PSNI could cope. The violence was reduced to an extent which made it clear to the PIRA that they would not win through violence. This is a major achievement, and one with which the security forces from all three Services, with the Army in the lead, should be entirely satisfied. It took a long time but, as van Crefeld [sic] said, that success is unique.

The US military have sought to incorporate lessons from Operation Banner in their field manual.
