= 39th G8 summit =

2013 international leader meeting in Northern Ireland

Coordinates: 54.3978°N 7.6933°W

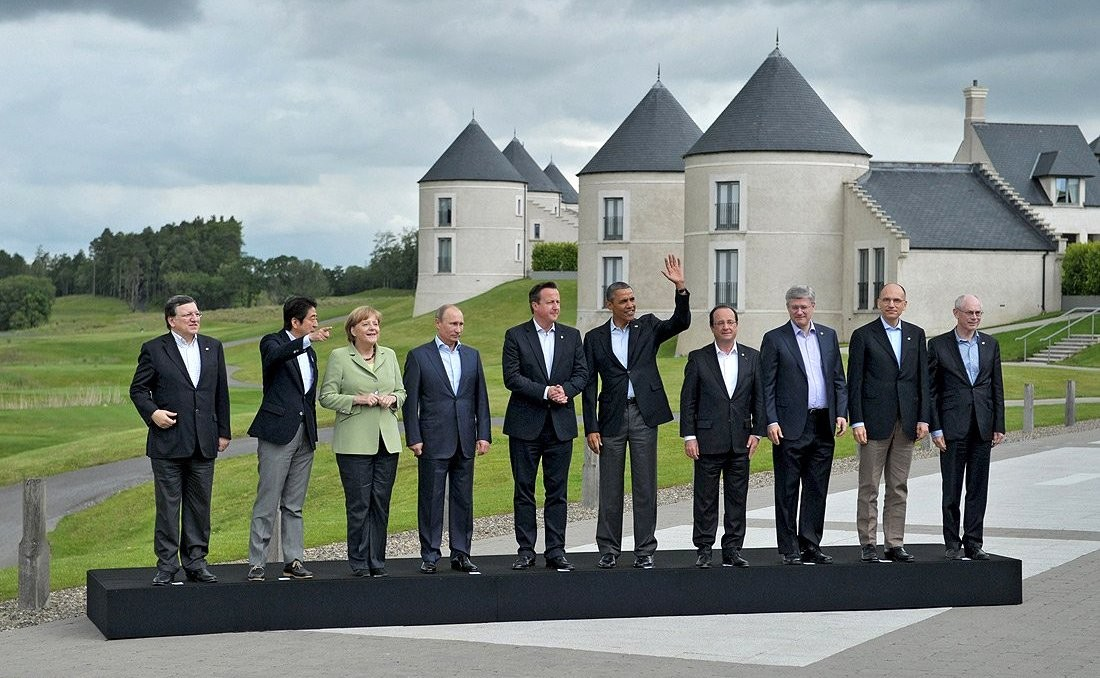
- Host country: United Kingdom
- Date: 17–18 June 2013
- Cities: Enniskillen
- Venues: Lough Erne Resort
- Follows: 38th G8 summit
- Precedes: 40th G7 summit

The 39th G8 summit was held on 17–18 June 2013, at the Lough Erne Resort, a five-star hotel and golf resort on the shore of Lough Erne in Enniskillen, County Fermanagh, Northern Ireland. It was the sixth G8 summit to be held in the United Kingdom and the first to be held in Northern Ireland. The earlier G8 summits hosted by the United Kingdom were held in London (1977, 1984, 1991), Birmingham (1998), and Auchterarder (2005).

The official theme of the summit was tax evasion and transparency. However, the Syrian civil war dominated the discussions. A seven-point plan on Syria was agreed after much debate. Other agreements included a way to automate the sharing of tax information, new rules for mining companies, and a pledge to end payments for kidnap victim releases. The United States and the European Union agreed to begin talks towards a broad trade agreement.

== Overview ==
The Group of Six (G6), started in 1975, was an unofficial forum which brought together the heads of the richest industrialized countries: France, Germany, Italy, Japan, the United Kingdom, and the United States. This select few became the Group of Seven (G7) starting in 1976 when Canada joined. The Group of Eight was formed with the addition of Russia in 1997. In addition, the President of the European Commission has been formally included in summits since 1981. The summits were not meant to be linked formally with wider international institutions; and in fact, a mild rebellion against the stiff formality of other international meetings was a part of the genesis of cooperation between France's president Valéry Giscard d'Estaing and Germany's chancellor Helmut Schmidt as they conceived the initial summit of the Group of Six in 1975.

The G8 summits during the twenty-first century have inspired widespread debates, protests and demonstrations; and the two- or three-day event becomes more than the sum of its parts, elevating the participants, the issues and the venue as focal points for activist pressure.

The current form of the G8 is being evaluated. Some reports attribute resistance to the relatively smaller powers such as the UK, Canada, and Japan, who are said to perceive a dilution of their global stature. Alternately, a larger forum for global governance may be more reflective of the present multi-polar world.

The forum is in a process of transformation by expanded membership and by other changes.

== Location and local dangers ==
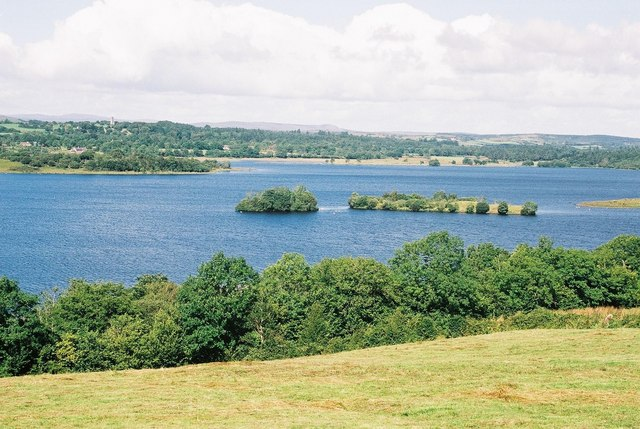
Lower Lough Erne

The date and location of the summit was announced by British Prime Minister David Cameron in November 2012. According to Mark Simpson, the BBC's Ireland Correspondent, the British government chose Fermanagh for two main reasons: history and geography. Since the formation of Northern Ireland in 1921, there has been tension and violence between its two main communities. The unionist/loyalist community (who are mostly Protestant) generally want Northern Ireland to remain within the United Kingdom, while the Irish nationalist/republican community (who are mostly Catholic) generally want it to leave the United Kingdom and join a united Ireland. From the late 1960s until the late 1990s, these two communities and the British state were involved in an ethno-nationalist conflict known as the Troubles, in which over 3,500 people were killed. A peace process led to the Belfast Agreement and ceasefires by the paramilitary groups involved (such as the republican Provisional IRA, the loyalist Ulster Volunteer Force). The Conservative Party government of David Cameron is a unionist one. By holding it in Northern Ireland, Cameron "will hope it sends the message to the rest of the world that the peace process has worked and normality has returned". The second reason is geography. G8 summits have always drawn large demonstrations, but Fermanagh's geography will make it hard for protesters. Much of the Lough Erne Resort is surrounded by water and almost all of the roads within 30 miles are single carriageway.

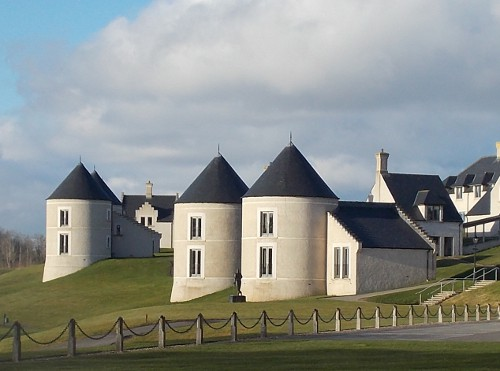
Lodges at Lough Erne Resort

Some have criticized the decision to hold the summit in Northern Ireland, due to ongoing protests and small-scale violence by both republicans and loyalists. Since the Provisional IRA called a ceasefire at the end of the Troubles, dissident republican splinter groups have continued its paramilitary campaign. The main groups involved in this low-intensity campaign are the Real IRA, the Continuity IRA, and Óglaigh na hÉireann. Security sources expected that these groups would try to launch an attack during the summit, which "would hijack global headlines".

On 23 March 2013, a car bomb was defused 16 miles (26 km) from the Lough Erne Resort. Republican group Óglaigh na hÉireann said it had planned to detonate it at the hotel but had to abort the attack.

There was also the possibility of disruption and violence involving loyalists and nationalists. The summit took place during the marching season, when Protestant and loyalist groups (such as the Orange Order) hold parades throughout Northern Ireland. This is a tense time in Northern Ireland and it often results in clashes between the two main communities. From December 2012 through to December 2013, loyalists held daily street protests against the decision to lessen the number of days the Union Jack flies from Belfast City Hall. Some of these protests sparked rioting. Protesters discussed holding a Union Jack protest at the G8 summit.

== Security preparations ==
The Police Service of Northern Ireland (PSNI) mounted a huge security operation in County Fermanagh, at Belfast International Airport (where many of the G8 leaders arrived) and in Belfast. The police operation involved about 8,000 officers: 4,500 from the PSNI and 3,500 who were drafted in from other parts of the UK. They were also trained in PSNI riot tactics and to drive its armoured vehicles. The Lough Erne Resort was surrounded by a four-mile long metal fence and razor wire. Lower Lough Erne was made off-limits to the general public and an air corridor between Belfast and the Resort was made a no-fly zone during the summit. British Army Chinook and Merlin helicopters were used to escort political leaders and their entourages to and from the Resort. The PSNI also bought surveillance drones to help police the summit, while in Belfast, landmark buildings were guarded round-the-clock.

The PSNI said it would "uphold the right to peaceful protest" but that there were to be "consequences" for any protesters who broke the law. More than 100 cells at Northern Ireland's high-security prison, Maghaberry, were set aside for any violent protesters and a temporary cell block was built in Omagh. Anyone arrested during protests at or near the resort were taken to the Omagh holding centre to be questioned and held before going to court. Sixteen judges were put on standby to preside over special court sittings. PSNI superintendent Paula Hilman said "We will be able to have a detained person processed, interviewed if required, charged, and appear before the court in a very short time, in a matter of hours". Some protest groups feared that the PSNI would use the dissident republican threat as an excuse for repressive measures against protesters. The Committee on the Administration of Justice (CAJ) planned to send human rights observers to monitor the PSNI. CAJ deputy director Daniel Holder said his organization was "firmly and absolutely opposed to the use of plastic bullets", which he said had been fired on 12 occasions in Northern Ireland over the past year.

In the Republic of Ireland, almost 1,000 officers from the Garda Síochána mounted a security operation along the border. Eight temporary border checkpoints were guarded by Garda units backed up by the Irish Army. The Garda's elite tactical team, the Emergency Response Unit (ERU), and the special operations forces from the Defence Forces, the Army Ranger Wing (ARW), were deployed on land and water to secure the border from unauthorised crossings. Some of the delegations attending the summit stayed in the Republic, and protesters announced their intention to hold demonstrations in Dublin. Like in Northern Ireland, a special court had also been set up in the Republic to deal with protesters who were arrested there. The court operated day and night at Cloverhill Prison in Dublin. Suspects remanded in custody would then be moved through a tunnel from the courthouse to the adjoining jail. Meanwhile, American warships were deployed off the coast of County Donegal and in the Irish Sea as security measures.

The cost of the summit was expected to be about £60 million. The Northern Ireland government paid £6 million and the British government paid for the rest.

== Leaders at the summit ==
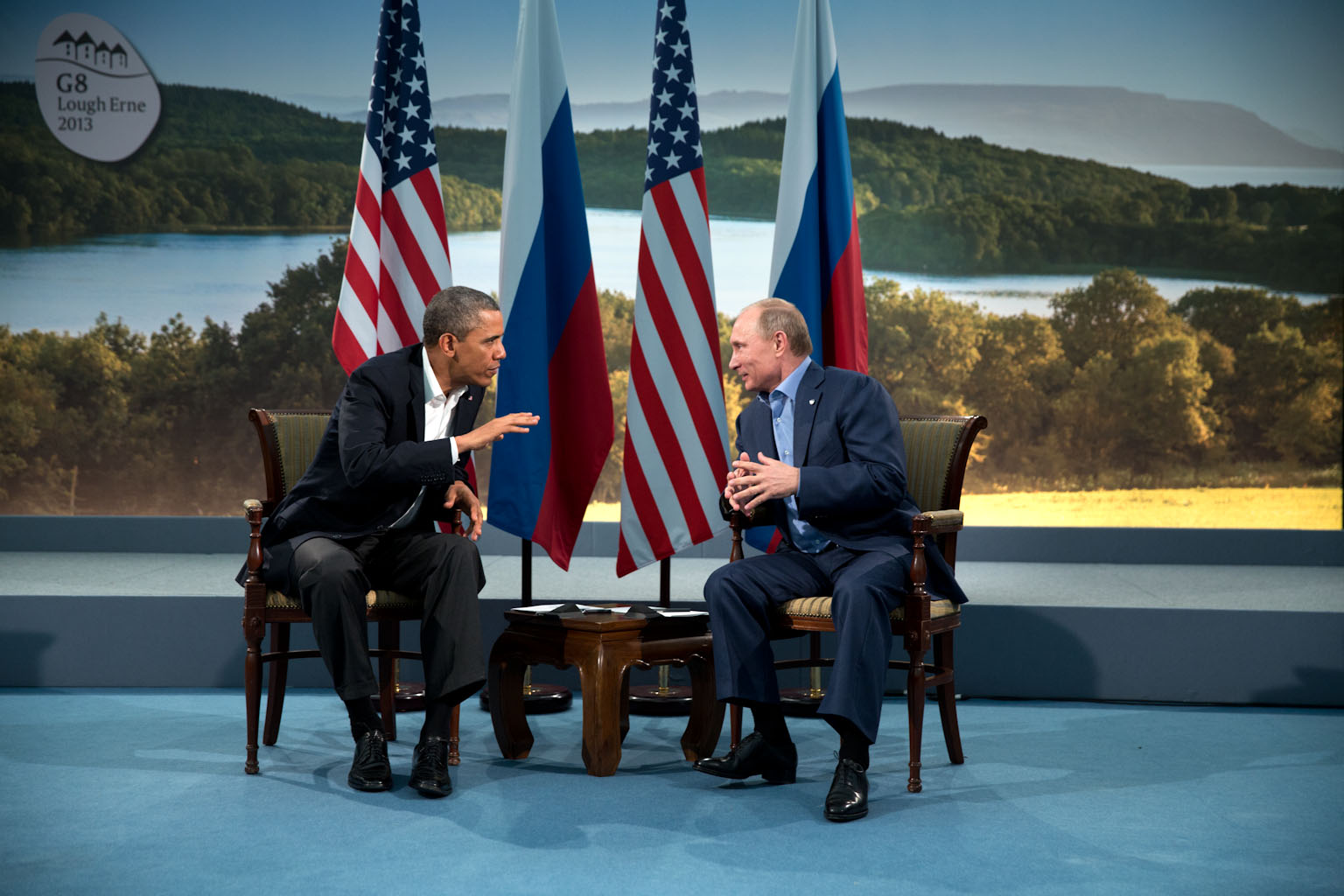
US President Barack Obama with Russian President Vladimir Putin at the summit

The attendees included the leaders of the eight G8 member states, as well as representatives of the European Union. A number of national leaders, and heads of international organizations, are traditionally invited to attend the summit and to participate in some, but not all, G8 summit activities.

The 39th G8 summit was the first and only summit for Italian Prime Minister Enrico Letta. It was also the last summit for Russian President Vladimir Putin and Russia overall.

=== Participants ===
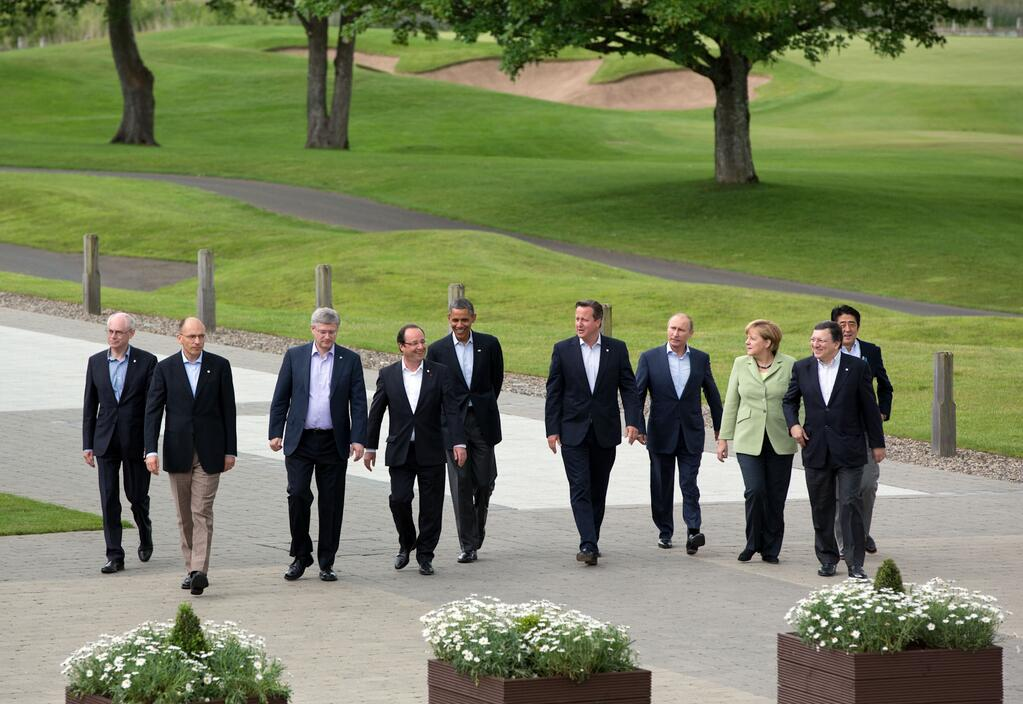
G8 leaders in Lough Erne

**Core G8 members** Host state and leader are shown in bold text.
Member		Represented by	Title
(Canada)	Canada	Stephen Harper	Prime Minister
(France)	France	François Hollande	President
(Germany)	Germany	Angela Merkel	Chancellor
(Italy)	Italy	Enrico Letta	Prime Minister
(Japan)	Japan	Shinzō Abe	Prime Minister
(Russia)	Russia	Vladimir Putin	President
(United Kingdom)	**United Kingdom**	**David Cameron**	**Prime Minister**
(United States)	United States	Barack Obama	President
(European Union)	European Union	José Manuel Barroso	Commission President
(European Union)	European Union	Herman Van Rompuy	Council President
**Guest Invitees (Countries)**
Member		Represented by	Title
(Republic of Ireland)	Ireland (Note: Ireland had been the current chair (January–June 2013) of the rotating EU Presidency, and its leader was invited for talks on the sidelines of the summit about a US–EU trade deal.)	Enda Kenny	Taoiseach

== Agenda ==
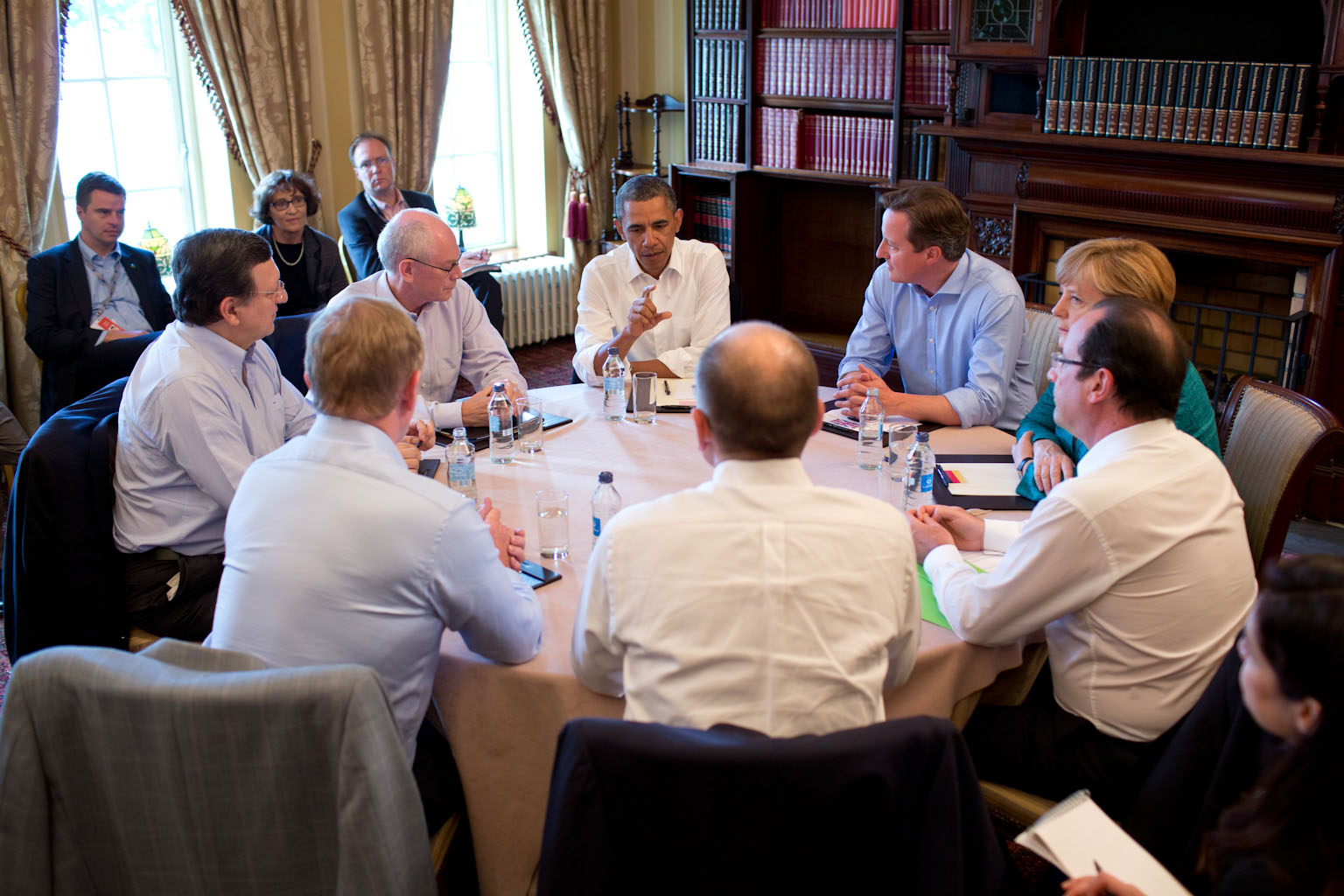
Transatlantic Trade and Investment Partnership meeting at the G8 summit on 17 June 2013

Officially, tax evasion and transparency were the themes of the summit. However, the Syrian civil war dominated the agenda. According to Cameron, it was also the most difficult issue addressed. A declaration signed by the eight nations outlines a seven-point plan for Syria. It calls for more humanitarian aid, "[maximizing] diplomatic pressure" aiming for peace talks, backing a transitional government, "[learning] the lessons of Iraq" by maintaining Syria public institutions, ridding the country of terrorists, condemning the use of chemical weapons "by anyone", and instilling a new non-sectarian government. They called for UN investigations into the use of chemical weapons with the promise that whoever had used them would be punished. Although Syrian President Bashar al-Assad was not mentioned by name in the declaration, Cameron said it was "unthinkable" that he would remain in power.

Agreements were also reached on global tax evasion and data sharing. The G8 nations agreed to tight rules on corporate tax that sometimes allow companies to shift income from one nation to another to avoid taxes. They agreed that shell companies should have to disclose their true owners, and that it should be easy for any G8 nation to obtain this information. Going forward, corporate and individual tax information will be shared automatically to help detect tax fraud and evasion. The Organisation for Economic Co-operation and Development was assigned to gather data on how multinationals evade taxes.

The G8 nations agreed that oil, gas, and mining companies should report payments from the government, and likewise that the government should report the resources they obtain. The measure was aimed at helping developing countries collect taxes from first-world companies operating in their territories. A declaration to stop paying ransom demands for kidnap victims was also signed.

During the summit the United States and the European Union announced they would enter into trade deal negotiations. Canadian Prime Minister Stephen Harper said the EU and Canada were close to wrapping up a similar deal after years of negotiations which should not be affected by the US-EU announcement.

Harper and Obama also had an informal meeting to discuss border relations during the summit. Harper said they discussed "a range of Canada-US issues that you would expect, obviously the Keystone Pipeline."

== Gallery of participating leaders ==
=== Core G8 participants ===
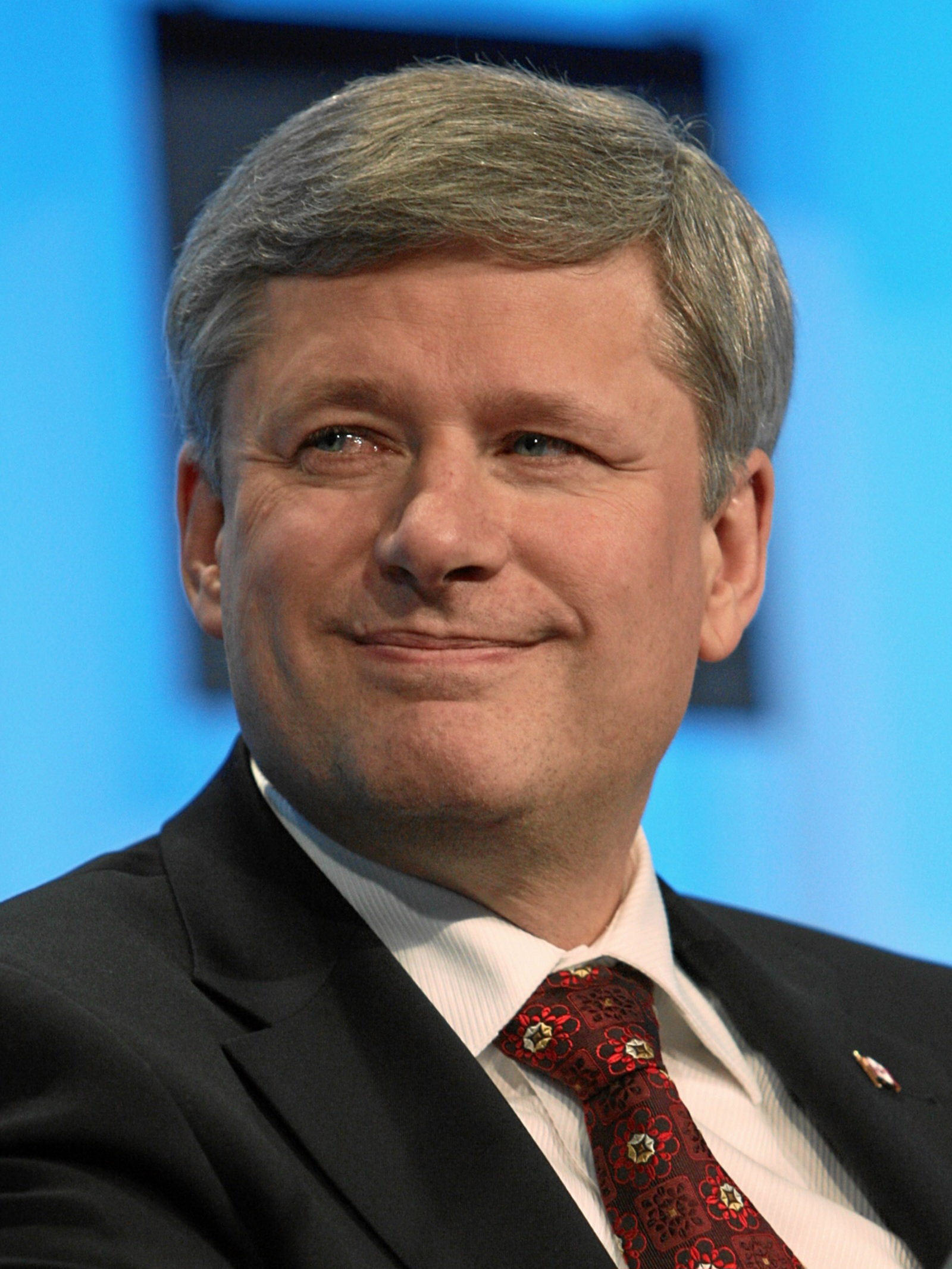
(Canada) Canada
Stephen Harper,
Prime Minister

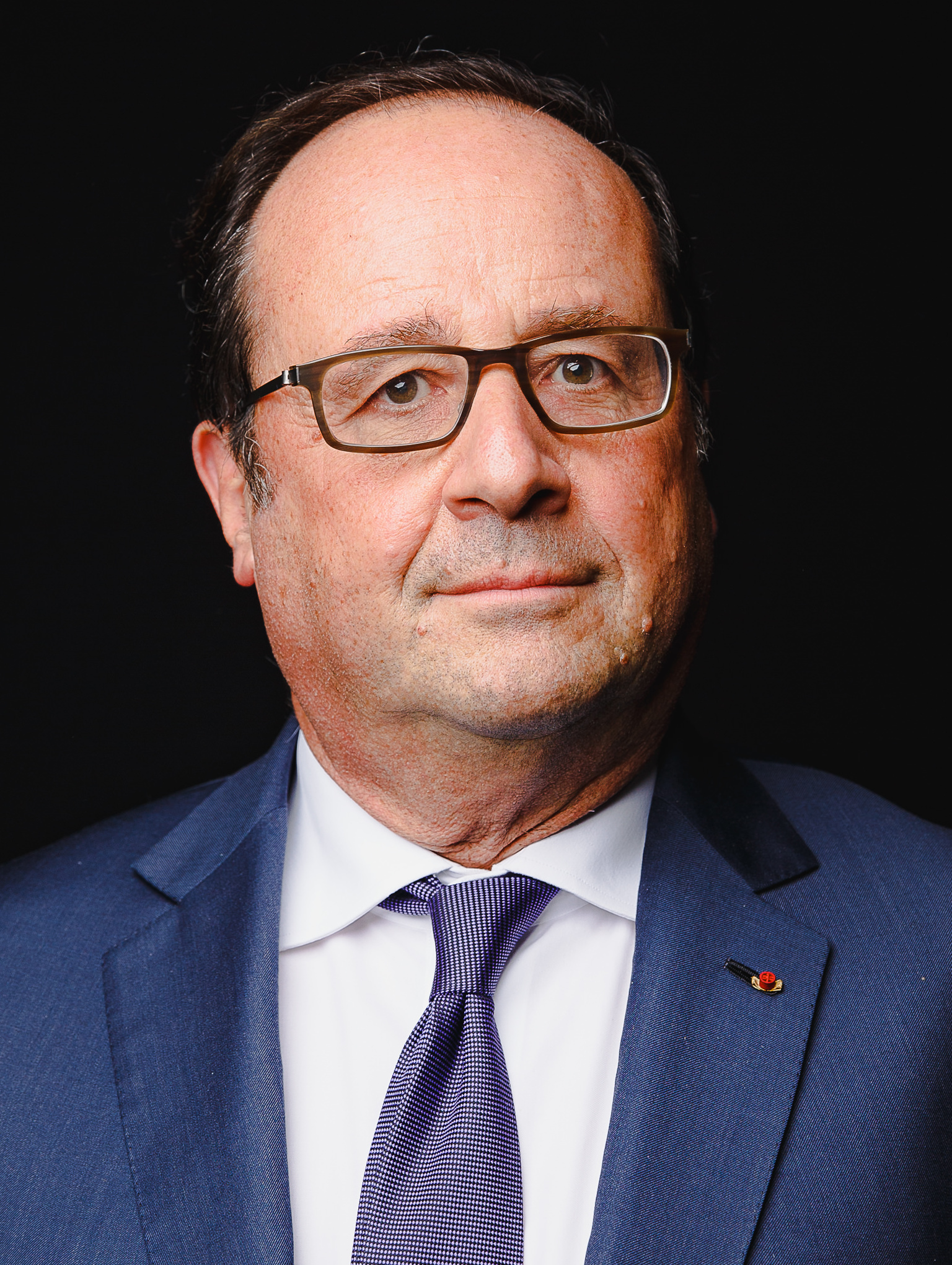
(France) France
François Hollande,
President

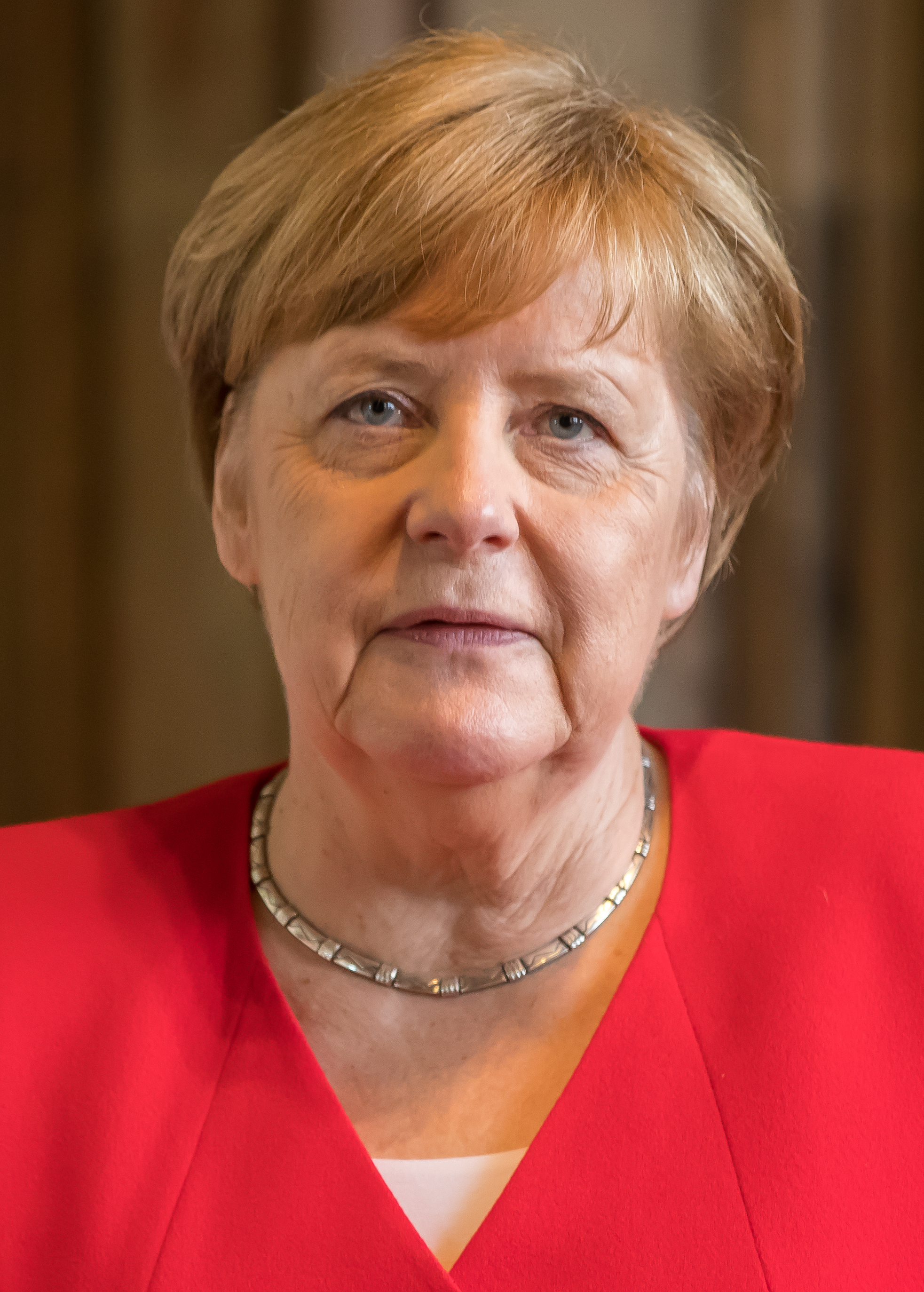
(Germany) Germany
Angela Merkel,
Chancellor

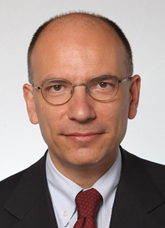
(Italy) Italy
Enrico Letta,
Prime Minister

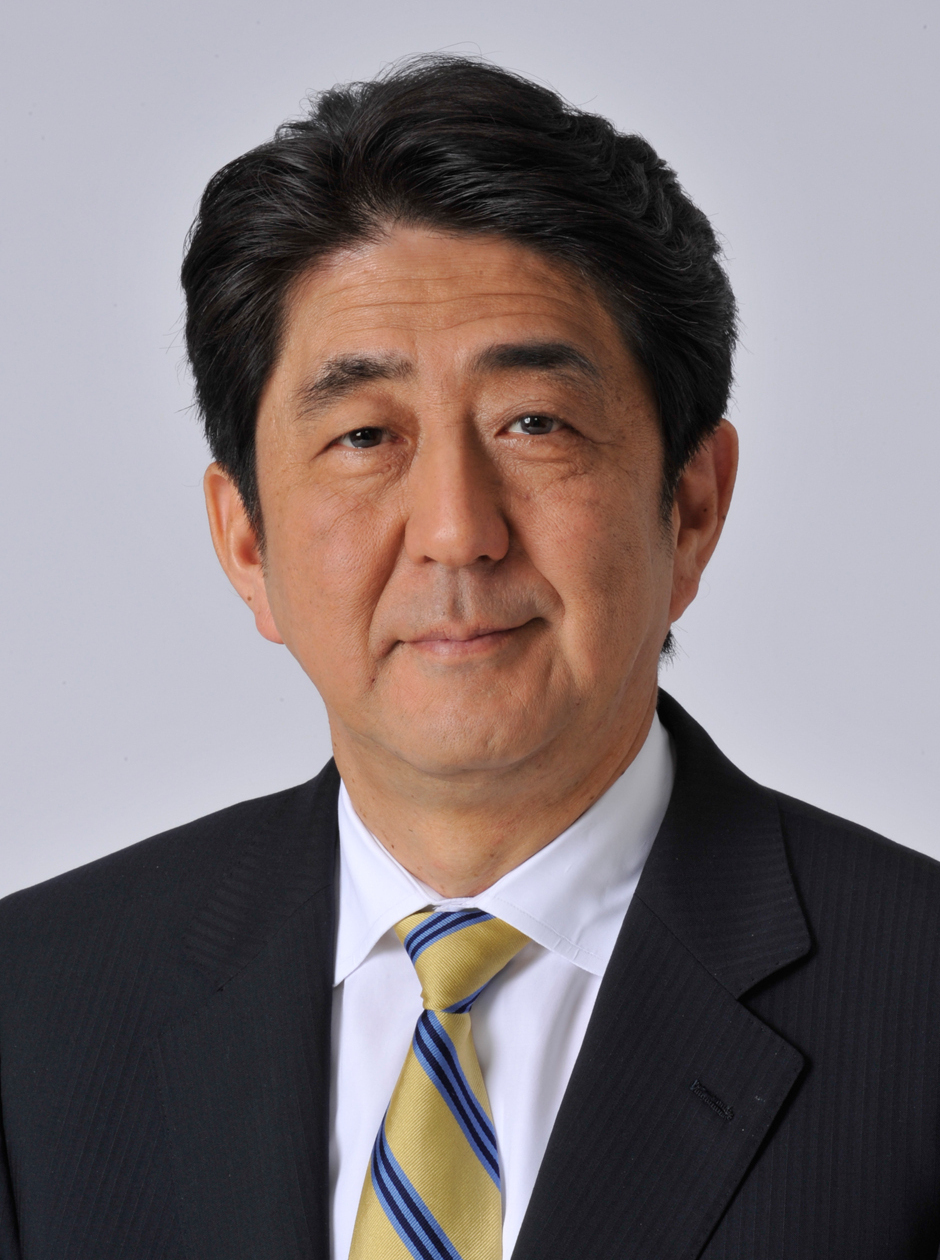
(Japan) Japan
Shinzō Abe,
Prime Minister

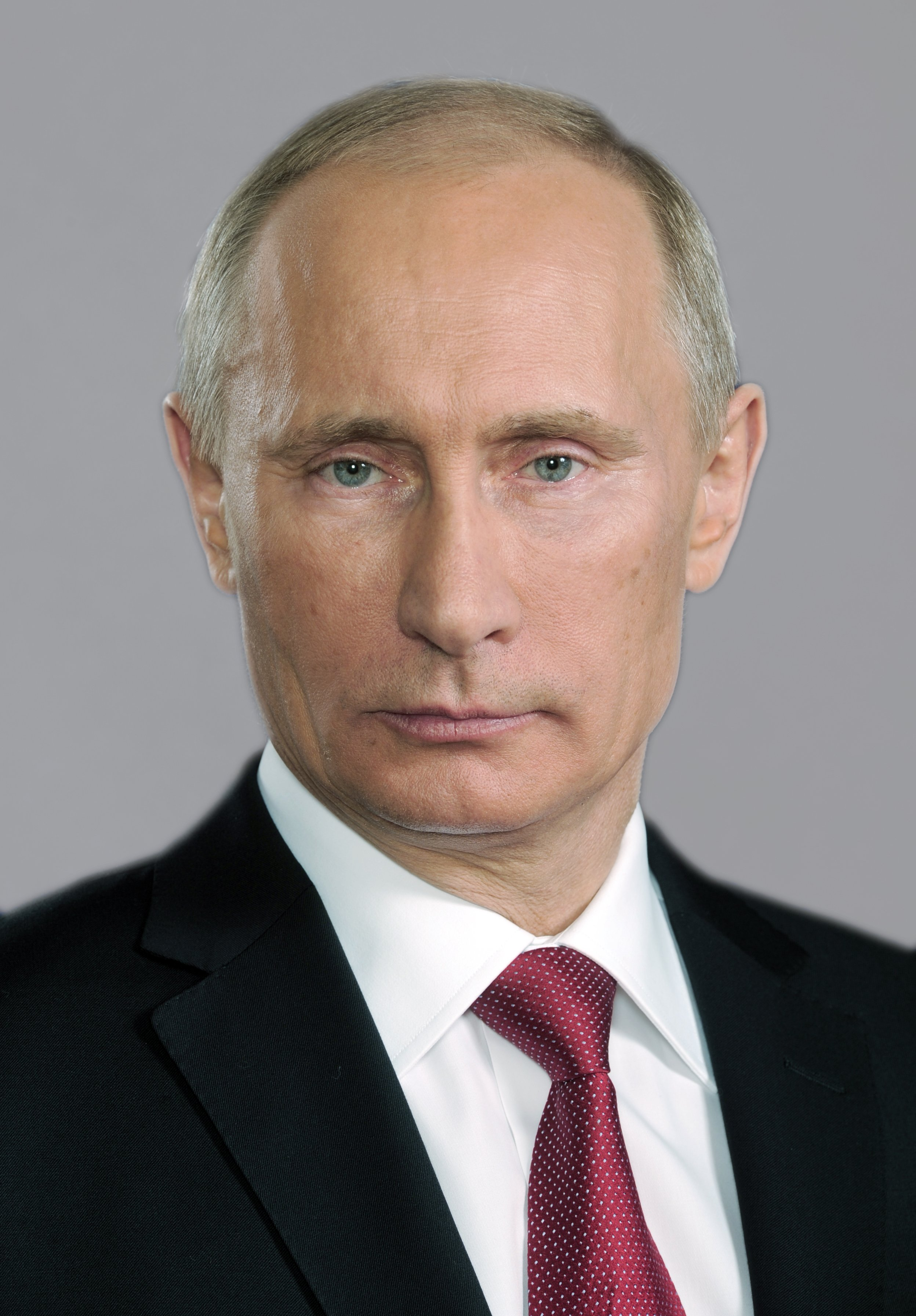
(Russia) Russia
Vladimir Putin,
President

(United Kingdom) United Kingdom
David Cameron,
Prime Minister (Host)

(United States) United States
Barack Obama,
President
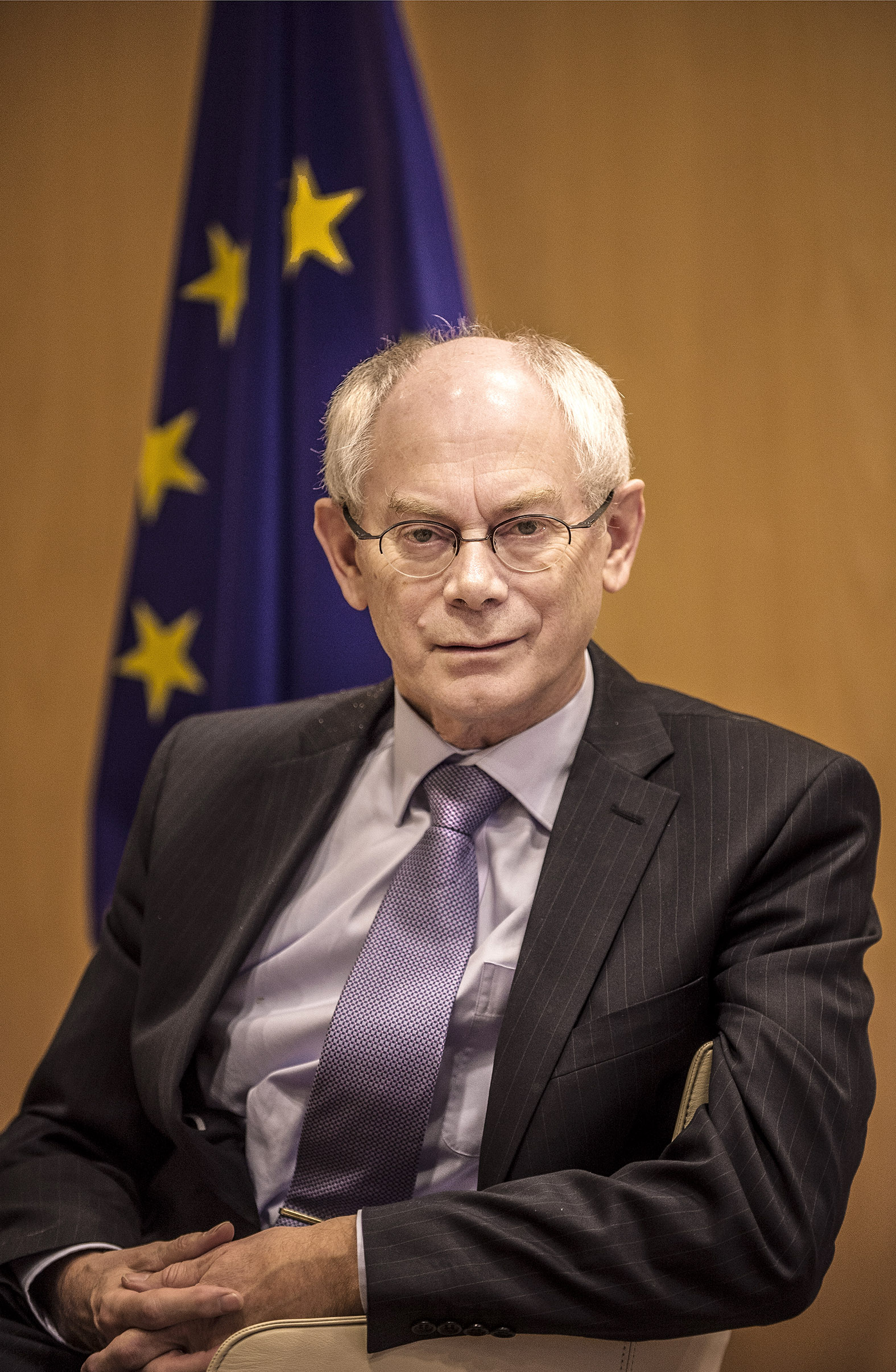
(European Union) European Union
Herman Van Rompuy,
Council President

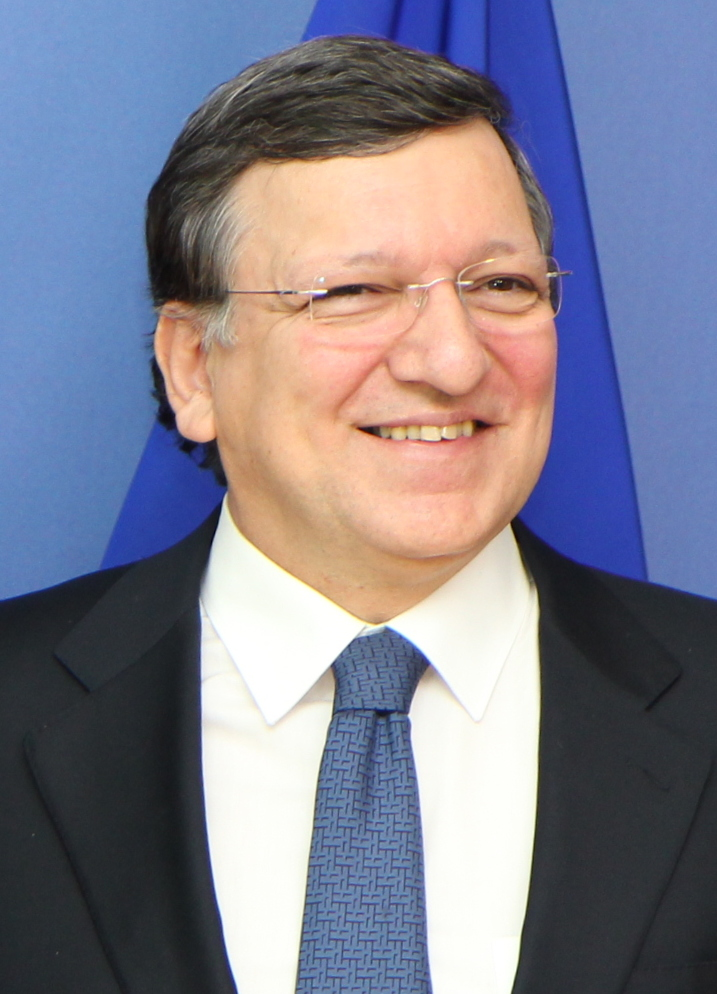
(European Union) European Union
José Manuel Barroso,
Commission President

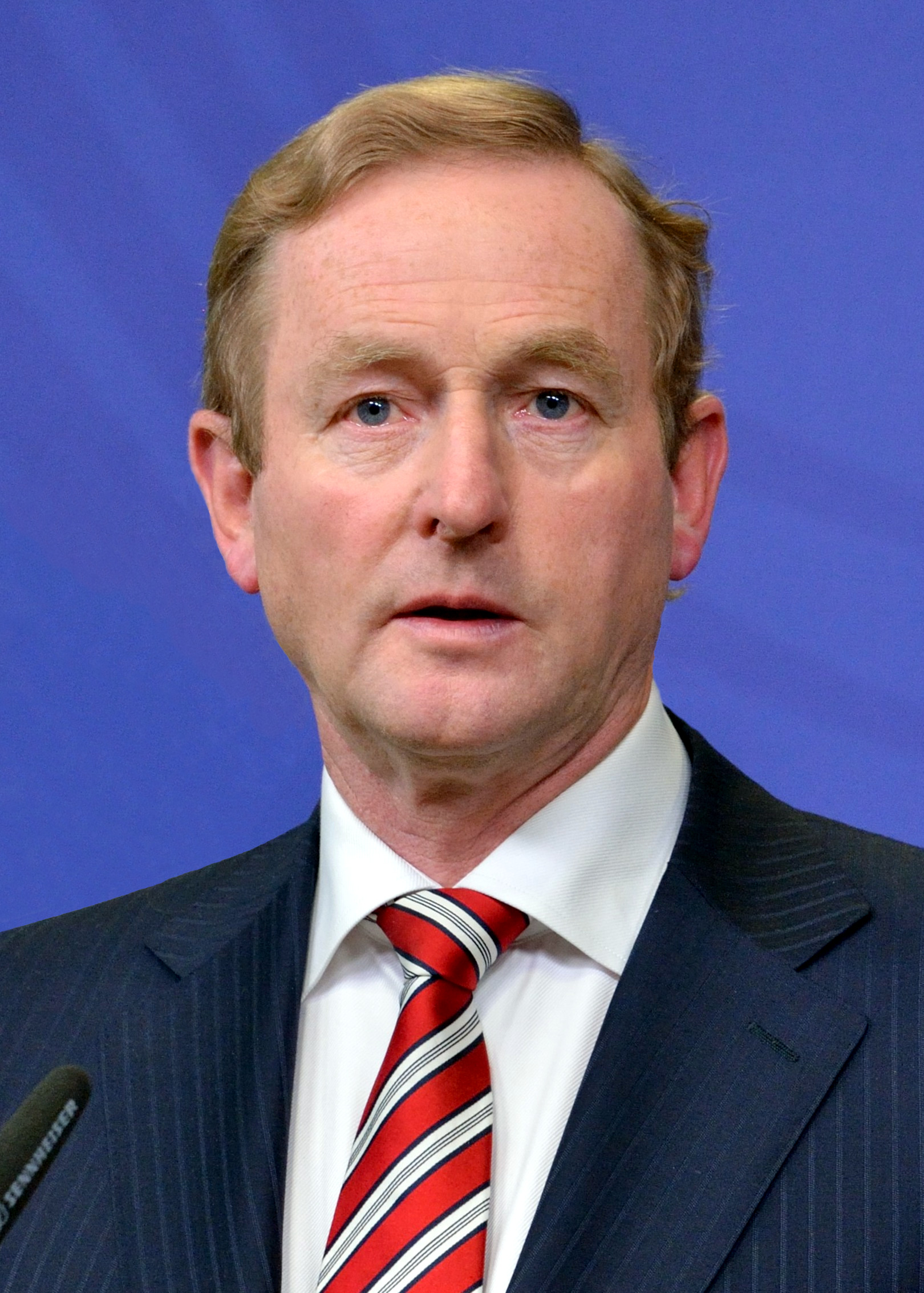
(Republic of Ireland) Ireland
(European Union) European Union
Invited leader
Enda Kenny,
Taoiseach, and current chair of the rotating EU Presidency

== See also ==
- List of G8 summits
- List of G20 summits
