= 2010 Newry car bombing =

Terrorist incident in Northern Ireland

Coordinates: 54.1797°N 6.3351°W

- Part of the dissident Irish republican campaign
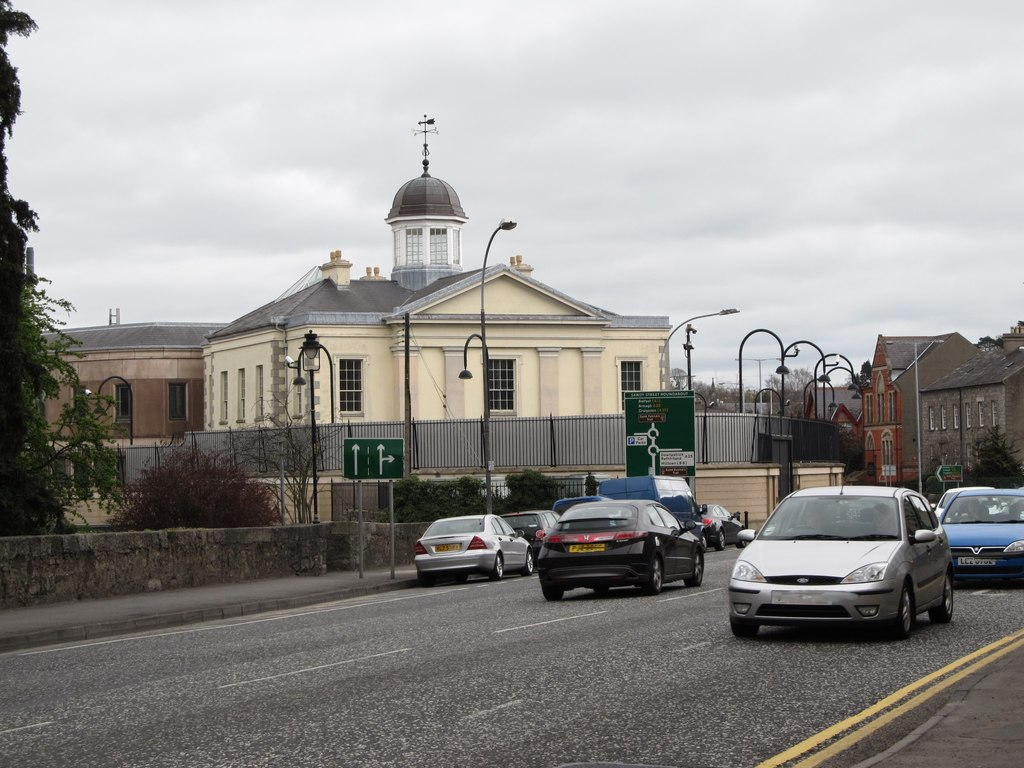
- Newry Courthouse in 2012
- Location: Newry, County Down, Northern Ireland, United Kingdom
- Date: 22 February 2010; 20:53 (UTC)
- Attack type: Car bomb
- Deaths: 0
- Injuries: 0

The 2010 Newry car bombing occurred on the night of 22 February 2010. It exploded outside a courthouse in Newry, County Down, Northern Ireland, damaging the building and others in the area. There were no fatalities or injuries.

== Bombing ==
The car bombing happened on the evening of 22 February 2010. Seventeen minutes before it exploded, a telephone warning was received saying it was in the centre of Newry and would go off in half an hour. The police evacuated people from their homes and the town centre. The car was a Mazda 6 loaded with 115 kg of explosives. The car exploded next to the gates of the courthouse. The bomb was felt and heard from two miles away. The blast damaged the courthouse and other buildings in the area. A 170-year-old church had its windows blown out; three people were inside the church when the bomb exploded, but they were uninjured. The bombers phoned in a warning that police should clear the area because a bomb would go off in 30 minutes, in fact it went off in 17 minutes. Because of the size of the bomb, the police termed it a "sheer miracle" that no one was injured.

According to the BBC, it is thought that this was the first "large car bomb" to have exploded in Northern Ireland since the 2000 bombing of the Stewartstown police station. Other car bombs have failed to explode, or have only partially exploded.

The bombing is thought to have been an attempt to undo the 2010 Hillsborough Castle Agreement, although the fact that it came two weeks after the Agreement was signed is thought to reflect the militants' limited operational capacity.

According to Fachtna Murphy, Commissioner of the Garda Síochána, this was "the first bomb that exploded in the North in 10 or 11 years."

A warning call was made prior to the explosion, no one was hurt in the attack, several buildings were damaged, and arrests were made, including that of a man suspected of driving the taxi used to transport the bomb. Local residents and politicians expressed shock and anger over the attack.

== Aftermath ==
The next day the area was sealed off as police investigated. Shops were closed and traffic backed up on the motorway between Newry and Belfast. The large explosion caused "traffic chaos" across the city.

The church was reopened in February 2011, after £350,000 of repairs and restoration.

== Arrests ==
The Real Irish Republican Army was blamed for the bombing in Newry. On 27 May, a 32-year-old man was arrested for the bombing. A day before that a 51-year-old man appeared in the same court charged with the car bombing.

A 45-year-old man was jailed in 2017 for being a member of the IRA, because of DNA evidence he left on the car bomb.

== Responses and impact ==
Hillary Clinton, the United States Secretary of State, condemned the bombing but insisted that it would "not destabilise the peace process".

The Newry car bombing is taken as evidence that "hardline Republicans" continue to have the ability to carry out terror attacks in Northern Ireland, although they no longer have the operational strength to do so in Britain itself. The Newry car bombing was one of several cross-border attacks into Northern Ireland in 2009–10. Others included a car bombing of the Northern Ireland Policing Board.

The operational strength of dissident republican groups as demonstrated by this bombing continues to concern Irish security forces as of September 2010. According to Garda Commissioner Fachtna Murphy, "A bomb exploded in Newry some months ago and that's the first bomb that exploded in the North since Omagh. That is significant in itself in that it tells us they are endeavouring to improve their capability all the time."

Politically, the attack was alleged by the Belfast Telegraph to have led some loyalists "to believe the older leadership called it wrong—that they decommissioned far too soon."

Writing in the Boston Globe, Kevin Cullen cited the Newry court bombing as evidence not only of the continued existence of an "irredentist rump", but of the continuation of a social situation in which the two groups are still "bitterly divided" and "deeply segregated."

== See also ==
- Timeline of Real Irish Republican Army actions
- Timeline of the Northern Ireland Troubles and peace process
- List of bombings during the Northern Ireland Troubles
