= Arm na Poblachta =

Irish-republican paramilitary group

Arm na Poblachta (ANP) (meaning in English "Army of the Republic") is the name of a small, dissident, Irish-republican paramilitary group believed to have been founded in 2017.

== History ==
This militant group known as the ANP, emerged in 2017 by claiming responsibility for planting an improvised explosive device on Pantridge Road in Belfast. They claimed responsibility for a rocket reportedly found in the Poleglass area of Belfast following a telephone warning, PSNI have claimed they found a form of ‘explosively formed projectile’ (EFP) designed to be used against armored vehicles. It is also believed that Arm na Poblachta were responsible for the 2018 shooting death of Antrim resident Raymond Johnston. They are reportedly a "mixture gang" of ex-Provisional IRA, Continuity IRA and Oghlaigh na hEireann members.

In 2021, it claimed to have left a roadside device in the ‘Ballyarnett Road’ area of Derry. On 12 March 2022, Arm na Poblachta had hijacked a delivery driver's car and left it around the junction at Feeny Road and Killunaght Road, near Dungiven, County Londonderry, a bomb that targeted a PSNI vehicle but did not explode.

The night of 17 November 2022, an explosive device was thrown to a police car in the town of Strabane and it exploded without the officers in the car being hurt. Strabane resident Teresa Breslin, whose twin brother Charlie was killed by the SAS in an anti-IRA operation in the town, called the bomb attack "a bloody disgrace", calling it "something we never thought we’d go through again".

Ιn February 2023, Arm na Poblachta claimed responsibility for planting an explosive device in the Corrody Road area of Derry, which resulted in a security alert in the area.

In March 2023, the group issued threats against the families of Police Service of Northern Ireland (PSNI) officers. The threats were condemned by the SDLP member of the Legislative Assembly and Northern Ireland Policing Board member Mark H. Durkan. One former police officer reportedly said that the threats made by the ANP could deter young PSNI recruits from staying in the force or joining. The same month, Northern Ireland Secretary Chris Heaton-Harris announced a raise in the terrorism threat level assessment from "substantial" to "severe" for Northern Ireland, a level indicating that an attack is "highly likely," which reverses a 12-year old downward trend. Also in March 2023, three men were jailed over a "savage group attack" in West Belfast which was linked to the ANP. This claim was based on the fact that a "Join ANP" graffiti stencil was found in a premises associated with one of the arrested men. The attack had taken place in 2018.

In November 2023, the ANP were blamed for a bomb hoax alert in Derry.

According to an article in the Sunday World newspaper, as of April 2023, unnamed sources claimed that the ANP were "desperate" to kill someone, in order to prove that they are "not the Mickey Mouse outfit they have been labelled". The same article referred to the "Óglaigh na hÉireann" Real IRA splinter group (ONH) suggested that "[t]ensions between ONH and ANP have been mounting".

In February 2024, ANP claimed that they had targeted two PSNI vehicles in Derry. Two viable devices were later found.
