= Operation Helvetic =

Date	31 July 2007 – present
Location	Northern Ireland

Belligerents
Police Service of Northern Ireland; British Armed Forces	Irish republican dissidents	Ulster loyalist paramilitaries

Operation Helvetic is the operational name for the British Armed Forces' residual operation in Northern Ireland from July 2007 to the present day.

== Background ==
It was the successor operation to Operation Banner after the end of The Troubles. It consists primarily of support from Ammunition technical officers for the Police Service of Northern Ireland against an ongoing threat of bomb attacks from republican and loyalist dissidents. The operation is also intended to provide military support to the PSNI in the event of serious public disorder or an environmental crisis.

At the start of the operation the total British army strength was approximately 5,000 soldiers in ten locations. By 2018, this had reduced to around 1,300 troops only for training purposes. Thus far two British soldiers have been killed by republican paramilitaries during the operation, both killed in the 2009 Massereene Barracks shooting.

In 2016, ATOs serving as part of Operation Helvetic dealt with terrorist bomb alerts roughly once a week. Of these 49% were classified as "serious threats". The lack of a General Service Medal for ATOs serving as part of Operation Helvetic was the subject of controversy in 2017 following the rejection by the cabinet office of a request for the award of the GSM to ATOs from Andrew Rowe, Northern Ireland's most senior army officer.

In 2018, the operation was the subject of a freedom of information request brought by the Committee on the Administration of Justice, which was seeking the disclosure of the terms of reference for Operation Helvetic. The request was opposed by the UK ministry of defence on grounds of operational secrecy. Though the Information Commissioner's Office found against the MoD, the MoD plans to appeal the decision.

The cost of Operation Helvetic was approximately £1 billion a year in 2019. By 2019, increasing numbers of specialist troops were being deployed as part of the operation due to an uptick in the activity of Republican dissidents.
