= Northern Ireland Policing Board =

Police Authority in Northern Ireland

- Formation: 4 November 2001
- Headquarters: James House Block D 2-4 Cromac Avenue; The Gasworks; Belfast BT7 2JA
- Staff: 50 (2023/24)
- Website: nipolicingboard.org.uk

The Northern Ireland Policing Board (Irish: Bord Póilíneachta Thuaisceart Éireann, Ulster-Scots: Norlin Airlan Polisin Boord) is the police authority for Northern Ireland, charged with supervising the activities of the Police Service of Northern Ireland (PSNI). It is a non-departmental public body composed of members of the Northern Ireland Assembly and independent citizens who are appointed by the Minister of Justice using the Nolan principles for public appointments.

== History ==
The board is not the first police oversight body in the history of Northern Ireland. It was established on 4 November 2001 pursuant to the Police (Northern Ireland) Act 2000, as the direct successor of the Police Authority for Northern Ireland, which oversaw the Royal Ulster Constabulary. Appointments were made by the Secretary of State for Northern Ireland prior to the devolution of policing and justice.

When the Assembly was suspended in October 2002, the first board's members were re-appointed as independents by the Secretary of State to enable it to continue its work (despite most being political representatives). The Policing Board was reconstituted on 1 April 2006, 22 May 2007 and again on 24 May 2011.

The third reconstitution of the board in 2007 was historic as Sinn Féin took up its seats on the Policing Board following the party's decision to support 'civic policing' by the PSNI at its ardfheis on 28 January 2007. Sinn Féin was associated in the past with the Provisional Irish Republican Army (PIRA), which killed 271 Royal Ulster Constabulary officers and 12 police officers outside Northern Ireland during the Troubles, and had refused to recognise the legal authority of the RUC or PSNI until that point.

On 7 February 2008, the Policing Board decided to appoint a panel of independent experts to re-review the police investigation of the Omagh bombing. Some of the relatives of the bombing victims criticised the decision, saying that an international public inquiry covering both the Republic of Ireland and Northern Ireland should be established instead. The review was to determine whether enough evidence existed for further prosecutions. It would also investigate the possible perjury of two police witnesses made during the trial of suspect Sean Hoey. Sinn Féin Policing Board member Alex Maskey stated that his party fully supported the families' right to call for a "full cross-border independent inquiry" while the Policing Board had a "clear and legal obligation to scrutinise the police handling of the investigations." He also stated: "We recognise that the board has a major responsibility in carrying out our duty in holding the PSNI to account in the interests of justice for the Omagh families."

On 22 November 2009, a 400lb car bomb was driven to the Policing Board building in Belfast. It partially exploded but no one was hurt. Republican dissidents tried to ambush policemen on the same day. The incident was one of several cross-border attacks carried out by hardline republicans in 2009–2010; others included the 2010 Newry car bombing.

== Composition ==
According to the department, the appointment of all independent members is made on merit and political activity plays no part in the selection process. However, the Commissioner for Public Appointments for Northern Ireland requires that the political activity of appointees be published, for accountability.

The practice of appointing 'independent' members, who were also full members of political parties, was also common across the district policing partnerships organised by the Policing Board, thus reducing the number of places available for members of the public with no political connections.

=== Current members ===
Democratic Unionist Party

- Keith Buchanan MLA
- Cheryl Brownlee MLA
- Trevor Clarke MLA

Sinn Féin

- Gerry Kelly MLA
- Linda Dillon MLA
- Cathal Boylan MLA

Alliance Party of Northern Ireland

- Peter McReynolds MLA
- Nuala McAllister MLA

Ulster Unionist Party

- Alan Chambers MLA

Social Democratic and Labour Party

- Mark H. Durkan MLA

Independent

- Marian Cree
- Patrick Nelson
- Les Allamby
- Tommy O'Reilly
- Dr Kate Laverty
- Frank McManus
- Brendan Mullan (Vice Chair)
- Peter Osborne
- Mukesh Sharma (chair)

== See also ==
- List of Government departments and agencies in Northern Ireland
