= Committee on the Administration of Justice =

Human rights organisation in Northern Ireland

The Committee on the Administration of Justice (often known by the acronym CAJ) is an independent human rights organisation in Northern Ireland with cross-community membership. It was established in 1981 and lobbies and campaigns on a broad range of domestic and international human rights issues. CAJ seeks to secure the highest standards in the administration of justice in Northern Ireland by ensuring that the Government complies with the rule of law and with all its obligations in international human rights law.

CAJ is an affiliate member of the leading global network of human rights NGOs, the International Federation of Human Rights (FIDH), along with Liberty in Britain and the Free Legal Advice Centres (FLAC) and Irish Council for Civil Liberties (ICCL) in the Republic of Ireland.

In 1998, CAJ was awarded the Council of Europe's Human Rights Prize.

CAJ's website contains details of all of its publications and consultation submissions since 1981, and information on membership.
