= Jeffrey Donaldson =

Northern Irish politician (born 1962)

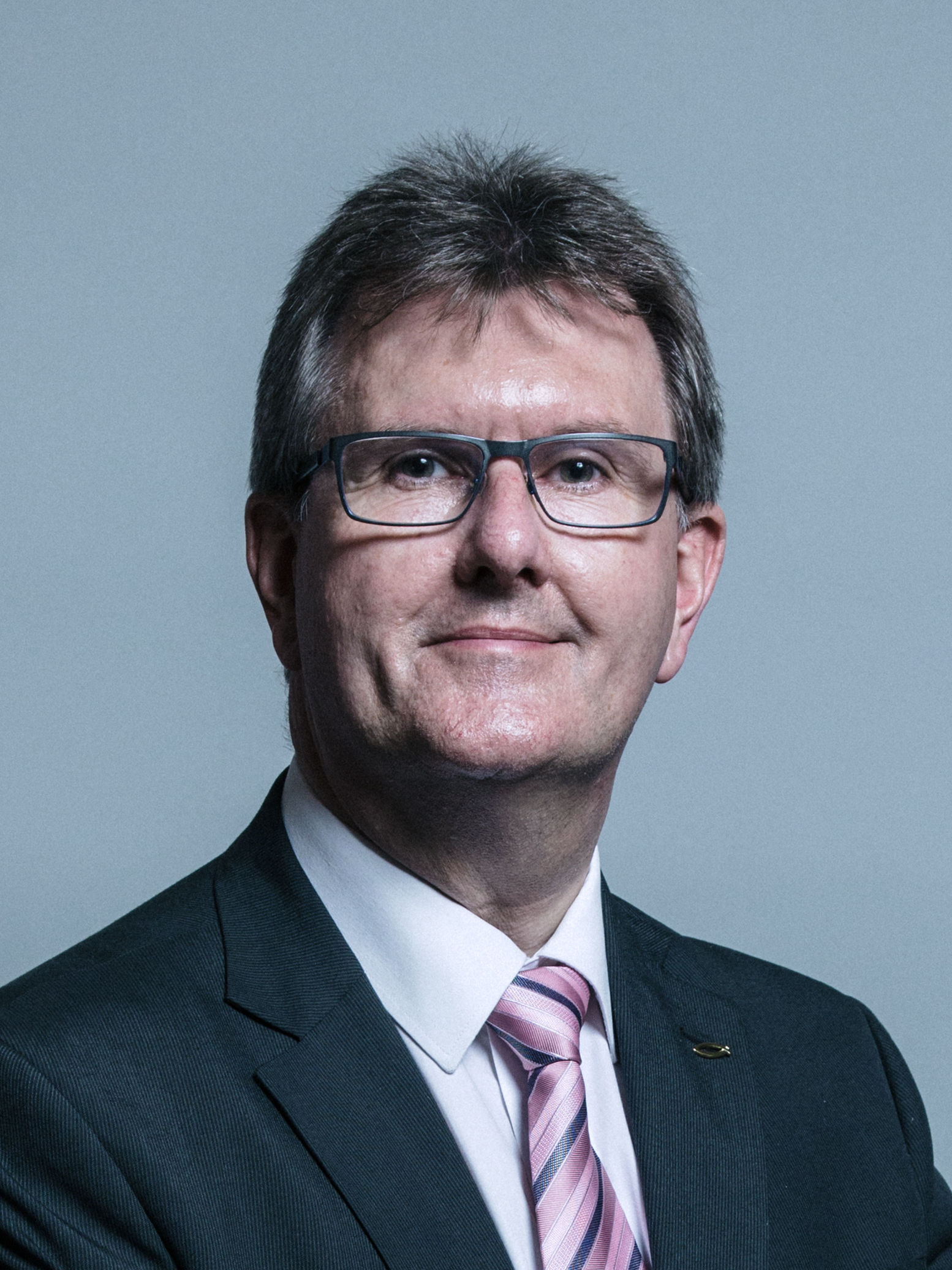
- Official portrait, 2017

Leader of the Democratic Unionist Party
- In office 30 June 2021 – 29 March 2024
- Deputy: Paula Bradley; Gavin Robinson
- Preceded by: Edwin Poots
- Succeeded by: Gavin Robinson

Leader of the Democratic Unionist Party in the House of Commons
- In office 17 December 2019 – 29 March 2024
- Leader: Arlene Foster; Edwin Poots; Himself
- Preceded by: Nigel Dodds
- Succeeded by: Gavin Robinson

Democratic Unionist Party Chief Whip in the House of Commons
- In office 8 May 2015 – 17 December 2019
- Leader: Nigel Dodds
- Preceded by: Office established
- Succeeded by: Sammy Wilson

Junior Minister at the Office of the First Minister and Deputy First Minister
- In office 26 February 2008 – 1 July 2009 Serving with Gerry Kelly
- Preceded by: Ian Paisley Jr
- Succeeded by: Robin Newton

Member of the Northern Ireland Assembly for Lagan Valley
- In office 26 November 2003 – 14 June 2010
- Preceded by: Patrick Roche
- Succeeded by: Paul Givan

Member of Parliament for Lagan Valley
- In office 1 May 1997 – 30 May 2024
- Preceded by: Sir James Molyneaux
- Succeeded by: Sorcha Eastwood

Member of Lisburn City Council
- In office 5 May 2005 – 5 May 2011
- Preceded by: Thomas Archer
- Succeeded by: Alan Carlisle
- Constituency: Lisburn Town South

Member of the Northern Ireland Forum for Lagan Valley
- In office 30 May 1996 – 25 April 1998

Member of the Northern Ireland Assembly for South Down
- In office 17 October 1985 – 1986
- Preceded by: Raymond McCullough
- Succeeded by: Assembly dissolved

Personal details
- Born: 7 December 1962 (age 63) Kilkeel, Northern Ireland
- Party: Ulster Unionist Party (until 2003); Democratic Unionist Party (2004–2026)
- Spouse: Eleanor Cousins (m. 1987)
- Children: 2
- Education: Castlereagh College

Military service
- Allegiance: United Kingdom
- Branch/service: British Army
- Rank: Corporal
- Unit: Ulster Defence Regiment
- Criminal information
- Status: Imprisoned
- Convictions: Rape (1 count); Gross indecency (4 counts); Indecent assault (13 counts)
- Trial: Trial of Jeffrey Donaldson
- Penalty: 15 years' imprisonment

Jeffrey Mark Donaldson (born 7 December 1962) is a Northern Irish former politician who served as leader of the Democratic Unionist Party (DUP) from 2021 to 2024. He resigned following his arrest for child sex offences and was later convicted.

Donaldson was a member of the Orange Order and served in the Ulster Defence Regiment (UDR) during the Troubles. He was also the campaign manager for the Ulster Unionist Party (UUP) MP Enoch Powell's re-election campaigns in 1983 and 1986. He was the Member of Parliament (MP) for Lagan Valley from 1997 to 2024 and also represented Lagan Valley as a Member of the Legislative Assembly (MLA) in the Northern Ireland Assembly from 2003 to 2010. Donaldson was critical of UUP leader David Trimble's support of the Good Friday Agreement during the Northern Ireland peace process, especially from 1998 to 2003. In 2003, Donaldson resigned from the UUP, becoming a member of the DUP in the following year.

After the 2019 general election, Donaldson became the DUP Westminster leader. He was a candidate in the May 2021 DUP leadership election, losing to Edwin Poots. After Poots resigned the following month, Donaldson was elected unopposed in the June 2021 DUP leadership election. He was knighted in 2016, although the knighthood was annulled in 2026.

In February 2022, the Northern Ireland Executive collapsed due to DUP protests against the Northern Ireland Protocol. Donaldson opposed the Windsor Framework announced by the Sunak government in February 2023 and, for 22 months, Donaldson refused to nominate a Deputy First Minister to restore Stormont. In February 2024, the Northern Ireland Executive was restored after a deal was agreed by Donaldson with Sunak's government.

In March 2024, Donaldson was charged with sexual offences between 1985 and 2008, and stepped down as leader of the DUP—and was also suspended as a member—triggering a leadership election. He did not stand for re-election at the July 2024 general election. In June 2026, he was found guilty of 18 sexual offences, including rape, against two children, and, in October 2026, was sentenced to 15 years in prison.

== Early life ==
Jeffrey Mark Donaldson was born on 7 December 1962 in Kilkeel, County Down, Northern Ireland, the oldest of five boys and three girls. He attended Kilkeel High School, where he excelled at debating, then Castlereagh College. At the age of sixteen he joined the Orange Order, and then the UUP's Young Unionists.

Two of Donaldson's cousins were killed by the Provisional Irish Republican Army (IRA) while serving in the Royal Ulster Constabulary (RUC): Sam Donaldson was killed in 1970 and Alex Donaldson, a Chief Inspector, died in a mortar attack on a Newry police station in 1985.

Donaldson served with the Kilkeel company of the 3rd Battalion, Ulster Defence Regiment (3 UDR), and was promoted to corporal.

Donaldson worked as an insurance broker in the 1980s.

== Political career ==
From 1982 to 1984, he was the constituency agent for the UUP MP Enoch Powell, managing Powell's successful re-election campaigns in 1983 and 1986. He then worked as personal assistant to the UUP leader James Molyneaux until Molyneaux retired from politics in 1997.

=== Entering politics ===
In October 1985, at the age of 22, following the death of Raymond McCullough, Donaldson was elected with a large majority in a by-election to the Northern Ireland Assembly to represent South Down. In April 1986, Donaldson took part in a unionist demonstration attempting to blockade a conference of the Ulster Teachers' Union held in Newcastle, County Down, in protest at the Anglo-Irish Agreement. Demonstrators blocked teachers' cars and scuffled with the police; at one point protestors broke through police lines and attacked Education Minister Brian Mawhinney's car with flag poles. After further violence, arrests were made. Donaldson told reporters afterward: "What we're saying to Brian Mawhinney here today is that he may think that he is an Ulsterman but the people of Ulster want no part of a man who has betrayed the people of Ulster." Mawhinney labelled the protestors "thugs". In June that year, after Secretary of State for Northern Ireland, Tom King, ordered the dissolution the Assembly, Donaldson was one of 21 unionist representatives who refused to leave the chamber at Stormont and was eventually physically removed from the building by the RUC.

In 1996, he was first-placed candidate on the UUP list for the Northern Ireland Forum elections, virtually guaranteeing him a seat. Donaldson, by that time serving as Assistant Grand Master of the Orange Order, was a prominent figure in the ongoing Drumcree conflict over an annual loyalist parade in the town of Portadown. He justified unionist demonstrators cutting off Belfast International Airport by saying, "in a democracy people have the right to protest and unfortunately some people get inconvenienced." That led to his selection, in January 1997, as a candidate for the Westminster Parliament, and he was elected at the 1997 general election as the MP for the Lagan Valley constituency, succeeding James Molyneaux. At that time, he was tipped as a potential future leader of the Ulster Unionist Party.

In Richard English's book, Armed Struggle: The History of the IRA, Donaldson is quoted as saying that because of a "deep sense of injustice that I felt had been perpetrated against my people and specifically against my family", he joined both the UDR and the UUP at the age of 18 to oppose the IRA both militarily and politically.

=== Role in the peace process ===
In 1998, Donaldson was in the UUP's negotiating team for the Good Friday Agreement. However, on the morning the day the agreement was concluded on 10 April 1998, Donaldson walked out of the delegation. He rejected some of the arrangements, notably the lack of a link between Sinn Féin's admittance to government and IRA decommissioning. Privately Donaldson came close to meeting a senior republican leader and kept alive contacts with the republican movement through third parties.

=== Dissent from the UUP ===
Donaldson engineered several party council meetings in protest against David Trimble's policies. The council, however, backed Trimble's leadership, and on 23 June 2003, along with fellow MPs David Burnside and Martin Smyth, Donaldson resigned the Ulster Unionist whip at Westminster. The MPs remained party members and in November 2003 Assembly election Donaldson was elected to the Northern Ireland Assembly for the UUP as an MLA for Lagan Valley.

Following the success of the rival DUP in the same Assembly election of 2003, Donaldson reiterated his call for Trimble's immediate resignation, but the party continued to back Trimble. On 18 December 2003 Donaldson, Norah Beare MLA and Arlene Foster announced their resignation from the UUP, and on 5 January 2004 they announced that they had joined the DUP.

=== After joining the DUP ===
Donaldson was returned to the House of Commons in the 2005 UK general election and, in 2007, he was appointed to the Privy Council of the United Kingdom, entitling him to the honorific style of The Right Honourable. At the 2007 Northern Ireland Assembly election, he was re-elected as an MLA for Lagan Valley.

In July 2009, The Daily Telegraph reported that Donaldson had repaid £555 claimed for pay-to-view films in overnight hotel stays. In total, Donaldson submitted claim forms, including receipts, for 68 pay-to-view movies. The newspaper claimed "hotel sources confirmed that films he put on his expenses during 2004 and 2005 were in the highest price category offered to guests, covering the latest blockbusters and adult movies", although no evidence was offered and Donaldson issued an official statement denying watching any content of an adult or pornographic nature.

Donaldson was appointed to government by First Minister Peter Robinson, and held the position of Junior Minister in the Office of the First Minister and Deputy First Minister from 2008 to 2009. Being also an MP, he lost his position due to the DUP's phasing out of "double jobbing". Following his re-election to the House of Commons at the general election in May 2010, Donaldson stood down from the Northern Ireland Assembly on 10 June, and was replaced on 16 June by Paul Givan.

He was a member of the Public Bill Committee for the Defence Reform Act 2014.

=== 2017 Conservative–DUP agreement ===
Following the 2017 general election, which resulted in a hung parliament, the Democratic Unionist Party agreed to support Theresa May's minority Conservative government. On 26 June 2017, Donaldson, serving as the DUP's Chief Whip in Westminster, co-signed the formal confidence and supply agreement at 10 Downing Street alongside the Conservative Chief Whip, Gavin Williamson. As a central figure in negotiating the pact, Donaldson helped secure an additional £1 billion in funding for infrastructure and public services in Northern Ireland in exchange for the DUP's legislative support.

=== DUP leadership ===
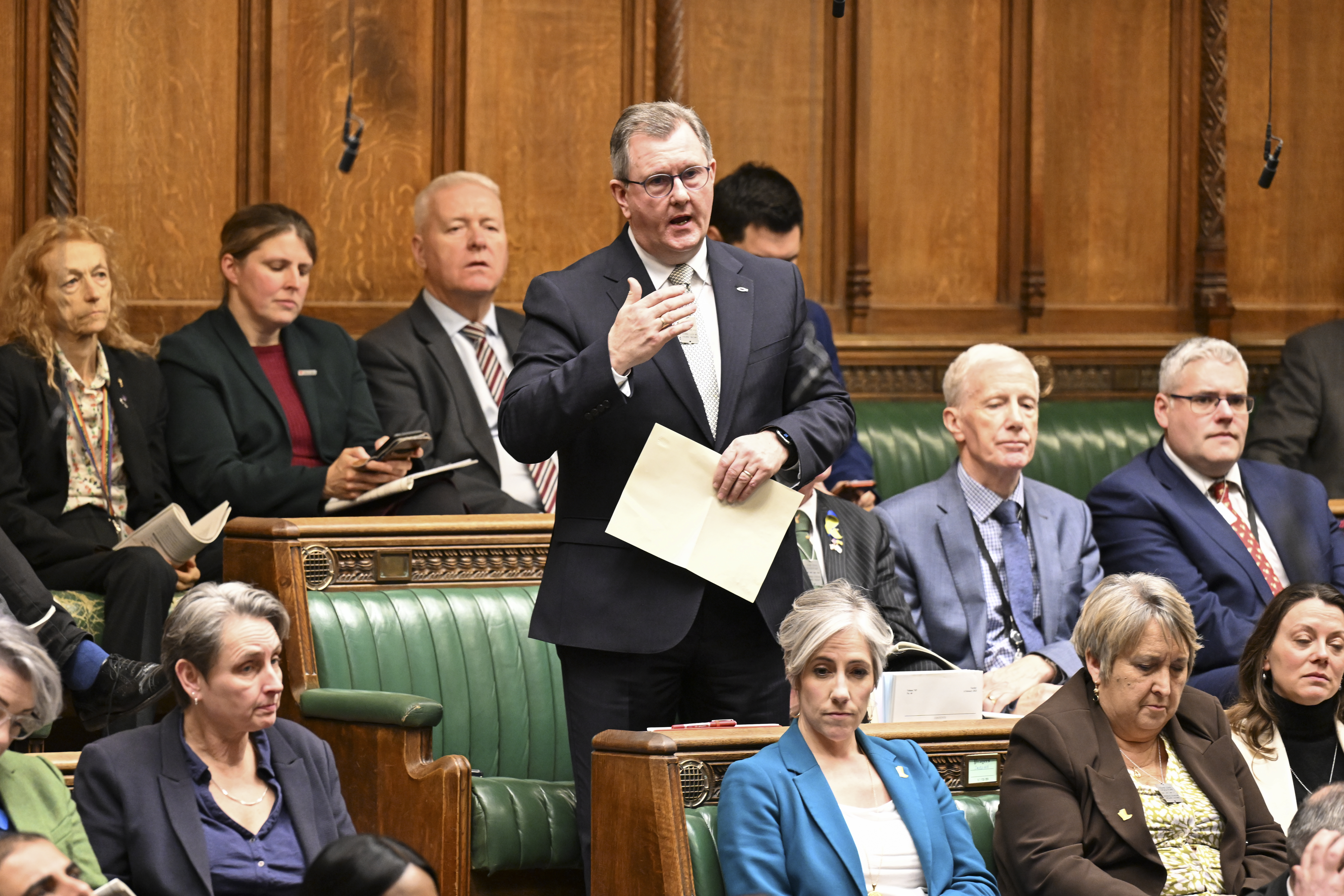
Donaldson speaking during Prime Minister's Questions, 7 February 2024

On 3 May 2021, Donaldson declared his candidacy for the leadership of the DUP to replace Arlene Foster. He lost the subsequent leadership election to Edwin Poots MLA, by 19 votes to 17.

Poots resigned after only 21 days as leader, having faced an internal revolt against his decision to proceed without delay to nominate Paul Givan as First Minister, after Sinn Féin had reached an agreement with the British government on an Irish Language Act. The Belfast Telegraph described the events as "one of the most tumultuous days in the DUP's 50-year history".

On 21 June, Donaldson declared his candidacy for the leadership of the DUP to replace Poots, pledging to make the Northern Ireland Protocol his main priority. He was the sole candidate. The party's electoral college endorsed him as leader-designate and he was confirmed in the post by the party's ruling executive on 30 June.

In July 2021, Donaldson said in a UTV interview that he intended to resign his seat as a Westminster MP and become Northern Ireland First Minister before the 2022 Northern Ireland Assembly election, but also said that he did not yet know precisely how he would bring that about.

In August 2021, UK Prime Minister, Boris Johnson, appointed Donaldson as the UK's trade envoy to Cameroon, in addition to his role as the trade envoy to Egypt.

It was announced on 24 August 2021, that Donaldson was planning to stand as a candidate for Lagan Valley in the Assembly election the following year if he was not co-opted to a vacant seat in the time leading up to the election. Plans were drawn up to temporarily re-allow "double jobbing", which would have allowed Donaldson to be in the Assembly and remain an MP. However, these plans were dropped, so, if Donaldson were to become a member of the Assembly, he would cease to be an MP, triggering a by-election. Donaldson was elected to the Assembly in the May 2022 election, but declined to take up his seat, with the party instead co-opting Emma Little-Pengelly. Donaldson said he would not take up his Assembly seat until the situation over the Northern Ireland Protocol was resolved.

On 29 March 2024, Donaldson resigned as DUP leader after being charged with rape and other historical sexual allegations, which he said he would "strenuously contest". Due to the ongoing case, John McBurney, Donaldson's solicitor, confirmed in May 2024 that Donaldson would not be contesting the July 2024 general election.

=== Views ===
Donaldson opposed the Good Friday Agreement. He supported Brexit, but called for the Northern Ireland Protocol agreement between the UK and the EU in December 2020, which establishes a customs and regulatory border in the Irish Sea separating Northern Ireland from Great Britain, to be reformed or revoked. Despite his earlier rejection of the Good Friday Agreement, he stated in January 2021 that the Protocol "actually undermines the Good Friday agreement".

In 2009, Donaldson was accused of making anti-Catholic comments. SDLP deputy leader Alasdair McDonnell demanded an apology from Donaldson and a retraction of his claim that Catholics owed allegiance in the first instance to the Pope and the Holy See.

In March 2019, Donaldson was one of 21 MPs who voted against LGBT-inclusive sex and relationship education in English schools. He opposes same-sex marriage in Northern Ireland, legalised by the British Government in December 2019.

Speaking of his national identity, Donaldson said that he is "Irish and British, Northern Irish and British, and British." He noted that he was a member of the Presbyterian Church in Ireland, which is organised on an all-Ireland basis. He described his national identity as geographically Irish, but also as being "part of a wider group of nations that is British". He believes that there is no contradiction in identifying as Irish, Northern Irish and British.

== Business interests ==
In 2010, Donaldson and his brother Kingsley founded the Causeway Institute for Peace-building and Conflict Resolution. In 2018, Donaldson threatened to sue social justice monitor openDemocracy regarding an article on their website that published details about work Causeway had performed for the Al Khalifa dictatorship in Bahrain in the wake of the regime's brutal crackdown on protesters during anti-Bahraini government protests in 2011. As a result of this action, the article was voluntarily removed from the internet by openDemocracy after taking legal advice.

Also in 2018, human rights organisation Reprieve produced a critical report about Causeway, stating that the company had provided training to the Bahrain Institute for Political Development, which had acted to "whitewash rights violations and limit press freedoms" on behalf of the Bahrain government. Causeway was also accused in the report of successfully lobbying to have all references to torture removed from a United Nations Human Rights Council report on Bahrain's human rights record.

In response, legal action was again threatened, with Donaldson's brother Kingsley stating that the report was "highly inaccurate and misleading", while Jeffrey was quoted as calling the same report "inaccurate, misleading and defamatory".

Regarding the 2018 report published by Reprieve, Bahrain Institute for Rights and Democracy director Sayed Alwadaei was quoted as saying: "UK government training to Bahrain, carried out by NI-CO and Causeway, has done nothing but provide the regime with another layer of impunity. With help from the UK, the Bahraini government is now better positioned to whitewash its human rights violations".

== Personal life ==
On 26 June 1987, Donaldson married Eleanor Cousins, with whom he has two daughters. They lived in Dromore in County Down. He is a member of the mainstream Presbyterian Church in Ireland. In 2008, Donaldson had an extramarital affair with a woman in London.

After his re-election to Parliament in 2010, Donaldson made references in his acceptance speech to false slurs being spread about his sexuality. When later confronted by a journalist from the Ulster Star newspaper about a rumour he was having an affair with a gay man, Donaldson vehemently denied it was true and dismissed it as "smear tactics to gain some political advantage".

In 2020, Donaldson briefly split up with his wife after she suspected him of having an affair and recorded him having a flirtatious conversation using a covert listening device she installed in his car.

In June 2026, a BBC investigation reported on a "double life" led by Donaldson, stating that he had been seen by London-based senior PSNI officers entering a gay sauna near Vauxhall Gardens in 2006. Former head of the PSNI's Serious Crime Branch Tim Hanley said he was "100% sure" Donaldson entered the building.

== Child sexual abuse convictions ==
On 28 March 2024, Donaldson was arrested by the Police Service of Northern Ireland (PSNI) and charged with rape and several other sexual offences between 1985 and 2008. His wife was also charged with aiding and abetting in relation to the same matter. He resigned as leader of the DUP the following day. The Orange Order and the DUP suspended his memberships in March 2024 pending the outcome of the judicial process, in line with their rules. Donaldson stated that he would contest the charges.

As Donaldson and his wife were co-defendants, they were initially bailed to separate addresses; she returned to their home in Dromore, while he travelled to London to reside in a flat in Greenwich. In response to what it described as "unhelpful speculation" by some members of the public and media regarding whether his legal situation had influenced his decision to restore the Executive in January 2024, the PSNI issued a statement clarifying that it first received a complaint leading to his arrest in early March 2024; it was reported in the Irish Independent that allegations had been made to police as early as January 2024.

Donaldson faced 18 charges regarding offences against two victims who were children at the time of the abuse: one count of rape, four of gross indecency, and 13 of indecent assault. His wife was initially charged with aiding and abetting Donaldson, but was ruled unfit to stand trial due to mental health issues; a trial of the facts, in which a jury determines the facts without a verdict regarding guilt, found that she had aided and abetted his offending.

On 22 June 2026, Donaldson was found guilty at Newry Crown Court of all 18 charges, and remanded in custody. On 15 October 2026, he received a prison sentence of 15 years, 4 years for offences against Complainant A and 11 years for offences against Complainant B, and was registered as a sex offender.

=== Donaldson post-conviction legal issues ===
On 21 October 2026, the Metropolitan Police announced they were investigating Donaldson regarding an allegation he had raped a woman from Northern Ireland inside the Palace of Westminster while giving her a tour of the House of Commons in 2016. It was also alleged that Donaldson attempted to get the woman to drink shots of vodka in his office then tried to kiss her and put his hand up her skirt. On 22 October, Lagan Valley MP Sorcha Eastwood raised an urgent question in the House of Commons about the Parliament rape allegations.

== Honours ==
Donaldson was sworn in as a member of Her Majesty's Most Honourable Privy Council in 2007, which entitled him to the honorific style "The Right Honourable". In the 2016 Birthday Honours, he was appointed Knight Bachelor for political service.

Following his conviction in June 2026, Donaldson resigned his role as a Privy Counsellor, confirmed by the Orders and Proclamations during the meeting of the Privy Council on 8 July 2026. Donaldson further requested that his knighthood be forfeited, which was done on 23 July.

Northern Ireland Assembly (1982)
Preceded by Raymond McCullough	MPA for South Down; 1985–1986	Assembly abolished
Northern Ireland Forum
New forum	Member for Lagan Valley; 1996–1998	Assembly abolished
Parliament of the United Kingdom
Preceded by James Molyneaux	Member of Parliament for Lagan Valley; 1997–2024	Succeeded by Sorcha Eastwood
Northern Ireland Assembly
Preceded by Patrick Roche	MLA for Lagan Valley; 2003–2010	Succeeded by Paul Givan
Political offices
Preceded by Ian Paisley Jr	Junior Minister; 2008–2009	Succeeded by Robin Newton
Party political offices
Preceded by Edwin Poots	Leader of the Democratic Unionist Party; 2021–2024	Succeeded by Gavin Robinson
