= 2021 Democratic Unionist Party leadership election =

2021 Democratic Unionist Party leadership election may refer to:

- May 2021 Democratic Unionist Party leadership election, won by Edwin Poots
- June 2021 Democratic Unionist Party leadership election, won by Jeffrey Donaldson
