= Trial of Jeffrey Donaldson =

2026 criminal court case of former DUP leader Sir Jeffrey Donaldson

R v Jeffrey and Eleanor Donaldson
- Court: Newry Crown Court
- Full case name: THE KING v JEFFREY MARK DONALDSON AND ELEANOR MARY ELIZABETH DONALDSON (24/051565)
- Started: 26 May 2026
- Decided: 22 June 2026
- Verdict: Jeffrey Donaldson guilty as charged on all 18 counts
- Charge: Jeffrey Donaldson rape (1 count) gross indecency (4 counts) indecent assault (13 counts)

Court membership
- Judge sitting: Judge Paul Ramsey

In March 2024, Jeffrey Donaldson, then leader of the Democratic Unionist Party (DUP) in Northern Ireland, was charged with one count of rape, 13 counts of indecent assault and four counts of gross indecency against two women when they were children, between 1985 and 2008. His wife, the then Lady Eleanor Donaldson, was also charged with aiding-and-abetting offences relating to the same matter. After several delays a trial date of 26 May 2026 was set for both defendants, but a subsequent court ruling found that Eleanor was unfit to stand trial due to mental health issues.

Jeffrey Donaldson was found guilty on 22 June 2026 of all 18 offences. In a trial of the facts, the jury found that Eleanor Donaldson had aided and abetted her husband.

== Background ==
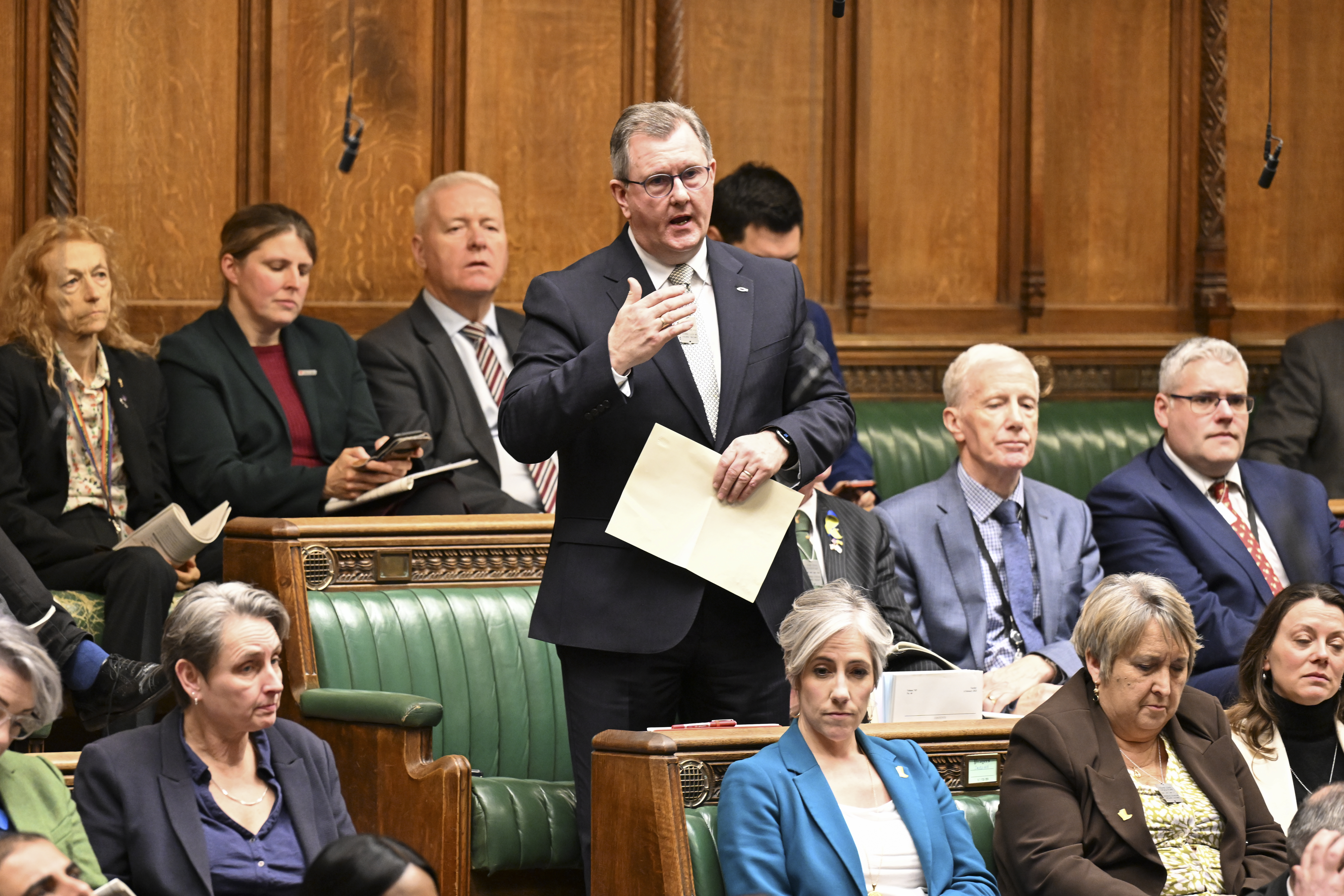
Jeffrey Donaldson speaking in the House of Commons in February 2024.

On 30 June 2021, Jeffrey Donaldson became leader of the DUP following the resignation of Edwin Poots. As part of the party's protest against the Northern Ireland Protocol, First Minister Paul Givan resigned in February 2022, collapsing the Northern Ireland Executive. Although initially opposed to the Windsor Framework, Donaldson announced on 30 January 2024 that the DUP had secured sufficient changes to the deal to end its boycott and return to Stormont.

At around 6 am on 28 March 2024, Donaldson and his wife, Eleanor, were arrested at their home near Dromore in County Down by the Police Service of Northern Ireland (PSNI) and taken to Antrim Police Station for questioning regarding non-recent sexual offences. That evening, Donaldson was charged with rape and additional sexual offences, while Eleanor was charged with aiding-and-abetting offences. Donaldson resigned as DUP leader and stated in his resignation letter that he would be "strenuously contesting the charges".

Donaldson was initially charged with 11 offences relating to two complainants: one count of rape allegedly committed between 1985 and 1991, one count of gross indecency towards a child allegedly committed in 2005 or 2006, and nine counts of indecent assault allegedly committed between 1985 and 2006. Eleanor was charged with aiding and abetting cruelty, rape, and indecent assault, relating to two complainants and alleged to have occurred between 1985 and 2004. As co-defendants, they were bailed to separate addresses; she returned to their home in Dromore, while he travelled to London to reside in an apartment in the Greenwich area.

== Pretrial legal proceedings ==
On 24 April 2024, Donaldson and his wife appeared before Newry Magistrates' Court to confirm that they understood the charges. They were bailed at £350 each, and the restriction preventing contact between them was lifted. On 3 July 2024, they again appeared before the court, where prosecution lawyers stated that there was a prima facie case to answer and neither defendant made contrary submissions. Both confirmed they understood the charges and declined to make verbal or written statements.

The court heard that Donaldson now faced 18 charges in total:

- one charge of rape
- four of gross indecency towards a child
- thirteen charges of indecent assault of a female child

Eleanor's charges increased from four to five:

- one charge of aiding and abetting rape
- one charge of cruelty towards a person under the age of 16
- three charges of aiding and abetting the assault of a female child

Both were released on continuing bail. On 10 September 2024, at an arraignment hearing at Newry Crown Court, Donaldson entered a not guilty plea to all 18 historical sexual offences.

In late October 2024, Eleanor's legal team applied to have two of her five charges withdrawn. During a February 2025 hearing, a video recording of one complainant's Achieving Best Evidence interview was played to Judge Paul Ramsey. Defence submissions were made by Ian Turkington, while prosecution barrister Rosie Walsh argued for the charges to remain. Both defendants were present but were not required to make submissions during the three‑hour hearing. On 28 February 2025, Judge Ramsey rejected the application and ruled that Eleanor should be tried on all five charges. Her legal team confirmed she would plead not guilty to all charges.

On 14 March 2025, it was announced that Eleanor was unfit to stand trial due to a medical issue. Judge Ramsey granted an adjournment, with a review scheduled for 16 May 2025 to consider a new trial date. A new start date of 3 November 2025 was later listed, with an assessment of Eleanor's fitness expected by mid‑July 2025. On 5 June 2025, Turkington provided medical reports from a consultant psychiatrist indicating a "significant mental deterioration", and further examinations were deemed necessary to assess her capacity to stand trial.

On 11 September 2025, the court heard that Judge Ramsey had received a psychiatrist's report commissioned by Eleanor's legal team, and that a prosecution‑appointed doctor would assess her the following week. The judge said he would review the case on 10 October 2025 and hoped to determine whether the trial could proceed in early November. However, the case was adjourned again until late October 2025 after it emerged that some of Eleanor's medical notes had not yet been provided to the prosecution. On 20 October 2025, Judge Ramsey vacated the 3 November trial date due to Eleanor's continuing poor health. Although no new date was set, he indicated that the trial would likely take place in the new year, with a further hearing scheduled for 23 January 2026 to consider updated psychiatric reports.

In February 2026, a trial date of 26 May 2026 was set for both defendants, but a later hearing ruled that Eleanor was unfit to stand trial due to mental health issues. Christine Kennedy testified that she was "severely depressed" and suicidal, rendering her unable to instruct her legal team or follow proceedings. Judge Ramsey directed that she should instead undergo a trial of the facts concurrent with her husband's criminal trial, in which the jury would determine only whether she committed the acts alleged. He also rejected an application from Donaldson's legal team for separate trials.

== Trial ==
On the morning of 26 May 2026, Donaldson appeared at Newry Crown Court for the opening day of his trial. Eleanor, having been declared unfit to stand trial, did not attend. After jury selection had concluded, judge Paul Ramsey informed the jury of seven men and five women that the trial was expected to last between three and four weeks. On the same day, the PSNI issued a statement warning the public against online commentary or speculation that could prejudice proceedings or identify the complainants. Jeffrey Donaldson was represented by Kieran Vaughan, who had previously worked on Ched Evans' appeal, while Eleanor Donaldson was represented by Ian Turkington, who had previously been the lead defence barrister during the "Soldier F" murder trial .

=== Opening statements ===
Prosecution barrister Rosemary Walsh outlined to the jury how, two-and-a-half years earlier, the PSNI had been approached by two women who made allegations of child sexual abuse against Donaldson. The older of the two, referred to in court as 'Complainant B', told police of an incident in which Donaldson put his hand inside her underwear and sexually assaulted her, and another in which he fondled her exposed breasts without her consent. She further alleged that, during one incident, Eleanor entered the room while the abuse was taking place but immediately left again, closing the door behind her. 'Complainant A' also alleged that Donaldson had touched her breasts and, on another occasion, had forced his tongue into her mouth while kissing her against her will.

Walsh said that both complainants estimated that the abuse began when they were in primary school, although their recollections of the precise timelines were not exact. 'Complainant B' alleged that Donaldson had raped her while she pretended to be asleep, recalling "wanting to go home" afterwards. She additionally claimed in police interviews that frequent indecent assaults were carried out over a number of years, and that as she grew older she confided in several people. A meeting was arranged by a religious group between the complainant and Donaldson in January 1997, and although he apologised for what he "had done in the past", nothing specific was discussed. 'Complainant A' told police about becoming sexually aware from a young age and having vivid dreams of men doing "horrible things" to her. She also recalled waking one night to find Donaldson between her legs with a torch. She said she later confronted him about his behaviour, during which he allegedly nodded and looked at the floor but said nothing.

The court heard that Donaldson denied all accusations following his arrest in March 2024, while his wife Eleanor denied having aided and abetted his alleged offending. Walsh clarified that the charges against Eleanor were that she was aware of what was occurring at the time of the alleged offences.

=== Prosecution evidence ===
The trial began with both of Donaldson's accusers appearing via video link to testify for the prosecution, before other witnesses took the stand to give evidence. Finally, the jury were played recording of police interviews with Jeffrey and Eleanor Donaldson where specific allegations were put to them.

==== 'Complainant A' testimony ====
The March 2024 police interview of 'Complainant A' was played to the court, in which she told officers that Donaldson began abusing her from around primary school age, often fondling her breasts. She alleged that he continued to make comments about the size of her breasts in the years that followed, and that his inappropriate behaviour was "laughed off as a joke". She also recalled an alleged incident as a teenager in which Donaldson used a bright light to examine her genitals. When she reached university age, 'Complainant A' said she realised the behaviour was abnormal and became angry, considering the accolades he received in his public role as a politician. She initially confided in her husband about what had happened and later spoke to a counsellor from a charity that supported child abuse victims, before approaching the PSNI to make an official statement. 'Complainant A' also confronted Donaldson in the presence of another person, demanding that he confirm what had happened to her as a child; however, he allegedly looked at the floor and silently nodded his head rather than respond to her accusations.

After the video had ended, 'Complainant A' was questioned via videolink by prosecutor Walsh regarding a letter sent to her by Donaldson in June 2020. The letter was read aloud to the court, in which Donaldson expressed "how much I truly regret all the hurt, pain and distress I have caused", adding that he took "full responsibility for it all" and "I understand how deep the wounds are caused by my sinful and selfish actions". When asked what she thought the letter was referring to, 'Complainant A' said she felt Donaldson was trying to apologise for the abuse he committed but did not want to formally admit to it in writing.

Under cross-examination from Donaldson's barrister Kieran Vaughan, she denied having "foggy" recollections of the alleged incidents, asserting that what she meant when using that term during police interviews was that the exact timeline of when they occurred was unclear to her, adding that she remembered the incidents themselves in great detail due to the nature of what happened. Vaughan challenged 'Complainant A' by saying none of the incidents actually happened and that she had either made them up or dreamt them, to which she replied that someone randomly dreaming about it for no reason would be a "ridiculous idea". Vaughan went on to highlight inconsistencies in her statements to the PSNI compared with her testimony in court, where she had reported "touching over clothing" to the police but told the jury about Donaldson putting his hands up her top onto bare skin. 'Complainant A' dismissed the discrepancy and maintained that what she had said in court was factually correct.

Vaughan also asserted that the letter from Donaldson was not an apology for sexually assaulting her but a request for forgiveness for other behaviour, and that she had taken it out of context. He told the court that Donaldson had been kicked out of his house for a period in 2020 after his wife suspected him of having an affair, with Eleanor going so far as to plant a covert listening device in his car to gather evidence, and that the actual context of the letter was a marital dispute. 'Complainant A' rejected this argument, describing Donaldson as a "very astute" person who would never put anything incriminating in writing but would "instead only strongly hint at it". She also alleged that Eleanor had witnessed Donaldson touching her inappropriately but did not intervene to stop it. 'Complainant A' told the court that before making an official complaint, in early 2023 she had spoken to the minister of her church along with the Head of Safeguarding for the Presbyterian Church in Ireland. When challenged by Vaughan as to why she did not approach the police at that time, 'Complainant A' said she was hesitant to do so knowing the huge public and media attention the case would attract due to Donaldson's high profile.

'Complainant A' was also cross-examined by Eleanor's barrister, Ian Turkington, who questioned the reliability of her childhood recollections of the alleged abuse and accused her of inventing details as she went along. Turkington referred to notes from a counselling session in which her memory was described as "really poor", though 'Complainant A' maintained that this reflected only the note‑taker's opinion. In response to the suggestion that she had fabricated the allegations, she said she found the proposition ridiculous and reaffirmed that Donaldson had abused her on numerous occasions and that his wife had been aware, adding that both defendants had laughed it off as a joke whenever she raised the issue. She specifically recalled telling Eleanor about an incident in which Donaldson used a bright light to examine her genitals, and although she was asked to provide corroborating details, the matter was never raised again.

==== 'Complainant B' testimony ====
A recorded police interview with 'Complainant B' was played to the court, in which she described an alleged incident in which Donaldson raped her while she was still in primary school. Although she recalled earlier occasions when Donaldson put his hands inside her underwear, she said she felt anxious because she believed this incident would be different. 'Complainant B' stated that she pretended to be asleep, and that after spreading her legs apart Donaldson sexually abused her with both his hands and his penis. She also described another incident in which Donaldson followed her into a room and, after closing the door, lifted her top and fondled her breasts. She alleged that Eleanor entered the room, saw what was happening, and then "turned round and walked out", closing the door behind her.

Appearing via videolink, 'Complainant B' went on to explain that she had been referred to a Christian centre as a teenager after becoming involved with alcohol and drugs. A meeting was later arranged between her and Donaldson when she was about 17 at the Christian Family Centre in Armoy, where he apologised for "what he’d done to me in the past". She said she understood the apology to relate to sexual abuse because she had previously told Claire Selfridge (née Hoy), daughter of the centre's managers Linda and Davey Hoy, about the incidents and who had perpetrated them. She further alleged that in summer 2023 Linda Hoy sent her a text message saying that Eleanor needed to meet her as she "needs my forgiveness to move forward", although 'Complainant B' did not respond.

During cross-examination, Donaldson's barrister Vaughan put it to 'Complainant B' that none of the alleged incidents had occurred, noting that she had given different ages and timelines to various people. When asked about telling a doctor in 2008 that the abuse began when she was aged nine or ten, but estimating in her 2024 police interview that it began when she was seven, she said counselling sessions in the intervening years had helped her recall earlier incidents in more detail. She maintained that she was telling the truth and that all the incidents had definitely taken place, adding that she wished they had never happened. Asked why she had not disclosed the alleged abuse at the time, she said it had been a mistake not to report it and that she regretted that decision every day, adding that she blamed herself for the abuse allegedly later suffered by 'Complainant A'.

Vaughan also questioned her about her teenage drug use and an allegation of theft. She admitted using ecstasy and marijuana and stealing approximately £500, which led to her attending the Christian Family Centre. Regarding the meeting with Donaldson there, she denied that he had said, "If that's the way I made you feel, I apologise" after she told him he "hadn't made you comfortable with the relationship at the time". Vaughan suggested she had made the allegations as a means of being sent home from Armoy, which she denied, asserting that her time at the centre ultimately proved positive. He further highlighted that she had contacted Donaldson as an adult seeking assistance with minor matters, suggesting she had been comfortable approaching him. 'Complainant B' said she had wanted to show Donaldson that she had built a life for herself, and that seeking help with work and travel issues did not alter what had happened in her childhood.

Turkington cross‑examined 'Complainant B' on behalf of Eleanor, stating that his client denied enabling rape and that all accusations were false. He said that although Eleanor had seen Donaldson in the same room as 'Complainant B', she had witnessed nothing inappropriate. Turkington told the court that Eleanor had asked Donaldson "many times" about the alleged breast‑fondling incident because "something she didn't like [was] going on", but later told police she "couldn't get anywhere with it". In response, 'Complainant B' said she was telling the truth and that Eleanor had seen her being abused by her husband. Turkington suggested that it was only after receiving the 2023 text message about Eleanor wanting to apologise that she began to think Eleanor had observed anything improper. 'Complainant B' replied that the message merely confirmed her long‑held belief that Eleanor had been an eyewitness to the abuse.

==== Witness testimony ====
The husband of 'Complainant A' told the court that in 2019 his wife disclosed to him that Donaldson had sexually abused her "on a number of occasions" when she was a child, describing alleged incidents such as him forcing his tongue into her mouth when kissing and inappropriate touching. She also told him that Eleanor had once walked in on Donaldson abusing her. Under cross‑examination by Kieran Vaughan, he said that 'Complainant A' had not reported the matter earlier because it had taken years for her to process such traumatic experiences.

The court also heard evidence from a Presbyterian minister and his wife, who from December 2022 had provided a series of pastoral support meetings to 'Complainant A' and her husband regarding allegations of abuse by an unnamed "perpetrator". The minister told the court that in July 2023 he received a number of WhatsApp messages from Donaldson, one of which stated "I just want to find a way to let them know how sorry I am and to repent before them as I have before the Lord".

Claire Selfridge gave evidence via videolink from South Africa, telling the court how she first met 'Complainant B' when they were both teenagers at her parent's Christian centre in Armoy, and how 'Complainant B' confided in her how she had previously been subjected to abuse. Selfridge said 'Complainant B' then asked her to break it to her mother. However, when Selfridge phoned and told her, 'Complainant B's mother laughed it off and said she was only making up the allegations for attention. Selfridge told the court she was horrified at the reaction, however when she told 'Complainant B', she did not appear to be shocked that her mother did not believe her.

A police interview video with Pastor Stephen Matthews was played to the court, in which he described meeting 'Complainant B' in the 1990s at the Armoy centre, where she made allegations of sexual abuse against an unnamed politician. Although she would only reveal that the person in question was a member of the Ulster Unionist Party from the Kilkeel area, Pastor Matthews told interviewing officers he deduced that it was Donaldson.

David Hoy described to the court how he founded the Christian Family Centre in Armoy with his wife Linda in 1990, and that he was contacted by Pastor Matthews to say that 'Complainant B' had made serious allegations about Donaldson. Hoy was then asked to facilitate a meeting with the pair at his home in late January 1997, at which his wife also attended. Hoy told the court Donaldson spoke first to say, "I know what this is about. I'm sorry. Please forgive me." to which a tearful 'Complainant B' replied that she did forgive him. Hoy added that the meeting was very short and there was no discussion about what the allegations actually were. Linda Hoy also described the 1997 meeting to the court, adding that years later she sent a text message to 'Complainant B' on behalf of Eleanor, in which she said Eleanor wanted to be forgiven as her husband had been. Hoy also alleged that Eleanor had confessed to her about walking in on Donaldson and 'Complainant B' during an incident disclosed earlier in court proceedings. When cross-examined by Vaughan, both David and Linda Hoy confirmed that 'Complainant B' never made any allegations regarding sexual abuse to either of them during the entire time she attended the Christian centre in Armoy.

==== Donaldson police interviews ====
Video recordings of Donaldson's March 2024 police interviews were played to the jury, in which he was initially asked if he wished to make any comment after being informed of the complainants' identities and the relevant timelines, to which Donaldson replied "No". Officers then put it to Donaldson that a complaint had accused him of rubbing his penis against her clitoris before he then inserted it into the entrance of her vagina, to which Donaldson denied the incident happened. He denied fondling her breasts or his wife witnessing the abuse. Regarding allegations from 'Complainant A' that he used a bright light to examine her genitals, Donaldson denied shining a light on her during the incident and asserted that nothing "untoward" happened on that occasion. Although Donaldson did admit apologising to 'Complainant B' at the Armoy religious centre, he asserted this was for making her feel uncomfortable. Donaldson stated that Christian Family Centre manager David Hoy rang him to say 'Complainant B' had made an unspecified complaint about him, adding that no specific allegations were ever put to him. When questioned about the letter he sent to 'Complainant A', Donaldson denied it was related to sex abuse but instead was an apology for other matters. Donaldson also denied nodding his head when confronted by 'Complainant A' in the presence of her husband, asserting that their "recollection of the conversation is different from mine".

Recordings of Eleanor's March 2024 police interviews were also played to the court, where although she admitted walking in on Donaldson and 'Complainant B' while they were alone together in a darkened room, she asserted both were fully clothed, adding than any time she asked her husband about the incident he refused to discuss it and "just dismissed it". She also claimed to be unaware of why exactly Donaldson had asked for forgiveness from 'Complainant B' at the Armoy meeting in the 1990s. Eleanor stated to the questioning officers that she had never witnessed any inappropriate behaviour between her husband and 'Complainant B', and that she did not have any concerns regarding 'Complainant A' either. When challenged as to why she kept asking her husband about the incident with 'Complainant B' over the years if she had not seen anything untoward, Eleanor replied that she was uncomfortable about the fact that every time she attempted to bring it up Donaldson refused to talk about it and she was "met with a blank wall".

=== Defence submissions ===
Taking the stand to give evidence in his own defence, Donaldson denied all allegations made by both complainants and said that the letter he had written to 'Complainant A' was not an apology for alleged sexual abuse. He accepted, in response to questions from his defence barrister Vaughan, that he had an extramarital affair in 2008 with a woman in London, and said he was asked to leave the family home in 2020 after his wife confronted him about "flirtatious messages" he had sent to a constituent. He maintained that the letter in question related to infidelity rather than abuse. Donaldson also denied that his wife Eleanor had witnessed any inappropriate behaviour or failed to intervene. Regarding a meeting at the Christian Centre in Armoy in 1997, he accepted that he had apologised to 'Complainant B' but denied that it was connected to alleged abuse.

During cross‑examination by prosecution barrister Walsh, Donaldson maintained that both complainants had lied and that he was telling the truth when he denied that any of the alleged incidents had occurred. When asked why he believed 'Complainant B' would make false allegations of such seriousness, he said he did not know. Walsh suggested that the alleged abuse of 'Complainant B' had escalated because he had never been confronted about it; Donaldson rejected that suggestion. He instead claimed that 'Complainant B' resented his political success and his impending election to the House of Commons at a time when she was experiencing drug‑related difficulties at the Armoy religious centre.

In relation to the 1997 meeting in Armoy, Walsh put it to Donaldson that he had immediately taken control of the discussion by stating that he knew why he had been called there. Donaldson repeated that he had apologised only for making 'Complainant B' feel uncomfortable, and said she had lied when making allegations to Claire Selfridge and Pastor Matthews. Walsh reminded the court that David and Linda Hoy, who were present at the meeting, had testified that Donaldson "asked for forgiveness" from 'Complainant B'. Donaldson denied using those words, and when it was put to him that religious witnesses such as the Hoys would be unlikely to give false evidence, he said his recollection of the meeting "differed" from theirs.

When the allegations of 'Complainant A' were put to him, Donaldson denied all of them and also denied nodding his head when confronted by her years later. Asked about a letter he sent to her in June 2020 seeking forgiveness, he said it did not relate to sexual abuse, and he denied that messages he sent to her and her husband expressing how sorry he was and wishing to "repent before them" were connected to allegations of abuse. Walsh concluded her cross‑examination by stating that "the only person telling lies is you, sinful and deceitful lies", to which Donaldson replied, "Not true".

At the conclusion of Donaldson's testimony, the legal teams for both him and Eleanor closed their case and did not call any further witnesses or evidence.

=== Closing statements ===
Addressing the jury, prosecuting barrister Rosemary Walsh referred to what she described as the "compelling testimony" of both complainants, saying the distress they experienced was "visible". On the question of why the allegations had emerged many years after the events, Walsh argued that 'Complainant B' had learned of the alleged abuse of 'Complainant A' and blamed herself for not having come forward sooner. She noted that 'Complainant B' had disclosed the allegations to others when she was a teenager, and therefore they were not invented at a later stage. The court also heard that 'Complainant A' had informed both her husband and Eleanor of alleged abuse by Donaldson, and that Eleanor had been accused of having "brushed [it] under the carpet" rather than taking action.

For the defence, Vaughan reminded the jury that the case rested on the complainants' accounts and Donaldson's denials, as no forensic or eyewitness evidence supported either side. He argued that 'Complainant B' was an unreliable witness who wished to deflect attention from her own difficulties with recreational drug use. Vaughan also questioned the fact that both complainants approached the police on the same day after many years, describing this as suspicious. He emphasised that the burden of proof lay with the prosecution and that Donaldson was not required to prove anything. Vaughan further submitted that 'Complainant A' was an unreliable witness, pointing to inconsistencies between her police statement and her court testimony. He rejected claims of a confrontation in May 2021 as untrue and argued that she had misrepresented the context of the June 2020 letter. Ian Turkington, representing Eleanor, said the prosecution had not proved its case against his client and questioned the reliability of memories of events said to have occurred decades earlier.

Before the jury retired to deliberate, judge Paul Ramsey summarised the evidence over two hours and instructed them that they could convict Donaldson only if satisfied that the prosecution had proved its case beyond reasonable doubt. He also told the jury that they must not be influenced by sympathy for either the Donaldsons or the complainants, and should reach their verdict solely on the evidence presented in court.

=== Verdict ===
On 22 June 2026, Donaldson was found guilty as charged on all 18 counts, including one count of rape, and was remanded into custody to await sentencing, with judge Ramsey stating "Take Mr. Donaldson down" before he was taken away by officers. Donaldson was reported to have shown no emotion as the verdict was read out. Eleanor was found to have aided and abetted him in committing the same offences.

=== Appeals ===
On 17 July 2026, Donaldson's legal team lodged papers to appeal his conviction, while his wife Eleanor applied for leave to appeal her jury verdict on 17 September 2026.

=== Sentencing ===
On 15 October 2026, Donaldson was sentenced to a total of 15 years in prison, which consisted of 11 years for the rape of Victim B and 4 years for all offences relating to Victim A, to be served consecutively. Judge Paul Ramsey remarked that Donaldson had not expressed "one word of regret, apology or shame" in relation to his offending.

== Reactions ==
First Minister for Northern Ireland Michelle O'Neill praised the courage of the complainants, writing on X that "It is difficult to find words that fully capture the immense courage they have shown, not only throughout this deeply distressing court case, but across their lifetimes." Likewise, Deputy First Minister Emma Little-Pengelly, who had been co-opted into her Lagan Valley seat after Donaldson, who was at the time still a sitting MP, won a seat in the 2022 Northern Ireland Assembly election, stated "today is the day for the victims", followed by "To have to go through a trial to get justice only adds to the trauma they have experienced. It takes a huge amount of courage for the victims of such abuse to come forward to pursue justice".

Many members of the DUP described a feeling of betrayal. Speaking to the Belfast Telegraph, party insiders claimed that Donaldson rarely spoke of his home life and they "never knew" the real Jeffrey. Party leader Gavin Robinson, who took over from Donaldson following his arrest, stated "the full force of the law shall be felt" and that he had "betrayed the trust" of his colleagues in the DUP.

Other political leaders in Northern Ireland also spoke out following the verdict. Jon Burrows, leader of the Ulster Unionist Party, of which Donaldson was a member until 2003, described him as an "absolute disgrace" and described the victims as heroes. Sinn Féin MP John Finucane stated "I think the immediate reaction, on behalf of everybody is with those victims and their loved ones." Deputy leader of the Alliance Party of Northern Ireland Eóin Tennyson stated "Today sends a message that no matter what the office you hold or the influence you have, no one is above the law", whilst Belfast South and Mid Down MP and leader of the Social Democratic and Labour Party Claire Hanna stated "Despite everything [the victims] went through in their lives, despite the mountain they had to climb going up against someone with every privilege in the world, they took their courage and they won." Independent unionist MLA Doug Beattie, who had recently left the UUP, stated "In this case, two brave women came forward and gave evidence that must have been extremely difficult to deliver."

== Aftermath ==
Following the verdict, there were widespread calls for Donaldson's knighthood, which had been awarded in the 2016 Birthday Honours, to be revoked. Jim Allister, the leader of the Traditional Unionist Voice and MP for North Antrim, tabled a motion in the House of Commons calling on the Prime Minister to advise the King to revoke Donaldson's knighthood. Allister also accused the UK Government of using Donaldson's past to coerce him into changing his position on the Irish Sea border, saying "To me it is inconceivable that the government was unaware of his proclivities and the idea of such being used as leverage is far from fanciful." Hanna wrote to the Cabinet Office requesting Donaldson be stripped of his knighthood, with Burrows stating "Now we need to see Jeffrey Donaldson stripped of that title of Sir. He deserves nothing of that nature." Tennyson likewise stated "I think it would be only appropriate that any honours would be stripped." On 24 June, Donaldson's solicitor John McBurney issued a letter to the Cabinet Office on his behalf requesting his knighthood be revoked, and confirming Donaldson would be resigning from the Privy Council with immediate effect. Donaldson's knighthood was formally annulled on 23 July.

== See also ==
- Northern Ireland Historical Institutional Abuse Inquiry
- Public Prosecution Service of Northern Ireland v. Liam Adams
