= List of Democratic Unionist Party MPs =

This is a list of Democratic Unionist Party MPs. It includes all members of Parliament elected to the British House of Commons representing the Democratic Unionist Party. Members of the European Parliament or the Northern Ireland Assembly are not listed.

Member	Constituency	Years served
Gregory Campbell	East Londonderry	2001–present
Jeffrey Donaldson	Lagan Valley	2004–2024 (Note: Defected from the Ulster Unionist Party.)
Nigel Dodds	Belfast North	2001–2019
Paul Girvan	South Antrim	2017–2024
Andrew Hunter	Basingstoke	2004–2005 (Note: Defected from the Conservative Party, sitting as an Independent Conservative between 2002 and 2004)
Carla Lockhart	Upper Bann	2019–2026 (Note: Left the party and sat as an independent.)
William McCrea	Mid Ulster; South Antrim	1983–1997; 2000–2001; 2005–2015
Johnny McQuade	Belfast North	1979–1983
Ian Paisley	North Antrim	1971–2010 (Note: Originally elected for the Protestant Unionist Party in 1970.)
Ian Paisley Jr	North Antrim	2010–2024
Emma Pengelly	Belfast South	2017–2019
Gavin Robinson	Belfast East	2015–present
Iris Robinson	Strangford	2001–2010 (Note: Expelled from the DUP in 2010 and sat briefly as an independent.)
Peter Robinson	Belfast East	1979–2010
Jim Shannon	Strangford	2010–present
David Simpson	Upper Bann	2005–2019
Sammy Wilson	East Antrim	2005–present

== Graphical representation ==
Constituency	1971	1979	1983	1997	2000	2001	2004	2005	2010	2015	2017	2019	2024	2026
Antrim North	Paisley								Paisley Jr					
Belfast East		P. Robinson								G. Robinson				
Belfast North		McQuade				Dodds								
Belfast South and Mid Down											Little-Pengelly			
Mid Ulster			McCrea											
South Antrim					McCrea			McCrea			Girvan			
Londonderry East						Campbell								
Strangford						I. Robinson			Shannon					
Lagan Valley							Donaldson							
Antrim East								Wilson						
Upper Bann								Simpson				Lockhart		
Basingstoke (England)							Hunter							
No. of DUP MPs	1	3	3	2	3	5	6/7	9	8	8	10	8	5	4
