= David Williamson (footballer) =

Hong Kong-born Northern Irish footballer

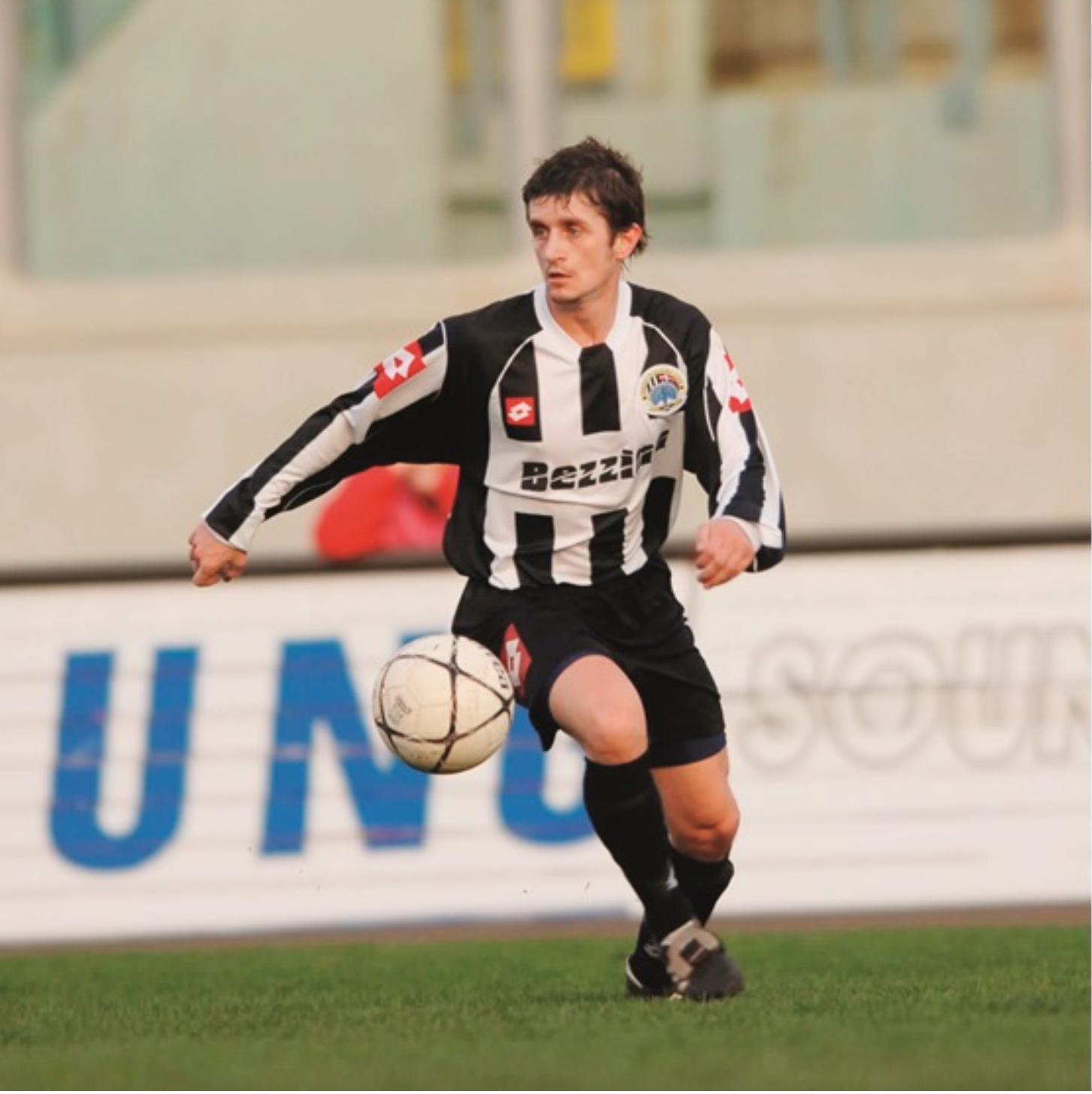

Personal information
- Full name: David Francis Williamson
- Date of birth: 15 December 1975 (age 50)
- Place of birth: British Hong Kong
- Position: Midfielder

Senior career*
Years	Team	Apps	(Gls)
1993–1994	Crusaders		
1994–1996	Motherwell		
1996–1998	Cambridge United	11	(0)
1997	→ Coleraine (loan)	6	
1998	Kettering Town		
1999	Yee Hope	21	(4)
2000	Sligo Rovers	2	
2000	→ Crusaders (loan)	19	
2000	Bohemians	18	(2)
2001–2002	Bray Wanderers	17	(2)
2002	Connecticut Wolves	19	(3)
2003	Kettering Town	23	(4)
2003	Ards	20	(2)
2004	Kitchee	21	(2)
2005	TP-47	16	(1)
2005–2006	Hibernians	19	(0)
- * Club domestic league appearances and goals

David Francis Williamson (born 15 December 1975) is a Hong Kong-born Northern Irish retired soccer player.

== Club career ==
Williamson was first spotted while playing in the Northern Ireland Milk Cup for County Fermanagh and was taken on by Castlereagh College in Belfast on their football course. Crusaders liked what they saw and snapped him up. When he was 18, he signed for Motherwell after a 2-week trial. However, Williamson struggled to make the breakthrough at Fir Park and only made 1 appearance in the first team. Roy McFarland brought him to Cambridge United but after a decent start, he dropped out of the starting XI and so went on a loan spell to Coleraine. He returned to Cambridge in time for the new season and got back into the first team and played in their first 15-20 games before unfortunately getting injured. Things were never the same after that so he took the decision to move to the land of his birth Hong Kong.

David spent a year and a half in Hong Kong and played for Yee Hope and Instant-Dict. He faced future teammate Kevin Hunt on his debut for Yee Hope. He returned to Ireland and signed for Sligo Rovers in January 2000 n a non-contract basis, making his debut against Bohemians. He impressed so much in that match that Bohs offered him a contract. There was controversy over this and the Eircom League refused to register his transfer. Williamson brought them to the High Court and won the case but David was not allowed to play for Bohs for the rest of the season. Crusaders took him up North on loan for the remainder of the season.

On his return to Dalymount Park, he slotted in straight away and played in Bohs' European campaign in the wins over Aberdeen and Kaiserslautern and contributed to Bohs Eircom league and Cup double success . However, he fell out favour with Roddy Collins and moved to Bray Wanderers on deadline day in January 2001 . He helped Bray to a finish of 4th place in the table by the end of that season.

In January 2004, he returned to Hong Kong and played for Kitchee, finishing 2nd in the Hong Kong Premier league and FA Cup.

After leaving Hong Kong, he had spells at Kettering in England, TP-47 in Finland and Hibernians F.C. of Malta. He made his debut for Hibernians F.C. of Malta in January 2006 against Birkirkara F.C.. He spent 8 months with the club winning the Maltese FA cup and finishing 2nd in the Premier league.

== International career ==
While in Hong Kong, he played twice for the Hong Kong national team in friendlies against Chinese clubs Guan-Jo and Xin-Xeng.

== Post-playing career ==
Since retiring through injury in 2007, he has since run his own Personal Training business and Sports Agency, Aspire Sports International.
