= Trial of the facts =

Trial in UK law that can take place when a defendant is medically unfit to plead

Under the law of England and Wales and the law of Northern Ireland regarding insanity and unfitness to plead, once a court has determined that the defendant is subject to a disability that prevents their trial progressing, there may be a "trial of the facts" or "examination of facts hearing" in which the truth of the allegations against the defendant, as opposed to their guilt or innocence of a crime, is to be determined. The court's options are: to order an absolute discharge; a supervision order; or a hospital order (with or without a restriction order).

The trial is not a criminal trial to determine guilt or otherwise; it is "limited to ensuring that the interference with the liberty of the defendant consequent upon whatever order might be made following an adverse finding can be justified by reference to what can be proved about what he or she did, even if intention might have been clouded by delusion or other incapacity."

== History ==
Under the earlier Criminal Procedure (Insanity) Act 1964, determination of unfitness to plead led to an assumption that the accused had committed the act, without need for the prosecution to submit evidence, followed by automatic admission to hospital. In consequence fitness to plead was very rarely raised by defendants.

Under the Criminal Procedure (Insanity and Unfitness to Plead) Act 1991, if the accused is found unfit to plead then a "trial of the facts" before a jury is held, so that the evidence against the defendant is tested to some degree. An unfit person would not necessarily require admission to a psychiatric hospital.

A notable "trial of the fact" took place in Northern Ireland in 2018, when Ivor Bell, a former IRA leader with vascular dementia, was found to be unfit to plead in a trial regarding the disappearance of Jean McConville. Another took place as part of the trial of Jeffrey Donaldson in 2026, in which his wife Eleanor was found unfit to plead.
