= Paul Givan =

Minister of Education of Northern Ireland since 2024

Paul Givan MLA
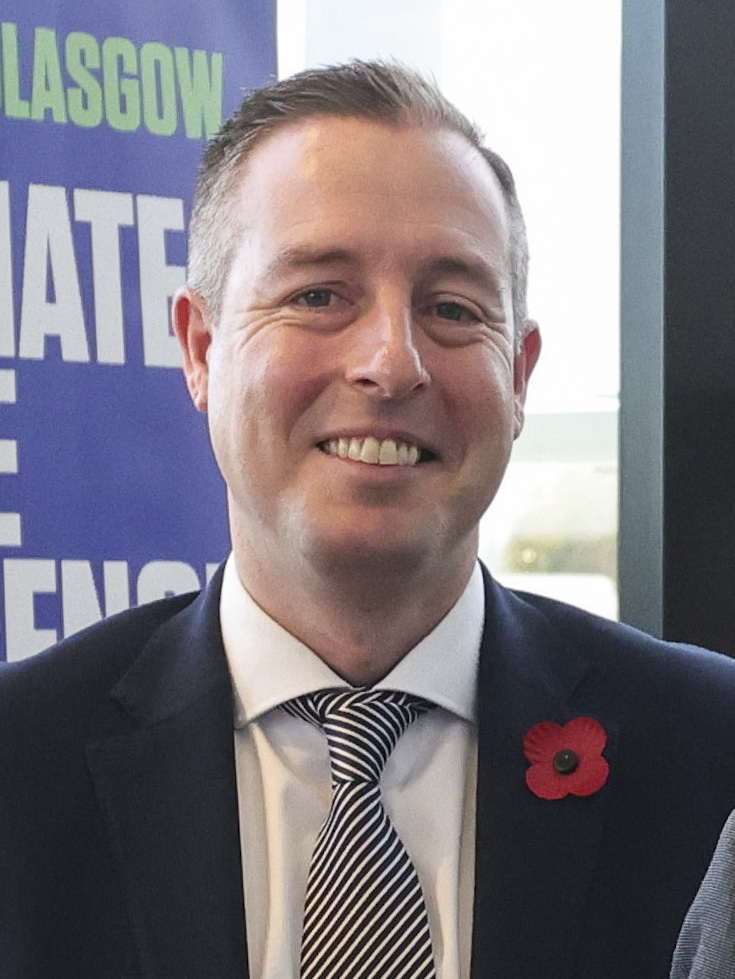
- Givan in 2021

Minister of Education
- Incumbent
- Assumed office 3 February 2024
- Preceded by: Michelle McIlveen (2022)

Member of the Legislative Assembly for Lagan Valley
- Incumbent
- Assumed office 14 June 2010
- Preceded by: Jeffrey Donaldson
Office history
First Minister of Northern Ireland
In office 17 June 2021 – 4 February 2022 Serving with Michelle O'Neill
Preceded by	Arlene Foster
Succeeded by	Michelle O'Neill (2024)
Minister for Communities
In office 25 May 2016 – 26 January 2017
Preceded by	Lord Morrow
Succeeded by	Deirdre Hargey (2020)
Committee history
Chair of the Committee for Justice
In office 14 January 2020 – 14 June 2021
Deputy	Linda Dillon
Preceded by	Paul Frew (2017)
Succeeded by	Mervyn Storey
In office 16 May 2011 – 19 December 2014
Deputy	Raymond McCartney
Preceded by	Lord Morrow
Succeeded by	Alastair Ross
Chair of the Committee of Standards and Privileges
In office 28 September 2015 – 30 March 2016
Deputy	Anna Lo
Preceded by	Jimmy Spratt
Succeeded by	Cathal Boylan

Member of Lisburn City Council
- In office 5 May 2005 – 22 May 2014
- Preceded by: William Lewis
- Succeeded by: Council abolished
- Constituency: Lisburn Town North

Personal details
- Born: Paul Jonathan Givan; 12 October 1981 (age 45) Lisburn, Northern Ireland
- Party: Democratic Unionist Party
- Spouse: Emma Givan
- Children: 3
- Education: University of Ulster
- Website: mydup.com/our-team/paul-givan

Paul Jonathan Givan (born 12 October 1981) is a Northern Irish unionist politician who served as First Minister of Northern Ireland from 2021 to 2022. A member of the Democratic Unionist Party (DUP), he has served as Minister of Education since 3 February 2024. Givan has been a Member of the Legislative Assembly for Lagan Valley since 2010.

Givan became First Minister on 17 June 2021, becoming the youngest person to hold that office. He resigned on 4 February 2022 as part of DUP protests against the Northern Ireland Protocol. From 2016 to 2017, Givan served as the Minister for Communities in the Northern Ireland Executive under First Minister Arlene Foster.

Givan has been associated with socially conservative views and has been described as being on the Paisleyite right wing of the DUP.

== Background ==
Givan was educated at Laurelhill Community College, where he studied Business and History, and is a graduate of the University of Ulster, where he obtained a degree in Business Studies and completed an Advanced Diploma in Management Practice. He was first elected to Lisburn City Council in 2005. His father, Alan Givan, was a prison officer with the Northern Ireland Prison Service (NIPS) who later became a DUP councillor in Lisburn.

Givan was born and raised in Lisburn. However, he is partially of County Monaghan descent, one section of his family having come from Ballybay in County Monaghan. Shortly after the Partition of Ireland in the early 1920s, this section of his family moved north from County Monaghan to County Tyrone. It was near Dungannon in South Tyrone that his paternal grandfather, Herbie Givan, was born and raised. Herbie later became one of the foundational members of the DUP.

== Political career ==
According to a 2014 article in the Belfast Telegraph, Givan's "first experience of 'real politics' came when he was 18", at which time he was part-time assistant in the constituency and Stormont offices of Edwin Poots. He was later to work as a special adviser when Poots was Minister of Culture, Arts and Leisure between 2007 and 2008, and then again between 2009 and 2010 when he was Minister of the Environment. Givan has stated that his interest in the DUP resulted from listening to Ian Paisley – at a rally against the Good Friday Agreement in Kilkeel. "He captured me emotionally for the DUP and Peter Robinson's and Nigel Dodds' forensic analysis of the failing of the Agreement captured me intellectually", he said.

Givan was first co-opted to the Northern Ireland Assembly in 2010, replacing Jeffrey Donaldson.

In May 2016, Givan was appointed Minister for Communities. As sports minister in November 2016, he visited a GAA club in Lisburn to award a grant and played Gaelic football with some child players of the club.

=== First Minister of Northern Ireland (2021–2022) ===
In May 2021, there was speculation that Givan, having worked for Edwin Poots previously, might be nominated to become First Minister of Northern Ireland after Poots was elected DUP leader. On 8 June 2021, Poots introduced Givan as "Northern Ireland's first minister designate". At age 39, Givan was the youngest First Minister in Northern Ireland's history.

On 17 June 2021, a letter from the DUP party chairman and other senior party members asked Poots to delay Givan's nomination as First Minister to oppose the British government's decision to introduce Irish language legislation in the Westminster Parliament. However, Poots nominated Givan as First Minister and Sinn Féin re-nominated Michelle O'Neill as deputy First Minister, restoring the Northern Ireland Executive. Prior to this nomination DUP officials objected to Givan being nominated for the role. As such, within hours of his being sworn in as First Minister, Givan's DUP colleagues convened a party meeting to oust Poots as the leader of the party. Poots resigned shortly after, triggering another leadership contest.

On 19 June it was reported Givan would be required to resign as First Minister once the next DUP leader had been chosen. However, in July, the Irish News said Givan was expected to remain in his position until "later this year" after the new DUP leader Jeffrey Donaldson said in a UTV interview that he intended to resign his seat as a Westminster MP and become First Minister before the planned 2022 Northern Ireland Assembly election, but also said that he did not yet know precisely how he would bring this about.

On 3 February 2022, Givan announced his resignation as First Minister, as part of DUP protests against the Northern Ireland Protocol. He became Northern Ireland's shortest serving First Minister, having spent 231 days in office. Givan retained his seat as an MLA for Lagan Valley in the 2022 Northern Ireland Assembly election.

=== Minister of Education (2024–present) ===
Givan was appointed Minister of Education following the formation of the Executive of the 7th Northern Ireland Assembly on 3 February 2024. He had previously been tipped for the role of deputy First Minister.

Following his appointment, on 8 February 2024, Givan set out his key priorities for education after visiting Rathmore Grammar School. He said he has "ambitious plans to invest in our schools’ estate..." He said he wanted the "gap to close" between wages for school staff in Northern Ireland and their counterparts in Great Britain. On 12 February 2024, in his first Ministerial statement in the assembly, he set out plans for capital investment across the education sector. Givan subsequently announced that new build projects for seven schools across Northern Ireland would progress in planning.

== Political views ==
In 2007, Givan made comments that characterised him as a creationist and was responsible for a motion calling for schools in Lisburn to teach creationist alternatives to evolution. The motion was passed by Lisburn City Council and asked all post-primary schools in the area what plans they had to "develop teaching material in relation to creation, intelligent design and other theories of origin". He is also opposed to abortion in Northern Ireland.

Givan supported Edwin Poots' successful bid to become leader of the Democratic Unionist Party in May 2021, alongside Mervyn Storey and Paul Frew.

== Controversies ==
=== Prostitution hearing (2014) ===
In 2014, a formal complaint was made by a sex worker, Laura Lee, over Givan's treatment of her after she had been invited to appear at a hearing to discuss proposed changes to prostitution legislation in Northern Ireland. He had asked her how much she charged, and said she was exploiting disabled people by not giving them discounts.

=== Freedom of Conscience Amendment Bill (2015) ===
In February 2015, Givan proposed a Northern Ireland Freedom of Conscience Amendment Bill, after controversy and legal action arose when Ashers Baking Company, a business owned by a religious family, refused to bake and decorate a cake with a message supportive of same-sex marriage. This motion led to a petition against the bill, which received 100,000 signatures in 48 hours. The Northern Ireland Human Rights Commission subsequently published an advisory noting that the "underlying premise" of the proposed bill (that "freedom to manifest one’s religion is undermined by the protection of individuals from discrimination") was unfounded, and that the Northern Ireland Assembly could not enact laws incompatible with existing conventions on human rights. In October 2018, the Supreme Court of the United Kingdom ruled that the refusal of service had not been discriminatory as it related to the customer's choice of order and not the customer's sexual orientation.

=== Irish language scheme (2016) ===
In December 2016, Givan cut funding for the Líofa scheme, which enabled people to go to the Donegal Gaeltacht to learn Irish. This decision prompted Gerry Adams to label him as an "ignoramus", and Martin McGuinness described the removal of the Bursary Scheme as "the straw that broke the camel's back" in his resignation speech from the role of deputy First Minister of Northern Ireland leading to a political crisis in the Stormont Executive. Givan later tweeted that the "decision on the Líofa Bursary Scheme was not a political decision. I have now identified the necessary funding to advance this scheme."

=== Visit to Israel (2025) ===
In late October 2025, Givan and several other unionist politicians travelled to Israel on a trip funded by the Israeli government. Givan's participation cost approximately £3,800, according to financial disclosures. Givan described the trip as a "fact-finding tour", and the Department of Education publicised his activities including a visit to Ofek School in West Jerusalem.

In the context of the Israeli invasion of Gaza and Gaza genocide, Givan's trip was condemned by nationalist and Alliance politicians, the Northern Ireland Teachers’ Council, and the Irish National Teachers' Organisation. Critics said that Givan should not have gone on the trip, and condemned his use of Department of Education channels to publicise it. The Department said that the trip was "not an official departmental trip", while Givan said that the publicisation of the trip on official channels was "strictly non-political". A petition calling for Givan's resignation received more than 14,000 signatures.

A motion of no-confidence in Givan was brought by People Before Profit MLA Gerry Carroll on 10 November. It received 47 votes (58.8%) in favour, being supported by People Before Profit, Sinn Féin, the SDLP, Alliance, and 33 (41.2%) against. However, the motion failed to pass due to lack of support from unionist parties, under the Assembly's requirement for cross-community support on certain issues. During discussion of the motion, Sinn Féin MLAs called Givan a "genocide denier", while Givan said the motion was driven by "a toxic mix of antisemitism, anti-unionism and hypocrisy". He described it as an attempted "political lynching" and "ideological purge".

Following the vote, Givan received an invitation from the Israeli government to make a second trip in 2026, which he declined.

Northern Ireland Assembly
Preceded by Jeffrey Donaldson	MLA for Lagan Valley; 2010–present	Incumbent
Political offices
Preceded by Lord Morrow	Minister for Communities; 2016–2017	Vacant Title next held by Deirdre Hargey
Preceded by Arlene Foster	First Minister of Northern Ireland; 2021–2022	Vacant Title next held by Michelle O'Neill
Vacant Title last held by Michelle McIlveen	Minister of Education; 2024–present	Incumbent
