= June 2021 Democratic Unionist Party leadership election =

Leadership election of the DUP, a Northern Irish political party

- 22 June 2021
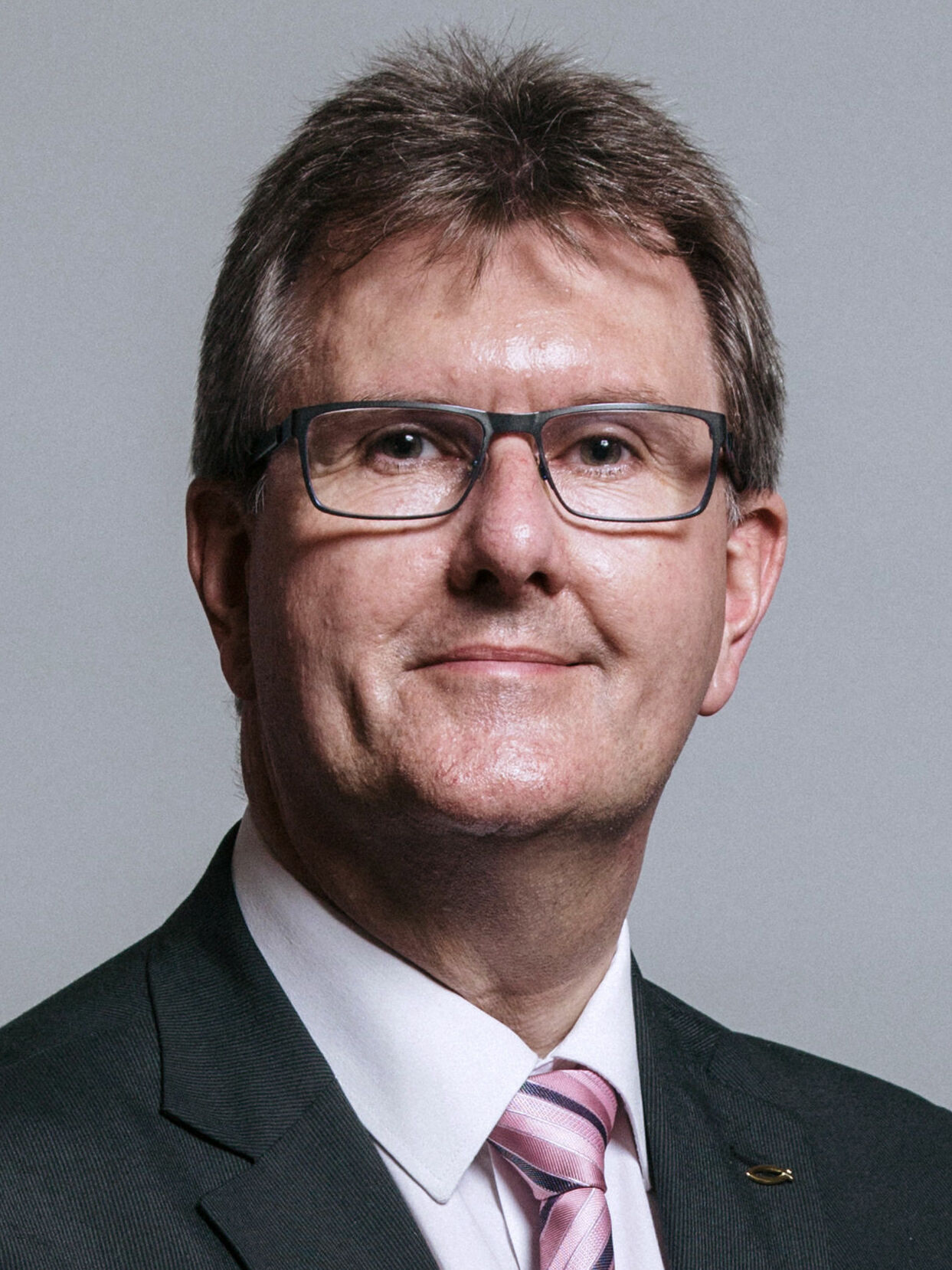
Candidate	Jeffrey Donaldson
Popular vote	Unopposed
Leader before election
Edwin Poots
Elected Leader
Jeffrey Donaldson

The June 2021 Democratic Unionist Party leadership election was triggered by Edwin Poots' resignation from the leadership of the party on 17 June 2021.

Poots released a statement on 17 June 2021 announcing his intention to resign as party leader and that he had requested a new leadership contest, and that he would remain in post until a successor was appointed. Party chair Maurice Morrow later announced that the leadership election would take place on 26 June 2021.

After nominations closed on 22 June, Sir Jeffrey Donaldson was declared the new leader of the Democratic Unionist Party after becoming the sole candidate, and therefore no ballot was held. On 30 June, the party's executive body ratified Donaldson as leader.

== Background ==
After agreeing to a deal that resolved the stalemate over the Irish Language Act, Poots stood down as leader on 17 June after a meeting where a majority of DUP MLAs and MPs voted against the party nominating Paul Givan to be First Minister.

On 18 June 2021, a senior DUP source told The Irish Times that Sir Jeffrey Donaldson was expected to be the only candidate, as there was "no appetite for another potentially damaging leadership election."

== Candidates ==
=== Declared ===
Candidate	Born	Political office	Announced	Source
Jeffrey Donaldson	7 December 1962; Kilkeel, Northern Ireland	Leader in the House of Commons (since 2019); MP for Lagan Valley (since 1997)	21 June 2021	

== Results ==
The election was scheduled to be held on 26 June 2021, however after nominations closed on 22 June at 12:00 BST, party chair Maurice Morrow revealed that Jeffrey Donaldson was the only candidate nominated. Following a meeting of the party's MPs and MLAs to confirm the result (with the backing of 32 out of 36 votes), the appointment of Donaldson as leader was ratified by the party executive on 26 June.

June 2021 Democratic Unionist Party leadership election
Candidate	Nominated by
Jeffrey Donaldson	Self-nominated
