= Democratic Unionist Party =

Political party in Northern Ireland

- Abbreviation: DUP
- Leader: Gavin Robinson
- Deputy Leader: Michelle McIlveen
- Chairman: The Lord Morrow
- Lords Leader: The Lord Dodds of Duncairn
- Secretary: Michelle McIlveen
- Founder: Ian Paisley
- Founded: 30 September 1971; 55 years ago
- Preceded by: Protestant Unionist Party
- Headquarters: 91 Dundela Avenue; Belfast; BT4 3BU
- Ideology: British unionism; British nationalism; Ulster loyalism; National conservatism; Social conservatism; Right-wing populism
- Political position: Right-wing
- Colours: Red; White; Navy blue Copper (customary)
- House of Commons (NI seats): 4 / 18
- House of Lords: 6 / 796
- NI Assembly: 26 / 90
- Councillors in Northern Ireland: 120 / 462
- Councils led in Northern Ireland: 2 / 11

Election symbol

Website
- mydup.com

The Democratic Unionist Party (DUP) is a unionist, loyalist, British nationalist and national conservative political party in Northern Ireland. It was founded in 1971 during the Troubles by Ian Paisley, who led the party until 2008. Led by Gavin Robinson, it is the second-largest party in the Northern Ireland Assembly, and won five seats in the House of Commons of the United Kingdom at the 2024 election. The party has been mostly described as right-wing and socially conservative, being anti-abortion and opposing same-sex marriage. The DUP sees itself as defending Britishness and Ulster Protestant culture against Irish nationalism and republicanism. It is also Eurosceptic and supported Brexit.

The DUP evolved from the Protestant Unionist Party and has historically strong links to the Free Presbyterian Church of Ulster, the church Paisley founded. During the Troubles, the DUP opposed sharing power with Irish nationalists or republicans as a means of resolving the conflict, and likewise rejected attempts to involve the Republic of Ireland in Northern Irish affairs. It campaigned against the Sunningdale Agreement of 1973, the Anglo-Irish Agreement of 1985, and the Good Friday Agreement of 1998. In the 1980s, the DUP was involved in setting up the loyalist paramilitary movements Third Force and Ulster Resistance, the latter of which helped smuggle a large shipment of weapons into Northern Ireland.

For the first three decades of the DUP's history, the Ulster Unionist Party was the largest unionist party in Northern Ireland; however, by 2004, the DUP had overtaken the UUP in terms of seats in both the Northern Ireland Assembly and the UK House of Commons. In 2006, the DUP co-signed the St Andrews Agreement and the following year agreed to enter into power-sharing devolved government with Sinn Féin, who agreed to support the Police Service, courts, and rule of law. Paisley became joint First Minister of Northern Ireland. However, the DUP's only Member of the European Parliament (MEP), Jim Allister, and seven DUP councillors left the party in protest, founding the Traditional Unionist Voice.

Ian Paisley was succeeded as DUP leader and First Minister by Peter Robinson (2008–2015), then by Arlene Foster (2015–2021). After Foster was ousted, Edwin Poots briefly became leader and nominated Paul Givan as First Minister, but was himself forced to step down after three weeks. In June 2021, he was succeeded by Jeffrey Donaldson. In protest against the Northern Ireland Protocol, Givan resigned as First Minister in February 2022, collapsing the Northern Ireland Executive. On 30 January 2024, Donaldson announced that the DUP had agreed a deal with the UK government that resulted in power-sharing being restored. Donaldson resigned as leader on 29 March 2024 after being charged with historical child sex offences, with the party's deputy leader, Gavin Robinson, being appointed as interim leader and later confirmed as party leader in May 2024.

== History ==
=== 1970s ===
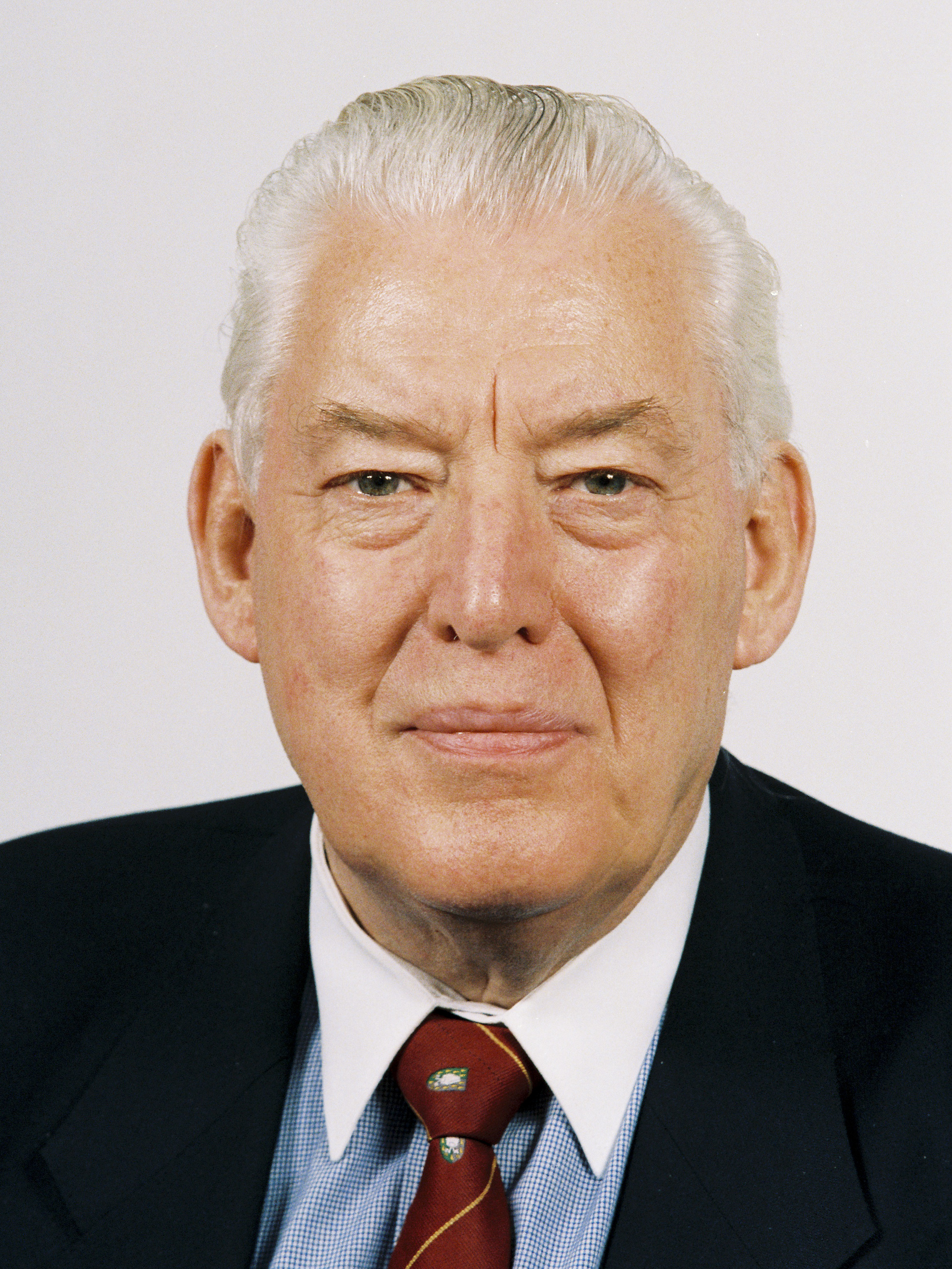
Ian Paisley, who founded the party and led it for 37 years

The Democratic Unionist Party evolved from the Protestant Unionist Party, which itself grew out of the Ulster Protestant Action movement. The DUP was founded on 30 September 1971 by Ian Paisley, leader of the Protestant Unionist Party, and Desmond Boal, formerly of the Ulster Unionist Party. Paisley, a well-known Protestant fundamentalist minister, was the founder and leader of the Free Presbyterian Church of Ulster. He would lead both the DUP and the Free Presbyterian Church for the next 37 years, and his party and church would be closely linked. When the DUP formed, Northern Ireland was in the midst of an ethnic-nationalist conflict known as the Troubles, which began in 1969 and would last for the next thirty years. The conflict began amid a campaign to end discrimination against the Catholic/Irish nationalist minority by the Protestant/unionist government and police force. This protest campaign was opposed, often violently, by unionists who viewed it as an Irish republican front. Paisley had led the unionist opposition to the civil rights movement. The DUP were more hardline or loyalist than the UUP and its founding arguably stemmed from worries of the Ulster Protestant working class that the UUP was not paying them enough heed.

The DUP opposed the Sunningdale Agreement of 1973. The Agreement was an attempt to resolve the conflict by setting up a new assembly and government for Northern Ireland in which unionists and Irish nationalists would share power. The Agreement also proposed the creation of a Council of Ireland, which would facilitate co-operation between the governments of Northern Ireland and the Republic of Ireland. The DUP won eight seats in the 1973 election to the Assembly. Along with other anti-Agreement unionists, the DUP formed the United Ulster Unionist Council (UUUC) to oppose the Agreement. In the February 1974 UK election, the UUUC won 11 out of 12 Northern Ireland seats, while the pro-Agreement unionists failed to win any. On 15 May 1974, anti-Agreement unionists called a general strike aimed at bringing down the Agreement. The strike coordinating committee included DUP leader Paisley, the other UUUC leaders, and the leaders of the loyalist paramilitary groups. The strike lasted fourteen days and brought Northern Ireland to a standstill. Loyalist paramilitaries helped enforce the strike by blocking roads and intimidating workers. On the third day of the strike, loyalists detonated four car bombs in Dublin and Monaghan, killing 33 civilians. The strike led to the downfall of the Agreement on 28 May.

Following the downfall of the Agreement, in 1975 the British government set up a Constitutional Convention, an elected body of unionists and nationalists which would seek agreement on a political settlement for Northern Ireland. In the election to the convention, the UUUC (which included the DUP) won 53% of the vote. The UUUC opposed a power-sharing government and recommended only a return to majority rule (i.e. unionist rule). As this was unacceptable to nationalists, the convention was dissolved.

The DUP opposed UK membership of the European Economic Community (EEC). In June 1979, in the first election to the European Parliament, Paisley won one of the three Northern Ireland seats. He topped the poll, with 29.8% of the first preference votes. He retained that seat in every European election until 2004, when he was replaced by Jim Allister, who resigned from the DUP in 2007 while retaining his seat.

=== 1980s and 1990s ===
During 1981, the DUP opposed the then-ongoing talks between British Prime Minister Margaret Thatcher and Taoiseach Charles Haughey. That year, Paisley and other DUP members attempted to create a Protestant loyalist volunteer militia—called the (Ulster) Third Force—which would work alongside the police and army to fight the Irish Republican Army (IRA). They organized large rallies where men were photographed in military formation waving firearms certificates. Paisley declared: "This is a small token of the men who are placed to devastate any attempt by Margaret Thatcher and Charles Haughey to destroy the Union". The DUP helped organize a loyalist 'Day of Action' on 23 November 1981, to pressure the British government to take a harder line against the IRA. Paisley addressed a Third Force rally in Newtownards, where thousands of masked and uniformed men marched before him. He declared: "My men are ready to be recruited under the crown to destroy the vermin of the IRA. But if they refuse to recruit them, then we will have no other decision to make but to destroy the IRA ourselves!" In December, Paisley claimed that the Third Force had 15,000–20,000 members. James Prior, Secretary of State for Northern Ireland, replied that private armies would not be tolerated.

The Anglo-Irish Agreement was signed by the British and Irish governments in November 1985, following months of talks between the two. The Agreement confirmed there would be no change in the status of Northern Ireland without the consent of a majority of its citizens, and proposed the creation of a new power-sharing government. It also gave the Irish government an advisory role on some matters in Northern Ireland. Both the DUP and UUP mounted a major protest campaign against the Agreement, dubbed "Ulster Says No". Both unionist parties resigned their seats in the British House of Commons, suspended district council meetings, and led a campaign of mass civil disobedience. There were strikes and mass protest rallies.

On 23 June 1986, DUP politicians occupied the Stormont Parliament Building in protest at the Agreement, while 200 supporters protested outside and clashed with police. The DUP politicians were forcibly removed by police the next day. On 10 July, Paisley and deputy DUP leader Peter Robinson led 4,000 loyalist supporters in a protest in which they 'occupied' the town of Hillsborough. Hillsborough Castle is where the Agreement had been signed. On 7 August, Robinson led hundreds of loyalist supporters in an invasion of the village of Clontibret, in the Republic of Ireland. The loyalists marched up and down the main street, vandalised property, and attacked two Irish police officers (Gardaí) before fleeing back over the border. Robinson was arrested and convicted for unlawful assembly.

On 10 November 1986, a rally was held in which DUP politicians Paisley, Robinson and Ivan Foster announced the formation of the Ulster Resistance Movement (URM). This was a loyalist paramilitary group whose purpose was to "take direct action as and when required" to bring down the Agreement and defeat republicanism. Recruitment rallies were held in towns across Northern Ireland and thousands were said to have joined. The following year, the URM helped smuggle a large shipment of weapons into Northern Ireland, which were shared out between the URM, the Ulster Volunteer Force (UVF) and the Ulster Defence Association (UDA). Most, but not all, of the weaponry was seized by police in 1988. In 1989, URM members attempted to trade Shorts' missile blueprints for weapons from the apartheid South African regime. Following these revelations, the DUP said that it had cut its links with the URM in 1987.

In the mid-1980s, the Irish republican party Sinn Féin began to contest and win seats in local council elections. In response, the DUP fought elections under the slogan "Smash Sinn Féin" and vowed to exclude Sinn Féin councillors from all council business. Their 1985 manifesto said "The Sinn Féiners must be ostracised and isolated" at all local government bodies. Throughout the 1980s and 1990s, DUP councillors attempted to exclude Sinn Féin councillors by ignoring them, boycotting their speeches, or drowning them out by making as much noise as possible – such as by heckling and banging tables.

In early January 1994, the UDA released a document calling for the repartition of Ireland with the goal of making Northern Ireland wholly Protestant. The plan was to be implemented should the British Army withdraw from Northern Ireland. The Irish Catholic/nationalist-majority areas would be handed over to the Republic, and those left in the rump state would be "expelled, nullified, or interned". DUP press officer Sammy Wilson spoke positively of the document, calling it a "valuable return to reality" and lauded the UDA for "contemplating what needs to be done to maintain our separate Ulster identity".

=== 1998–2004 ===
During the Northern Ireland peace process of the 1990s, the DUP was initially involved in the negotiations under former United States Senator George J. Mitchell that led to the Good Friday Agreement of 1998, but withdrew in protest when Sinn Féin, an Irish republican party with links to the Provisional Irish Republican Army (IRA), was allowed to participate while the IRA kept its weapons. The DUP opposed the Agreement in the Good Friday Agreement referendum, in which the Agreement was approved with 71.1% of the electorate in favour.

The DUP's opposition was based on a number of reasons, including:

- The early release of paramilitary prisoners
- The mechanism to allow Sinn Féin to hold government office despite ongoing IRA activity
- The lack of accountability of ministers in the Northern Ireland Executive
- The lack of accountability of the North/South Ministerial Council and North/South Implementation Bodies

The DUP contested the 1998 Northern Ireland Assembly election that resulted from the Good Friday Agreement, winning 20 seats, the third-highest of any party. It then took up two of the ten seats in the multi-party power-sharing Executive. While serving as ministers, they refused to sit at meetings of the executive committee in protest at Sinn Féin's participation. The Executive ultimately collapsed over an alleged IRA espionage ring at Stormont (see Stormontgate).

The Good Friday Agreement relied on the support of a majority of unionists and a majority of nationalists in order for it to operate. During the 2003 Northern Ireland Assembly election, the DUP argued for a "fair deal" that could command the support of both unionists and nationalists. After the results of this election the DUP argued that support was no longer present within unionism for the Good Friday Agreement. They went on to publish their proposals for devolution in Ireland entitled Devolution Now. These proposals have been refined and re-stated in further policy documents including Moving on and Facing Reality.

In the 2003 Northern Ireland Assembly election, the DUP won 30 seats, the most of any party. In January 2004, it became the largest Northern Ireland party at Westminster, when MP Jeffrey Donaldson joined after defecting from the UUP. In December 2004, English MP Andrew Hunter took the DUP whip after earlier withdrawing from the Conservative Party, giving the party seven seats, in comparison to the UUP's five, Sinn Féin's four, and the Social Democratic and Labour Party's (SDLP) three.

=== 2005–2007 ===
In the 2005 UK general election, the party reinforced its position as the largest unionist party, winning nine seats, making it the fourth largest party in terms of seats in the British House of Commons behind Labour, the Conservatives and the Liberal Democrats. In terms of votes, the DUP was the fourth largest party on the island of Ireland.

At the local government election of 2005, the DUP emerged as the largest party at local government level with 182 councillors across Northern Ireland's 26 district councils. The DUP had a majority of the members on Castlereagh Borough Council, which had long been a DUP stronghold and was home to party leader Peter Robinson, also in Ballymena Borough Council, home to the party's founder Ian Paisley, and finally Ards Borough Council. As well as outright control on these councils, the DUP was also the largest party in eight other councils – Antrim Borough Council, Ballymoney Borough Council, Banbridge District Council, Belfast City Council, Carrickfergus Borough Council, Coleraine Borough Council, Craigavon Borough Council and Newtownabbey Borough Council.

On 11 April 2006, it was announced that three DUP members were to be elevated to the House of Lords: Maurice Morrow, Wallace Browne, the former Lord Mayor of Belfast, and Eileen Paisley, a vice-president of the DUP and wife of DUP Leader Ian Paisley. None, however, sit as DUP peers.

On 27 October 2006, the DUP issued a four-page letter in the Belfast Telegraph newspaper asking "Are the terms of Saint Andrew's a basis of moving forward to devolution?", with responses to be received to its party headquarters by 8 November. It was part of the party's policy of consultation with its electorate before entering a power-sharing government.

On 24 November 2006, Ian Paisley refused to nominate himself as First Minister of Northern Ireland designate. There was confusion between all parties whether he actually said that if Sinn Féin supported policing and the rule of law that he would nominate himself on 28 March 2007 after the Assembly elections on 7 March 2007. The Assembly meeting was brought to an abrupt end when the building had to be evacuated because of a security breach. Paisley later released a statement through the press office stating that he did in fact imply that if Sinn Féin supported policing and the rule of law, he would go into a power-sharing government with them. This was following a statement issued by 12 DUP MLAs stating that what Ian Paisley had said in the chamber could not be interpreted as a nomination.

In February 2007, the DUP suggested that it would begin to impose fines up to £20,000 on members disobeying the party whip on crucial votes. On 24 March 2007 the DUP party executive overwhelmingly endorsed a resolution put to them by the party officers that did not agree to an establishment of devolution and an executive in Northern Ireland by the Government's deadline of 26 March, but did agree to setting up an executive on 8 May 2007.

On 27 March 2007, the party's sole Member of the European Parliament (MEP), Jim Allister, resigned from the party, in opposition to the decision to enter a power-sharing government with Sinn Féin. He retained his seat as an independent MEP as leader of his new hard-line anti-St Andrews Agreement splinter group that he formed with other disaffected members who had left the DUP over the issue, Traditional Unionist Voice, a seat which he retained until Diane Dodds won the seat back for the DUP in 2009. MP Gregory Campbell warned on 6 April 2007 that his party would be watching to see if benefits flow from its agreement to share power with Sinn Féin.

=== Robinson leadership (2008–2015) ===
On 31 May 2008, the party's central Executive Committee met at the offices of Castlereagh Borough Council where Ian Paisley formally stepped down as party leader and Peter Robinson was ratified as the new leader, with Nigel Dodds as his deputy.

On 11 June 2008, the party supported the government's proposal to detain terrorist suspects for up to 42 days as part of the Counter-Terrorism Bill, leading The Independent newspaper to dub all of the party's nine MPs as part of "Brown's dirty dozen". The Times reported that the party had been given "sweeteners for Northern Ireland" and "a peerage for the Rev Ian Paisley", amongst other offers, to secure the bill.

Members of the DUP were lambasted by the press and voters, after MPs' expenses reports were leaked to the media. Several newspapers including the Daily Mail and Daily Mirror, referred to the "Swish Family Robinson" after Peter Robinson, and his wife Iris, claimed £571,939.41 in expenses with a further £150,000 being paid to family members. Further embarrassment was caused to the party when its deputy leader, Nigel Dodds, had the highest expenses claims of any Northern Ireland MP, ranking 13th highest out of all UK MPs. Details of all MPs' expenses claims since 2004 were published in July 2009 under the Freedom of Information Act 2000.

In January 2010, Peter Robinson was at the centre of a high-profile scandal relating to his 60-year-old MP/MLA wife Iris Robinson's infidelity with a 19-year-old man, and alleged serious financial irregularities associated with the scandal.

In the 2010 general election, the party suffered a major upset when its leader, Peter Robinson, lost his Belfast East seat to Naomi Long of the APNI on a swing of 22.9%. However, the party maintained its position elsewhere, fighting off a challenge from the Ulster Conservatives and Unionists – New Force in Antrim South and Strangford and from Jim Allister's Traditional Unionist Voice in Antrim North.

The DUP were strongly criticised after the Red Sky scandal in which DUP ministers attempted to influence a decision at a meeting of the Northern Ireland Housing Executive. The decision related to an £8 million contract of east Belfast firm Red Sky. The Housing Executive cancelled Red Sky's contract after a BBC Spotlight investigation into the company, which was shown to be overcharging taxpayers. The DUP cited "sectarian bias" in relation to the decision. The party suspended DUP councillor Jenny Palmer, who sat on the executive board, after she confessed that DUP special adviser Stephen Brimstone pressured her into changing her vote at the meeting.

In the 2015 general election, when the result was expected to be a hung parliament, the issue of DUP and the UK Independence Party forming a coalition government with the UK Conservative Party was considered by Nigel Farage (leader of UKIP). The then Deputy Prime Minister and leader of the Liberal Democrats, Nick Clegg, warned against this "Blukip" coalition, with a spoof website highlighting imagined policies from this coalition – such as reinstating the death penalty, scrapping all benefits for under 25s and charging for hospital visits. Additionally, issues were raised about the continued existence of the BBC (as the DUP, UKIP and Conservatives had made a number of statements criticising the institution) and support for same-sex marriage. However, in an interview with BBC Radio 5 Live deputy leader of the DUP Nigel Dodds told BBC Newsline that the DUP was "against discrimination based on religion ... or sexual orientation".

On 10 September 2015, Peter Robinson stepped aside as First Minister and other DUP ministers, with the exception of Arlene Foster, resigned their portfolios.

=== Foster leadership (2015–2021) ===
Arlene Foster became leader of the DUP on 17 December 2015, and served as First Minister of Northern Ireland from January 2016 to January 2017.

Two days before the UK Brexit referendum, held on 23 June 2016, the DUP paid £282,000 for a four-page glossy wrap-around to the free newspaper Metro, which is distributed in major towns and cities in Britain, but not Northern Ireland, advocating a 'Leave' vote.

On 4 October 2016, First Minister Arlene Foster and DUP MPs held a champagne reception at the Conservative Party conference, marking what some have described as an "informal coalition" or an "understanding" between the two parties to account for the Conservatives' narrow majority in the House of Commons. The relationship between the parties was formalised after the 2017 United Kingdom general election with the signing of the Conservative–DUP agreement. In October 2017, the DUP held a similar reception at the Conservative Party conference, which was attended by leading Conservative figures including First Secretary of State Damian Green, Brexit Secretary David Davis, then-Chief Whip Gavin Williamson, and party chairman Patrick McLoughlin. This was reciprocated in November, when Damian Green and Conservative Chief Whip Julian Smith attended the DUP's conference, with Smith giving a keynote address. The third such annual DUP reception at the Conservative conference took place in October 2018, with Chancellor of the Exchequer Philip Hammond and former Foreign Secretary Boris Johnson addressing the DUP conference a month later. Prominent Conservative MPs such as Environment Secretary Michael Gove, Leader of the House of Commons Andrea Leadsom, Defence Secretary Gavin Williamson, former International Development Secretary Priti Patel, Sports Minister Tracey Crouch, Defence Select Committee chair Julian Lewis, and European Research Group chair Jacob Rees-Mogg headlined various fundraising events for the DUP from 2017 onwards.

Former UK Independence Party leader Nigel Farage also spoke at a DUP fundraiser in May 2018, with his main financial backer, Arron Banks, stating that he would support a bid by Farage to seek office as a DUP candidate after the end of his tenure as Member of the European Parliament in 2019.

In her capacity as Minister of Enterprise, Trade and Investment in 2012, Foster oversaw the establishment of a green energy scheme, which led to the Renewable Heat Incentive scandal (RHI scandal). The scheme gave a perverse incentive to use more energy and increase their carbon footprint to those who signed up to it since they could claim £1.60 for every £1 spent on heating with, for example, wood pellets. With no cost controls, it could cost the public purse up to £490 million.

Foster refused calls to step down as First Minister over her alleged role in the RHI scandal. In January 2017 this led Martin McGuinness to resign in protest and the Northern Ireland Executive collapsed. A snap election followed after Sinn Féin refused to re-nominate a deputy First Minister. In this Northern Ireland Assembly election, held in March 2017, the DUP lost 10 seats, leaving them only one seat and 1,200 votes ahead of Sinn Féin, a result described by the Belfast Telegraph as "catastrophic". The withdrawal of the party whip from Jim Wells in May 2018 left the DUP on 27 seats, the same number as Sinn Féin.

In the 2017 UK general election, the DUP had 10 seats overall, three seats ahead of Sinn Féin. With no party having received an outright majority in the UK Parliament, the DUP entered into an agreement to support government by the Conservative Party. A DUP source said: "The alternative is intolerable. For as long as Corbyn leads Labour, we will ensure there's a Tory PM." The DUP would later withdraw their support over new Prime Minister Boris Johnson's revised proposal for a deal with the EU.

At the 2019 UK general election, the DUP lost vote share and lost two of its seats.

Due to the RHI scandal and deadlock between the DUP and Sinn Féin, Northern Ireland did not have an Executive and the Assembly did not meet for three years. In January 2020, the main parties signed the New Decade, New Approach agreement and the Executive was re-formed with Foster as First Minister and Michelle O'Neill of Sinn Féin as deputy First Minister.

In April 2021, it was reported that the majority of DUP MLAs and MPs had signed a letter of no confidence in Foster. She therefore announced that she would step down as DUP leader in May and as First Minister in June.

=== Poots leadership (2021) ===
After Foster's announcement, the DUP held its first ever leadership election in May 2021, with Edwin Poots becoming leader after narrowly defeating Jeffrey Donaldson. This caused a fracture in the party. Some DUP members spoke of their "disgust" at the way in which Foster had been ousted. There were claims that Poots supporters engaged in bullying and intimidation during the leadership election, and some party members walked out before his speech. Police also investigated claims the Ulster Defence Association (UDA) threatened members of Donaldson's campaign team. Poots admitted party members were "bruised" but denied claims of intimidation. Several party members resigned, including councillors.

On 17 June, 21 days after becoming DUP leader, Poots announced he would be resigning after an internal party revolt. He said he would stay in post until a successor was elected. He had agreed a deal whereby his close ally, Paul Givan, would become First Minister. In return, he would let Westminster pass Irish language law for Northern Ireland, which the DUP had earlier agreed to implement by signing the New Decade, New Approach agreement. Most DUP MLAs opposed Poots's decision, forcing him to step down.

On 22 June, Jeffrey Donaldson was confirmed to be succeeding Poots, as the only candidate in the leadership contest.

=== Donaldson leadership (2021–2024) ===
Jeffrey Donaldson was ratified as DUP leader on 30 June 2021, and said his top priority was to get rid of the Northern Ireland Protocol, the post-Brexit trade arrangements. Hours after he became leader, MLA Alex Easton left the DUP, saying the party no longer had any "respect, discipline or decency". This meant the DUP were no longer the biggest party in the Assembly.

As part of the party's protest against the Northern Ireland Protocol, the DUP's Paul Givan resigned as First Minister in February 2022, collapsing the Northern Ireland Executive.

In April, shortly before the 2022 Assembly election, all of the DUP's officers in South Down refused to endorse the party's candidate Diane Forsythe and resigned from the DUP.

In the May 2022 Assembly election, the DUP's vote share dropped almost 7% and it lost three seats, making Sinn Féin the largest party for the first time. However, the DUP said they will not allow the election of a Speaker until their issues with the Northern Ireland Protocol are dealt with; meaning the Assembly cannot continue its business and a new Executive cannot be formed. The DUP were condemned by other parties for their actions.

In July 2022, the DUP voted to support Prime Minister Boris Johnson in a confidence vote, making it the only party besides the Conservative Party to do so.

Since the May 2022 election, the DUP has blocked the formation of a new Northern Ireland Assembly and Executive.

Following the publication of the Windsor Framework, the DUP signalled opposition to the agreement. The party formed a panel to form a report on the plan, members included; Arlene Foster, Peter Robinson, Carla Lockhart, Lord Weir, Ross Reed, John McBurney, Brian Kingston and Deborah Erskine. David Kerr, the former UUP adviser to former First Minister David Trimble, has warned that DUP leadership risks splitting the party over its continued opposition to power sharing.

In the 2023 Northern Ireland local elections, the DUP was overtaken by the Sinn Féin as the largest party. While the DUP maintained its 122 seats, Sinn Féin was able to win 39 new seats to jump to 144 seats. After the election, Chris Heaton-Harris called for the party to end the boycott of Sinn Féin and work alongside the party.

During Donaldson's leadership, the DUP has developed a five-point plan "to build a better Northern Ireland within the Union". This includes "supporting and boosting [the] National Health Service, growing [the] economy and creating jobs, tackling the cost of living crisis, securing a better education system and negotiating the removal of the Irish Sea Border."

On 29 January 2024, an urgent meeting of the DUP executive was called following the passing over the deadline to restore power sharing at Stormont. Details of the meeting were reportedly leaked to the BBC. Jeffrey Donaldson revealed in the morning that his party would return to Stormont. The Northern Ireland Executive formation ended 23 months of stalemate.

Donaldson resigned as leader on 29 March 2024 after being charged with historical sex offences. Gavin Robinson was named as interim leader.

=== Robinson leadership (2024–present) ===
On 29 May 2024, Gavin Robinson was confirmed as leader of the party by its executive - a role he had held on an interim basis since 29 March 2024.

In the 2024 United Kingdom general election, the DUP lost three seats in Lagan Valley, North Antrim and South Antrim. This saw Sinn Féin elect the highest number of MPs in Northern Ireland with seven.

== Policies and views ==
=== Unionism ===
The Democratic Unionist Party are Ulster unionists, which means that they support Northern Ireland remaining part of the United Kingdom and are opposed to a united Ireland. The party sees itself as defending Britishness and Ulster Protestant culture against Irish nationalism and republicanism. It supports marching rights for the loyalist Orange Order, which many DUP members are members of; it is also in favour of flying the British Union Flag from government buildings all year round. The DUP assert that "Irish and Gaelic culture should not be allowed to dominate funding" in Northern Ireland and have blocked proposed laws that would promote and protect the Irish language. The DUP are staunch supporters of the British security forces and their role in the Northern Ireland conflict. The party wants to prevent British soldiers and police officers from being prosecuted for killings committed during the conflict.

=== Ulster loyalism ===
The party has also been described as right-wing populist and containing some extremist tendencies. It is linked to the Ulster loyalist faction of unionism, which has been identified as a form of ethnic nationalism. The DUP was endorsed in the 2017 general election by the Loyalist Communities Council, an umbrella group of loyalist paramilitary groups, which are proscribed terrorist organisations. However, the party leadership strongly rejected the endorsement, with party leader Arlene Foster stating: "We did not seek that statement, we did not seek endorsement from any paramilitary organisation and indeed I fundamentally reject an endorsement from anyone that's involved with paramilitarism or criminality."

=== Euroscepticism and foreign policy ===
The DUP is a Eurosceptic party that supported the UK's withdrawal from the European Union in the 2016 Brexit referendum and was the only party in the Stormont power executive to campaign for leave. The party opposes a hard Irish border, and wishes to maintain the Common Travel Area.

Speaking as a member of the European Parliament in 1991, then leader Ian Paisley set out the DUP's Eurosceptic position:

I wish to have no part whatsoever in the rebuilding of this Tower of Babel. God Almighty cursed and confounded that tower very long ago and no sensible person wants to make bricks without straw to rebuild such a monstrosity. I believe there is a way forward for Europe. The true future of the nations of Europe lies in co-operation and not in incorporation; in unity, but not in uniformity; in national sovereignty, not in international submergence, and in a family of nations, not in a federation of nations.

Later in 1991, speaking at the DUP annual conference Paisley compared Chancellor of Germany Helmut Kohl to Kaiser Wilhelm II and Adolf Hitler.

East Antrim MP Sammy Wilson caused controversy in March 2016 during a BBC Spotlight episode discussing the implications of the EU referendum, when he was recorded agreeing with a member of the public who said that they wanted to leave the European Union and "get the ethnics out". Wilson stated "You are absolutely right". Wilson said he was agreeing with the desire to leave the European Union, not the "ethnics out" call. Wilson was criticised by the Polish consul in Northern Ireland and various other political parties.

The DUP strongly opposed the Northern Ireland backstop in 2019 seeing it as weakening Northern Ireland's place within the United Kingdom, and this opposition was regarded by a number of commentators as the main reason why the withdrawal agreement was not ratified by the Parliament of the United Kingdom before 2020. During most of the May government, the DUP said the Northern Ireland backstop must be removed from the Brexit withdrawal agreement for continued support of Theresa May's government in the House of Commons through the confidence and supply deal, although the party said that it was open to a time limit on the backstop.

The DUP voted "No" in all three meaningful votes on the EU Withdrawal Agreement negotiated by Theresa May.

In 2011, the DUP abstained on military intervention in Libya. The DUP opposed the British government's proposed military intervention against Bashar al-Assad in the Syrian Civil War in 2013. However, the DUP supported military action against Islamic State targets in Syria in 2015.

As of 2017, the DUP were strongly supportive of Israel.

=== LGBT issues ===
The DUP is socially conservative and has strong links to the Free Presbyterian Church of Ulster, the small church founded by the party's founder Ian Paisley. The vast majority of DUP members are evangelical Christians and, on average, 65% of its representatives since the party was founded have been Free Presbyterians. The party also has links with the Caleb Foundation, a Protestant fundamentalist pressure group.

The DUP has opposed LGBT rights in Northern Ireland. Party leaders—as well as many prominent party members—have condemned homosexuality, and a 2014 survey found that two-thirds of party members believed homosexuality was wrong.

==== Opposition to LGBT rights legislation ====
The DUP campaigned against the legalisation of homosexual acts, which it believed to be a "harmful deviance" linked to paedophilia, in Northern Ireland through the "Save Ulster from Sodomy" campaign between 1977 and 1982.

The Labour government elected in 1997 sought to reform the law to extend LGBT rights. The DUP consistently voted against the Labour government, including by voting against reducing of the age of consent for gay sex from 18 to 16 in June 1998 (and again in February 2000), against a motion for a gender-neutral Civil Registration Bill in October 2001, against allowing unmarried gay and straight couples to adopt children in November 2002, against the Gender Recognition Bill 2004, against the Civil Partnership Act 2004, for an amendment opposing the Equality Act (Sexual Orientation) Regulations 2007, and against same-sex female couples and single mothers accessing in vitro fertilisation in January 2008.

The party vetoed the legalisation of same-sex marriage in Northern Ireland from 2015 onwards, which for a time made Northern Ireland the only region of the UK where same-sex marriage was not permitted, prior to the passage of the Northern Ireland (Executive Formation etc) Act 2019. Former DUP minister Jim Wells called the issue a "red line" for power-sharing talks, adding that "Peter will not marry Paul in Northern Ireland". In August 2012, in the wake of a council debate on same-sex marriage, Magherafelt DUP councillor Paul McClean called for homosexuality to be made illegal again in Northern Ireland. In response, the DUP reiterated their support for the "current definition of marriage", but did not comment with regard to outlawing homosexuality. McClean repeated his comments in April 2015, and a few days later, DUP leader Peter Robinson said that McClean was "entitled to that opinion", and that if homosexuality was illegal, he would "hope that people would obey the law".

The party attempted to introduce a "conscience clause" into law in Northern Ireland, which would let businesses refuse to provide a service if it went against their religious beliefs. This came after a Christian-owned bakery was taken to court for refusing to make a cake bearing a pro-gay marriage slogan. Opponents argued that the clause would allow discrimination against LGBT people.

==== Homosexuality 'cure' and conversion therapy comments ====
In June 2008, Iris Robinson, commenting on a homophobic assault, offered to refer homosexuals to psychiatric counselling, suggesting it could "cure" him of his homosexuality. Although she condemned the attack, she called homosexuality an "abomination" that made her feel "sick" and "nauseous". In July, Robinson stated in Parliament that homosexuality was "viler" than child sex abuse, adding she felt "totally repulsed by both". In a subsequent statement that same day, however, she said that she had "clearly intended to say that child abuse was even worse than homosexuality and sodomy". Her remarks were widely condemned by other parties and by the Northern Ireland Gay Rights Association, with SDLP MP Alasdair McDonnell saying her comments "create space for all sorts of homophobic attacks".

In November 2015, the DUP deputy mayor of Derry and Strabane, Thomas Kerrigan, suggested that homosexuality could be "cured" through prayer, suggesting that young people not attending church left themselves open to lifestyles such as "being gay", drinking, or taking drugs. Kerrigan's remarks attracted condemnation from the Rainbow Project and from Bebe Johnston, the mother of a gay man from Derry who died by suicide. While the DUP indicated Kerrigan's remarks were not party policy, they stated "party members may hold personal views on this matter".

==== Internal dissent on LGBT issues ====
In recent years, the party has become more split on the issue of LGBT rights with some DUP members moderating their opinions on the matter. In 2021, The Guardian claimed that Arlene Foster softening her stance on LGBT issues was a contributing factor in her resignation as leader. In July 2021, deputy leader Paula Bradley expressed an apology for the "absolutely atrocious" statements made by the party's politicians about LGBT people and added "there have been some very hurtful comments and some language that really should not have been used.". Her apology was supported by DUP leader Jeffrey Donaldson. In September 2021, Donaldson met with the Rainbow Project, the first official meeting between a DUP leader and an LGBT group.

However, the efforts of leading DUP figures to moderate the party's position has faced resistance. In 2019, following the selection of Alison Bennington, the DUP's first openly LGBT candidate (who would later be elected as a councillor), Ballymoney DUP alderman John Finlay issued a complaint to DUP party officers, stating his "deep concern" at "the decision to select an openly gay candidate", remarking that "Dr. Paisley must be turning in his grave".

=== Abortion ===
The DUP oppose abortion and have opposed any extension of abortion rights in Northern Ireland, as well as opposing extra funding for international family planning programmes. In 2000, the DUP proposed a motion opposing the extension of the Abortion Act 1967 to Northern Ireland. In 2014, DUP MLA Jim Wells proposed an unsuccessful amendment to "restrict lawful abortions to NHS premises, except in cases of urgency when access to NHS premises is not possible and where no fee is paid". Later serving as Health Minister, Jim Wells opposed legalising abortion in cases of rape, arguing that "there are hundreds of married couples who would love to adopt children, a child, a baby, and who could give support in that situation".

In 2019, Westminster passed the Northern Ireland (Executive Formation etc) Act, which automatically decriminalised abortion after the Northern Ireland Assembly was not restored by the established deadline of 21 October 2019. The DUP slammed this move as "undermining" devolution, with party leader Arlene Foster terming Westminster's efforts "insidious". In 2021, First Minister Paul Givan said he was prepared to go to court to resist a government order forcing Stormont to commission abortion services in Northern Ireland.

In 2021, DUP proposed legislation to restrict abortion access in cases of non-fatal disabilities was ruled incompatible with the UK's obligations under the United Nations Convention on the Elimination of All Forms of Discrimination Against Women by the Northern Ireland Human Rights Commission.

=== Economic and fiscal policies ===
The DUP is in favour of keeping the "triple lock" for pensions, the Winter Fuel Allowance, and greater spending in Northern Ireland for services such as health.

The DUP revived calls for a 25-mile sea bridge to link Northern Ireland with Scotland.

To address the cost of living crisis, in the May 2022 Assembly Election the DUP supported a windfall tax on energy firms, and an energy support payment "to support hard-pressed families."

The party has been described as "a right-wing party in terms of social issues, but left-of-centre on economic issues."

=== Social policy ===
Some DUP politicians have called for creationism to be taught in state schools, and for museums to include creationism in their exhibits. In 2007, a DUP spokesman confirmed that these views were in line with party policy.

In 2011, the DUP called for a debate in the House of Commons over bringing back the death penalty for some serious crimes such as murder or rape.

== Associations with loyalist paramilitaries ==
Though the party has never had official links to any major paramilitary organisation in Northern Ireland, multiple DUP members have had associations with loyalist groups, or expressed support for their actions, particularly during the Troubles. In 1972, William McCrea issued a press statement, saying, "We call on all Loyalists to give their continued support to the Ulster Defence Association as it seeks to ensure the safety of all law-abiding citizens against the bombs and bullets of the IRA. As the Catholic population have given their support to the IRA throughout this campaign of terror so must Loyalists grant unswerving support to those engaged in the cause of truth." McCrea became the DUP party chairman in February 1976. He and fellow DUP member Ivan Foster conducted funerals for Wesley Somerville and Harris Boyle, two UVF members who were killed while carrying out the Miami Showband killings in 1975. Foster had given the graveside oration for Sinclair Johnston, a UVF member who was shot by police during rioting in Larne in 1972.

McCrea also conducted the funeral service for Benjamin Redfern, a UDA member who was crushed while trying to escape the Maze Prison in a bin lorry in 1984. Redfern was serving a life sentence for the murder of two Catholics. In 1996, Billy Wright, a former UVF member who had founded the breakaway Loyalist Volunteer Force, organised a rally in defence of 'free speech'. McCrea accepted an invitation to address the meeting.

Omagh businessman Eddie Sayers stood as a DUP candidate in the 1973 Northern Ireland Assembly election for the constituency of Mid Ulster, but was not elected. He later became active in the UDA, and was appointed Brigadier for its Mid Ulster Brigade.

Bangor DUP councillor Billy Baxter was arrested in 1993 and convicted for soliciting funds for the UVF. He was subsequently expelled from the party.

In July 1994, DUP press officer Sammy Wilson and DUP deputy leader Peter Robinson were pallbearers at the funeral of UDA member Ray Smallwoods, who served half of a 15-year sentence for the attempted murder of Bernadette McAliskey in 1981. That same year, the UDA drafted a document – the 'Doomsday scenario' – which declared that in the event of a British withdrawal from Northern Ireland, the organisation's aim would be to "establish an ethnic Protestant homeland" within which the Catholic population would be "expelled, nullified or interned." Wilson praised the document, describing it as a "very valuable return to reality" which "shows that some loyalist paramilitaries are looking ahead and contemplating what needs to be done to maintain our separate Ulster identity".

In 2006, George Seawright was listed by the UVF as one of its members killed during the Troubles. Seawright was elected a DUP Belfast City Councillor in 1981, and a DUP candidate in the 1982 Northern Ireland Assembly election, though he was expelled from the party in 1984. His election agent was UVF leader John Bingham.

Former UVF member John Smyth, who was jailed for his activities in the 1970s, was a DUP councillor on the Antrim Borough Council for over a decade.

In 2014, Billy Hutchinson, a former member of the UVF who was convicted of murder in 1974, said that "most UVF men are DUP supporters, or those who vote anyway".

In January 2023, DUP councillor and former Mayor of Lisburn Paul Porter took part in a march to mark the 25th anniversary of the shooting dead of UDA member Jim Guiney by the INLA. The march was criticised by Marian Walsh, whose 17-year-old son Damien was murdered by the UDA in 1993.

In 2023, Tyler Hoey was selected as a DUP candidate to contest the Mid and East Antrim Council elections. In 2020, Hoey 'liked' a Twitter post commemorating the Greysteel massacre, which stated, "On this day 27 years ago, An Ulster Freedom Fighters Active Service Unit from North Antrim-Londonderry Brigade 'Trick or Treated' its way into the republican Rising Sun bar in Greysteel in order to gain revenge for the Shankill Bombing. Spirit of '93". Following this revelation, DUP leader Jeffrey Donaldson said that Hoey "deeply regrets some of the things that he said in the past" and that he is "entitled to a second chance."

== Leadership ==
Founder Ian Paisley led the party from its foundation in 1971 onwards, and retired as leader of the party in spring 2008.

Paisley was replaced by former deputy leader Peter Robinson on 31 May 2008, who in turn was replaced by Arlene Foster on 17 December 2015.

Foster announced in April 2021 that she would stand down as leader on 28 May 2021. Edwin Poots won the subsequent leadership election (the first in the party's history), against Sir Jeffrey Donaldson, however he stepped down after just 20 days in office and was replaced as leader by Donaldson on 26 June 2021. Donaldson resigned with immediate effect on 29 March 2024. As a result of Donaldson's resignation, deputy leader Gavin Robinson became the party's acting leader the same day. Following the announcement on 22 May 2024 that the 2024 United Kingdom general election would be held on 4 July, Robinson's leadership of the DUP was confirmed by the party executive on 29 May 2024 without a contested leadership election.

=== Party leader ===
The following are the terms of office as party leader and as First Minister of Northern Ireland:

Leader	Tenure	Constituency	First/deputy First Minister of Northern Ireland
The Rev Rt. Hon Ian Paisley	30 September 1971 – 31 May 2008	MP for Bannside (Note: (Northern Ireland Parliament)) (1970–1972); MP for North Antrim (1970–2010); MEP for Northern Ireland (1979–2004); MLA for North Antrim (1998–2011)	N/A
The Rev Rt. Hon Ian Paisley	30 September 1971 – 31 May 2008	MP for Bannside (1970–1972); MP for North Antrim (1970–2010); MEP for Northern Ireland (1979–2004); MLA for North Antrim (1998–2011)	Himself; 8 May 2007 – 5 June 2008 (2nd Executive)
The Rt. Hon Peter Robinson	31 May 2008 – 17 December 2015	MP for Belfast East (1979–2010); MLA for Belfast East (1998–2016)	Himself; 5 June 2008 – 11 January 2016 (2nd and 3rd Executive)
The Rt. Hon Arlene Foster	17 December 2015 – 28 May 2021	MLA for Fermanagh and South Tyrone (2003–2021)	Herself; 11 January 2016 – 9 January 2017 (4th and 5th Executive)
The Rt. Hon Arlene Foster	17 December 2015 – 28 May 2021	MLA for Fermanagh and South Tyrone (2003–2021)	Vacant; 9 January 2017– 11 January 2020
The Rt. Hon Arlene Foster	17 December 2015 – 28 May 2021	MLA for Fermanagh and South Tyrone (2003–2021)	Herself; 11 January 2020 – 14 June 2021 (5th Executive)
Edwin Poots	28 May 2021 – 30 June 2021	MLA for Lagan Valley (1998–2022)	Paul Givan; 17 June 2021 – 4 February 2022 (5th Executive)
Jeffrey Donaldson	30 June 2021 – 29 March 2024	MP for Lagan Valley (1997–2024)	Paul Givan; 17 June 2021 – 4 February 2022 (5th Executive)
Jeffrey Donaldson	30 June 2021 – 29 March 2024	MP for Lagan Valley (1997–2024)	Vacant; 4 February 2022 – 3 February 2024
Jeffrey Donaldson	30 June 2021 – 29 March 2024	MP for Lagan Valley (1997–2024)	Emma Little-Pengelly; 3 February 2024 – present (6th Executive)
The Rt. Hon Gavin Robinson	Acting: 29 March 2024 – 29 May 2024	MP for Belfast East (2015–present)	Emma Little-Pengelly; 3 February 2024 – present (6th Executive)
The Rt. Hon Gavin Robinson	29 May 2024 – present	MP for Belfast East (2015–present)	Emma Little-Pengelly; 3 February 2024 – present (6th Executive)

=== Deputy leader ===
Name	Period	Constituency
William Beattie	30 September 1971 – 31 May 1980	MP for South Antrim (1970–72)
Peter Robinson	31 May 1980 – 31 May 2008	MP for Belfast East (1979–2010); MLA for Belfast East (1998–2016)
Nigel Dodds	31 May 2008 – 28 May 2021	MLA for Belfast North (1998–2010); MP for Belfast North (2001–2019)
Paula Bradley	28 May 2021 – 9 June 2023	MLA for Belfast North (2011–2022)
Gavin Robinson	9 June 2023 – 28 May 2024	MP for Belfast East (2015–2024)
Michelle McIlveen	7 March 2025 – present	MLA for Strangford (2007–present)

=== Chairman ===
Period	Name
1971–1973	Desmond Boal
1973–1980	William Beattie
1981–2000	James McClure
2000–present	Maurice Morrow

=== Secretary ===
Period	Name
1975–1979	Peter Robinson
1980–1983	William Beattie
1983–1992	Alan Kane
1993–2008	Nigel Dodds
2008–present	Michelle McIlveen

=== Northern Ireland Executive Ministers ===
Portfolio	Name
Deputy First Minister	Emma Little-Pengelly
Junior Minister (nominated by Deputy First Minister)	Pam Cameron
Minister for Communities	Gordon Lyons
Minister of Education	Paul Givan

=== Westminster ===
Party leaders at Westminster

Name	Period	Constituency
Ian Paisley	1974–2008	North Antrim
Peter Robinson	2008–2010	Belfast East
Nigel Dodds	2010–2019	Belfast North
Jeffrey Donaldson	2019–2024	Lagan Valley
Gavin Robinson	2024–present	Belfast East

Party Chief Whip at Westminster

Name	Period	Constituency
Jeffrey Donaldson	2015–2019	Lagan Valley
Sammy Wilson	2019–present	East Antrim

== Representatives ==
=== Parliament of the United Kingdom ===
Members of the House of Commons

All members listed below as elected in 2024.

Portrait	Name	Constituency	Elected	Notes
	Gregory Campbell	East Londonderry	2001	DUP spokesperson for International Development and Cabinet Office
	Gavin Robinson	Belfast East	2015	Leader of the Democratic Unionist Party DUP spokesperson for Defence and Home Affairs
	Jim Shannon	Strangford	2010	DUP spokesperson for Health and Human Rights
	Sammy Wilson	East Antrim	2005	DUP Chief Whip in the House of Commons DUP spokesperson for the Treasury

Members of the House of Lords

Portrait	Name	Since	Notes
	The Lord Browne of Belmont	2006	Former MLA for East Belfast (2007–2011)
	The Lord Hay of Ballyore	2014	Former Speaker of the Northern Ireland Assembly (2007–2014) from Foyle (1998–2014)
	The Lord Morrow	2006	Chairman of the DUP (2000–present)
	The Lord McCrea of Magherafelt and Cookstown	2018	Former MP for Mid Ulster (1983–1997) and South Antrim (2000–01; 2005–2015)
	The Lord Dodds of Duncairn	2021	Leader of the Democratic Unionist Party in the House of Lords (2021–present) Former MP for Belfast North (2001–2019)
	The Lord Weir of Ballyholme	2022	Former Minister for Education in the Northern Ireland Executive (2016–2017; 2020–2022)

=== Northern Ireland Assembly ===
Members of the Northern Ireland Assembly as of 15 November 2026:

{*} = Member was co-opted (appointed) to fill a seat.

Name	Constituency	Since
Maurice Bradley	East Londonderry	2016
Phillip Brett	Belfast North	2022
David Brooks	Belfast East	2022
Cheryl Brownlee	East Antrim	2023*
Keith Buchanan	Mid Ulster	2016
Thomas Buchanan	West Tyrone	2003
Jonathan Buckley	Upper Bann	2017
Joanne Bunting	Belfast East	2016
Pam Cameron	South Antrim	2011
Trevor Clarke	South Antrim	2007
Diane Dodds	Upper Bann	2020*
Stephen Dunne	North Down	2021*
Deborah Erskine	Fermanagh and South Tyrone	2021*
Diane Forsythe	South Down	2022
Paul Frew	North Antrim	2010*
Paul Givan	Lagan Valley	2010*
Harry Harvey	Strangford	2019*
William Irwin	Newry and Armagh	2007
Brian Kingston	Belfast North	2022
Emma Little-Pengelly	Lagan Valley	2022*
Gordon Lyons	East Antrim	2015*
Peter Martin	North Down	2024*
Michelle McIlveen	Strangford	2007
Gary Middleton	Foyle	2014*
Edwin Poots	Belfast South	1998
Alan Robinson	East Londonderry	2022

== Electoral performance ==
=== Devolved legislature elections ===
Election	Leader	Body	Votes	%	Seats	+/–	Position	Status
1973	Ian Paisley	Assembly	78,228	10.8	8 / 78	▲8	▲3rd	Opposition
1975	Ian Paisley	Constitutional; Convention	97,073	14.8	12 / 78	▲4	▼4th	Consultative
1982	Ian Paisley	Assembly	145,528	23.0	21 / 78	▲9	▲2nd	Second party
1996	Ian Paisley	Forum	141,413	18.8	24 / 110	▲24	2nd	Consultative
1998	Ian Paisley	Assembly	145,917	18.5	20 / 108	▼4	▼3rd	Coalition
2003	Ian Paisley	Assembly	177,944	25.7	30 / 108	▲10	▲1st	Direct rule
2007	Ian Paisley	Assembly	207,721	30.1	36 / 108	▲6	1st	Coalition
2011	Peter Robinson	Assembly	198,436	30.0	38 / 108	▲2	1st	Coalition
2016	Arlene Foster	Assembly	202,567	29.2	38 / 108	Steady	1st	Coalition
2017	Arlene Foster	Assembly	225,413	28.1	28 / 90	▼10	1st	Coalition
2022	Jeffrey Donaldson	Assembly	184,002	21.3	25 / 90	▼3	▼2nd	Coalition

=== Westminster elections ===
Election	Leader	Northern Ireland					Status
Election	Leader	Votes	%	Seats	+/–	Position	Status
Feb 1974	Ian Paisley	58,656	5.7	1 / 12	▲1	▲4th	Opposition
Oct 1974	Ian Paisley	59,541	5.8	1 / 12	Steady	4th	Opposition
1979	Ian Paisley	70,975	10.2	3 / 12	▲2	▲2nd	Opposition
1983	Ian Paisley	152,749	19.9	3 / 17	Steady	2nd	Opposition
1987	Ian Paisley	85,642	11.7	3 / 17	Steady	▼3rd	Opposition
1992	Ian Paisley	103,039	13.1	3 / 17	Steady	3rd	Opposition
1997	Ian Paisley	107,348	13.6	2 / 18	▼1	▼4th	Opposition
2001	Ian Paisley	181,999	22.5	5 / 18	▲3	▲2nd	Opposition
2005	Ian Paisley	241,856	33.7	9 / 18	▲4	▲1st	Opposition
2010	Peter Robinson	168,216	25.0	8 / 18	▼1	1st	Opposition
2015	Peter Robinson	184,260	25.7	8 / 18	Steady	1st	Opposition
2017	Arlene Foster	292,316	36.0	10 / 18	▲2	1st	Confidence and supply
2019	Arlene Foster	244,127	30.6	8 / 18	▼2	1st	Opposition
2024	Gavin Robinson	172,058	22.1	5 / 18	▼3	▼2nd	Opposition

== See also ==
- British Isles fixed sea link connections
- Democratic Unionist Party scandals
- List of Democratic Unionist Party MPs
- List of Northern Ireland Members of the House of Lords
