= Castlereagh College =

College in Belfast, Northern Ireland

Coordinates: 54.578°N 5.894°W

Castlereagh College was a further and higher education college in east Belfast. In 2007, it merged with the Belfast Institute of Further and Higher Education to form part of the Belfast Metropolitan College. The site is home to six buildings in total with classrooms for different disciplines.

As of 2023, The Castlereagh site has been proposed for closure amid tightening budgets within the Belfast Metropolitan College, along with problems maintaining the building due to age.
