= Fitness to plead =

Ability to understand legal proceedings

In the law of England and Wales, fitness to plead is the capacity of a defendant in criminal proceedings to comprehend the course of those proceedings. The concept of fitness to plead also applies in Scots and Irish law. Its United States equivalent is competence to stand trial.

== Test ==
If the issue of fitness to plead is raised, a judge is able to find a person unfit to plead. This is usually done based on information following a psychiatric evaluation.

In England and Wales the legal test of fitness to plead is based on the ruling of Alderson B. in R v Pritchard. The accused will be unfit to plead if they are unable:

- to comprehend the course of proceedings on the trial, so as to make a proper defence; or
- to know that they might challenge any jurors to whom they may object; or
- to comprehend the evidence; or
- to give proper instructions to their legal representatives.

If the issue is raised by the prosecution, the prosecution must prove beyond reasonable doubt that the defendant is unfit to plead. If the issue is raised by the defence, it need only be proved on the balance of probabilities.

In Scotland the test is based on HMA v Wilson, and has two elements:

- to be able to instruct counsel and
- to understand and follow proceedings.

== Procedure ==
The question of unfitness to plead is determined by a judge. The decision should normally be made as soon as it arises, which would ordinarily be before arraignment, but the court may postpone consideration of unfitness until any time before the opening of the defence case. This power might be used to allow the defence to challenge the prosecution case on the basis that there is no case to answer.

Under the earlier Criminal Procedure (Insanity) Act 1964, determination of unfitness to plead led to an assumption that the accused had committed the act, without need for the prosecution to submit evidence, followed by automatic admission to hospital. In consequence fitness to plead was very rarely raised by defendants.

Since the 1991 Criminal Procedure (Insanity and Unfitness to Plead) Act, if the judge determines that the defendant is unfit to plead, a "trial of the facts" is held in which evidence is heard and the jury asked to determine whether the defendant did the act or made the omission charged against them as the offence. This process avoids the detention of innocent persons in hospital merely because they are mentally unfit. It has been held that the reference to the "act or omission" means that the jury should not normally consider whether the defendant had the requisite mens rea.

If the jury find that the defendant is unfit to plead, the judge may:

- make a guardianship order within the meaning of the Mental Health Act 1983;
- make a supervision and treatment order within the meaning of Schedule 2 to the Criminal Procedure (Insanity and Unfitness to Plead) Act 1991; or
- make an order for his absolute discharge.

== Criticism ==
An appraisal of the use of the legal test for fitness to plead in England found that 40% of psychiatric court reports did not mention fitness to plead at all, and that only a third made a statement about fitness to plead that was supported by reference to the legal criteria.

Research on the application of the legal test in Scotland shows that only 40% of psychiatric court reports made reference to the full legal criteria for fitness to plead.

Other jurisdictions address issues of a defendant's ability to meaningfully participate in the proceedings in a variety of ways. For example, in New York, if a defendant's capacity to understand the proceedings and participate in his or her defense is in question, the court will order that the defendant be examined by two independent medical professionals and conduct a hearing to consider the medical evidence, a procedure known as a "730 examination" as it is governed by Section 730 of the New York Criminal Procedure Law. Analogous procedures exist in other jurisdictions.

== See also ==
- English law
