= May 2021 Democratic Unionist Party leadership election =

Leadership election of the DUP, a Northern Irish political party

- 6–14 May 2021
- Turnout: 100%
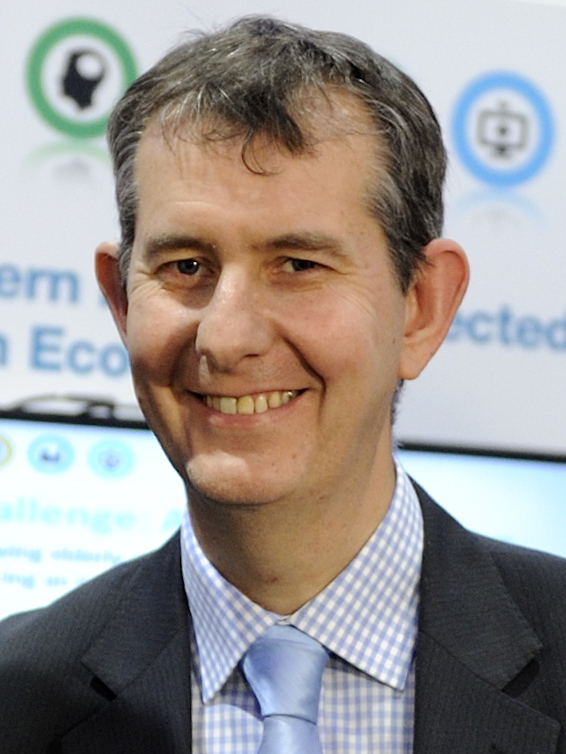

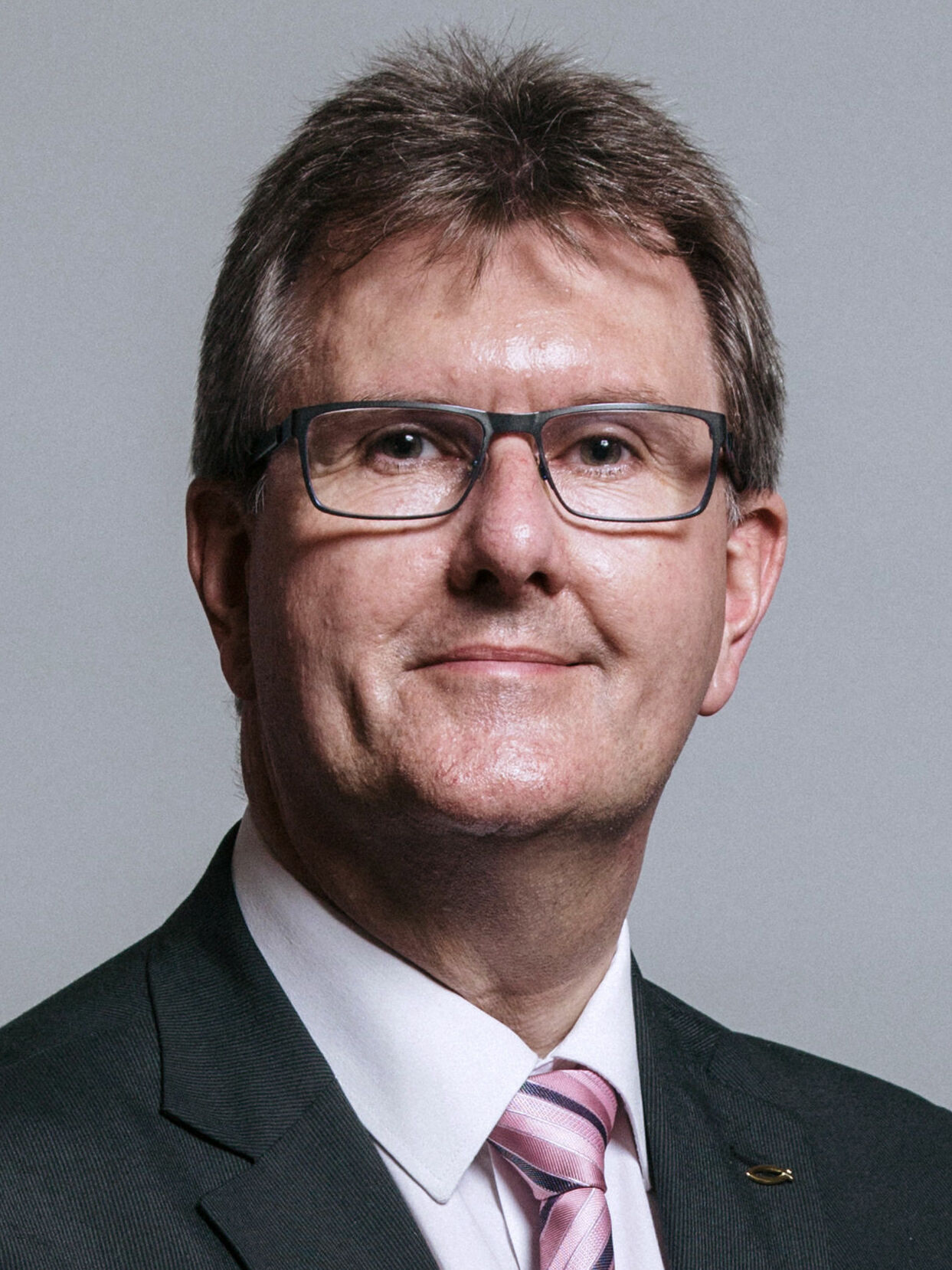
Candidate	Edwin Poots	Jeffrey Donaldson
MPs/MLAs ballots	19	17
Percentage	52.80%	47.20%
Leader before election
Arlene Foster
Elected Leader
Edwin Poots

The May 2021 Democratic Unionist Party leadership election was triggered by Arlene Foster's resignation from leadership. It was the Democratic Unionist Party's first leadership election since the party's founding in 1971.

Foster released a statement on 28 April 2021 announcing her intention to resign as party leader on 28 May in order to provide party officers with some space to arrange for the leadership contest. Party chair Maurice Morrow later announced that the leadership election would take place on 14 May 2021.

Edwin Poots MLA won, with 19 votes from DUP MPs and MLAs, beating Sir Jeffrey Donaldson MP's 17 votes. At the same time, Paula Bradley MLA was elected as the party's deputy leader to replace Nigel Dodds, Baron Dodds of Duncairn, beating Gregory Campbell MP by 18 votes to 16.

After agreeing to a deal that resolved the stalemate over the Irish Language Act, Poots stood down as leader on 17 June after a meeting where a majority of DUP MLAs and MPs voted against the party nominating a replacement for Arlene Foster.

== Background ==
Following the end of Brexit negotiations that culminated in the EU–UK Trade and Cooperation Agreement in 2020, party leader Arlene Foster was criticised for supporting prime minister Boris Johnson, who was blamed for the Irish Sea border due to the Northern Ireland Protocol. In contrast to most other DUP Northern Ireland Assembly members, Foster abstained in a vote on gay conversion therapy.

22 DUP Members of the Legislative Assembly and four Members of Parliament expressed no-confidence in her leadership in a letter.

== Timeline ==
- 6 May 2021: Nominations closed at 17:00 BST
- 14 May 2021: Election day

== Candidates ==
=== Declared ===
Candidate	Born	Political office	Announced	Source
Sir Jeffrey Donaldson	7 December 1962; Kilkeel, Northern Ireland	Leader in the House of Commons (since 2019); MP for Lagan Valley (since 1997)	3 May 2021	
Edwin Poots	27 May 1965; Lisburn, Northern Ireland	Minister of Agriculture, Environment, and Rural Affairs (since 2020); MLA for Lagan Valley (since 1998)	29 April 2021	

=== Declined ===
Candidate	Born	Political office	Reason
Gavin Robinson	22 November 1984; Belfast, Northern Ireland	MP for Belfast East (since 2015); Lord Mayor of Belfast (2012–2013); Member of the Belfast City Council (2011–2015)	Endorsing Jeffrey Donaldson

== Results ==
The election was held on 14 May 2021, with the result announced on the same day at approximately 17:00 BST. Under the party's constitution, any party member that is either a Member of the Legislative Assembly or an MP in the House of Commons is entitled to vote. The electorate encompassed the DUP's 8 MPs and 28 MLAs. The five DUP members of the House of Lords were not permitted to vote.

Full result
Candidate	MP / MLA votes	
Candidate	Votes	%
Edwin Poots	19	52.8
Sir Jeffrey Donaldson	17	47.2
