= 1989 Lisburn Borough Council election =

Local government election in Northern Ireland

← 1985	17 May 1989	1993 →

All 28 seats to Lisburn Borough Council 15 seats needed for a majority
	First party	Second party	Third party
Party	UUP	DUP	SDLP
Seats won	15	5	3
Seat change	▲2	▼3	▲1
	Fourth party	Fifth party	Sixth party
Party	Alliance	Sinn Féin	Ind. Conservative
Seats won	2	2	1
Seat change	▼1	0	▲1

Elections to Lisburn Borough Council were held on 17 May 1989 on the same day as the other Northern Irish local government elections. The election used four district electoral areas to elect a total of 28 councillors.

== Election results ==
Lisburn Borough Council Election Result 1989
Party	Seats	Gains	Losses	Net gain/loss	Seats %	Votes %	Votes	+/−
UUP	15	2	0	▲2	53.6	49.9	16,786	▲7.1
DUP	5	0	3	▼3	17.9	17.8	5,996	▼14.3
SDLP	3	1	0	▲1	10.7	8.0	2,685	▲1.4
Alliance	2	0	1	▼1	7.1	10.7	3,603	▼0.3
Sinn Féin	2	0	0	0	7.1	7.6	2,573	▲1.9
Ind. Conservative	1	1	0	▲1	3.6	2.2	752	▲2.2
Workers' Party	0	0	0	0	0.0	3.1	1,037	▲1.3
Ulster Democratic	0	0	0	0	0.0	0.7	235	▲0.7

Note: "Votes" are the first preference votes.

== Districts summary ==
Results of the Lisburn Borough Council election, 1989 by district
Ward	%	Cllrs	%	Cllrs	%	Cllrs	%	Cllrs	%	Cllrs	%	Cllrs	Total Cllrs
Ward	UUP		DUP		SDLP		Alliance		Sinn Féin		Others		Total Cllrs
Downshire	56.1	4	32.3	2	0.0	0	10.8	1	0.0	0	0.8	0	7
Dunmurry Cross	26.4	2	10.7	1	18.1	2	7.6	0	28.7	2	8.5	0	7
Killultagh	52.9	4	17.7	1	10.9	1	7.6	0	0.0	0	10.9	1	7
Lisburn Town	68.8	5	10.3	1	0.0	0	18.9	1	0.0	0	2.0	0	7
Total	49.9	15	17.8	5	8.0	3	10.7	2	7.6	2	6.0	1	28

== Districts results ==
=== Downshire ===
1985: 3 x UUP, 3 x DUP, 1 x Alliance
1989: 4 x UUP, 2 x DUP, 1 x Alliance
1985-1989 Change: UUP gain from DUP

Downshire - 7 seats
Party	Candidate	FPv%	Count						
Party	Candidate	FPv%	1	2	3	4	5	6	7
UUP	William Bleakes*	28.40%	2,297						
UUP	Thomas Lilburn*	13.40%	1,084						
DUP	Charles Poots*	12.88%	1,042						
DUP	Anne Blake	12.34%	998	1,125.11					
UUP	Thomas Davis	8.24%	666	992.61	995.18	1,018.55			
UUP	Wilfred Corfield-McClung*	2.11%	171	634.98	636.98	682.01	705.11	706.88	1,023.51
Alliance	Kenneth Hull	10.78%	872	910.76	951.33	951.9	956.59	956.95	1,000.61
DUP	James McCann	7.10%	574	637.84	641.84	658.37	666.42	689.88	816.42
UUP	John Curry	3.96%	320	572.51	575.51	601.16	633.78	636.39	
Workers' Party	Patrick Pollock	0.78%	63	64.71					
Electorate: 15,814 Valid: 8,087 (51.14%) Spoilt: 175 Quota: 1,011 Turnout: 8,262 (52.24%)

=== Dunmurry Cross ===
1985: 2 x Sinn Féin, 2 x UUP, 1 x SDLP, 1 x DUP, 1 x Alliance
1989: 2 x Sinn Féin, 2 x UUP, 2 x SDLP, 1 x DUP
1985-1989 Change: SDLP gain from Alliance

Dunmurry Cross - 7 seats
Party	Candidate	FPv%	Count				
Party	Candidate	FPv%	1	2	3	4	5
Sinn Féin	Patrick Rice*	16.69%	1,498				
UUP	William McAllister*	12.91%	1,159				
UUP	Billy Bell	10.66%	957	1,145			
Sinn Féin	Michael Ferguson	11.98%	1,075	1,075	1,421.06		
DUP	William Beattie*	10.74%	964	1,005	1,005	1,007.28	1,123.28
SDLP	William McDonnell*	9.12%	819	819	835.12	1,000.04	1,086.84
SDLP	Hugh Lewsley	9.00%	808	808	813.2	882.36	1,068.66
Workers' Party	John Lowry	8.48%	761	764	768.16	808.44	972.7
Alliance	Patrick Bell	7.62%	684	698	698.52	719.8	
UUP	Richard Scott*	2.81%	252				
Electorate: 16,626 Valid: 8,977 (53.99%) Spoilt: 337 Quota: 1,123 Turnout: 9,314 (56.02%)

=== Killultagh ===
1985: 4 x UUP, 2 x DUP, 1 x SDLP
1989: 4 x UUP, 1 x DUP, 1 x SDLP, 1 x Independent Conservative
1985-1989 Change: Independent Conservative gain from DUP

Killultagh - 7 seats
Party	Candidate	FPv%	Count						
Party	Candidate	FPv%	1	2	3	4	5	6	7
UUP	David Campbell	21.39%	2,072						
UUP	Ronnie Crawford	9.46%	917	1,371.69					
UUP	Jim Dillon*	12.50%	1,211	1,352.86					
DUP	Cecil Calvert*	12.41%	1,202	1,294.66					
UUP	William Lewis*	9.56%	926	1,021.12	1,141.92	1,250.6			
SDLP	Peter O'Hagan	10.92%	1,058	1,059.64	1,059.8	1,059.8	1,083.8	1,086.96	1,091.28
Ind. Conservative	David Greene	7.76%	752	765.53	775.13	783.49	788.9	827.19	1,024.49
Alliance	Eileen Drayne	7.64%	740	752.71	758.63	761.71	794.12	813.92	845.02
DUP	William Stevenson	5.20%	504	524.91	533.87	545.75	548.91	653.91	
Ulster Democratic	Richard Haggan	2.43%	235	241.97	253.81	261.29	264.29		
Workers' Party	Anne-Marie Lowry	0.74%	72	72.82	73.62	73.62			
Electorate: 18,323 Valid: 9,689 (52.88%) Spoilt: 141 Quota: 1,212 Turnout: 9,830 (53.65%)

=== Lisburn Town ===
1985: 4 x UUP, 2 x DUP, 1 x Alliance
1989: 5 x UUP, 1 x DUP, 1 x Alliance
1985-1989 Change: UUP gain from DUP

Lisburn Town - 7 seats
Party	Candidate	FPv%	Count						
Party	Candidate	FPv%	1	2	3	4	5	6	7
UUP	Ivan Davis*	36.59%	2,530						
Alliance	Seamus Close*	18.90%	1,307						
UUP	William Belshaw*	15.17%	1,049						
UUP	Samuel Semple*	9.89%	684	1,156.6					
UUP	George Morrison	2.56%	177	585.68	620.54	722.54	769.88	886.56	
UUP	William Gardiner-Watson	2.82%	195	513.24	582.12	670.12	746.44	857.4	880.4
DUP	Robin McMaster	6.10%	422	586.56	596.64	614.64	635.34	667.86	719.54
DUP	James Mulholland	4.19%	290	417.84	428.34	446.34	460.74	497.92	538.18
Workers' Party	Paul McDonald	2.04%	141	160.04	445.22	449.22	450.84	452.78	
UUP	Andrew Park	1.72%	119	261.8	291.62	351.12	366.96		
Electorate: 14,362 Valid: 6,914 (48.14%) Spoilt: 145 Quota: 865 Turnout: 7,059 (49.15%)
