= 1981 Lisburn Borough Council election =

Local government election in Northern Ireland

← 1977	20 May 1981	1985 →

All 23 seats to Lisburn Borough Council 12 seats needed for a majority
	First party	Second party	Third party
Party	DUP	UUP	Alliance
Seats won	10	8	2
Seat change	▲4	▼2	▼1
	Fourth party	Fifth party	Sixth party
Party	SDLP	UUUP	Unionist Party NI
Seats won	2	1	0
Seat change	0	0	▼1

Elections to Lisburn Borough Council were held on 20 May 1981 on the same day as the other Northern Irish local government elections. The election used five district electoral areas to elect a total of 23 councillors.

== Election results ==
Lisburn Borough Council Election Result 1981
Party	Seats	Gains	Losses	Net gain/loss	Seats %	Votes %	Votes	+/−
DUP	10	4	0	▲4	43.5	42.7	13,867	▲16.1
UUP	8	0	2	▼2	34.8	32.2	10,471	▲2.2
Alliance	2	0	1	▼1	8.7	12.2	3,976	▼8.2
SDLP	2	0	0	0	8.7	5.9	1,918	▼0.3
UUUP	1	1	1	0	4.3	2.0	659	▼3.9
Independent	0	0	0	0	0.0	2.3	740	▲1.5
Republican Clubs	0	0	0	0	0.0	1.4	462	▲0.2
Unionist Party NI	0	0	1	▼1	0.0	0.7	232	▼5.2
NI Labour	0	0	0	0	0.0	0.3	107	▲0.3
Communist	0	0	0	0	0.0	0.2	72	▲0.2

Note: "Votes" are the first preference votes.

== Districts summary ==
Results of the Lisburn Borough Council election, 1981 by district
Ward	%	Cllrs	%	Cllrs	%	Cllrs	%	Cllrs	%	Cllrs	%	Cllrs	Total Cllrs
Ward	DUP		UUP		Alliance		SDLP		UUUP		Others		Total Cllrs
Area A	30.2	1	51.8	2	0.0	0	18.0	1	0.0	0	0.0	0	4
Area B	43.7	3	39.7	2	10.6	0	0.0	0	0.0	0	6.0	0	5
Area C	54.3	3	20.6	1	11.9	1	0.0	0	5.9	0	7.3	0	5
Area D	49.6	2	27.3	2	18.5	1	0.0	0	1.8	0	2.8	0	5
Area E	30.0	1	28.7	1	15.3	0	15.9	1	1.6	1	8.5	0	4
Total	42.7	10	32.2	8	12.2	2	5.9	2	2.0	1	5.0	0	23

== Districts results ==
=== Area A ===
1977: 2 x UUP, 1 x DUP, 1 x SDLP
1981: 2 x UUP, 1 x DUP, 1 x SDLP
1977-1981 Change: No change

Lisburn Area A - 4 seats
Party	Candidate	FPv%	Count				
Party	Candidate	FPv%	1	2	3	4	5
UUP	Ronald Campbell*	25.81%	1,299				
DUP	Jim Wells	19.95%	1,004				
UUP	Jim Dillon*	18.20%	916	1,129.21			
SDLP	John Clenaghan*	17.98%	905	913.97	915.65	915.86	932.28
DUP	Charles Woodburne*	10.23%	515	527.19	537.55	548.68	842.47
UUP	Henry Stewart	7.83%	394	429.65	539.13	545.01	
Electorate: 7,983 Valid: 5,033 (63.05%) Spoilt: 109 Quota: 1,007 Turnout: 5,142 (64.41%)

=== Area B ===
1977: 3 x UUP, 2 x DUP
1981: 3 x DUP, 2 x UUP
1977-1981 Change: DUP gain from UUP

Lisburn Area B - 5 seats
Party	Candidate	FPv%	Count					
Party	Candidate	FPv%	1	2	3	4	5	6
DUP	Charles Poots*	25.09%	1,469					
UUP	William Bleakes*	20.87%	1,222					
UUP	Thomas Lilburn*	11.19%	655	697.57	843.77	965.88	1,356.88	
DUP	Samuel Dorman*	10.59%	620	789.62	825.22	850.59	891.39	956.39
DUP	James McCann	8.01%	469	688.45	697.05	760.62	827.96	891.96
Alliance	John Alderdice	10.64%	623	625.97	639.57	701.5	741.55	828.55
UUP	Joseph McCullough	7.63%	447	479.34	509.54	582.25		
Independent	William Johnston	5.99%	351	364.2	370.4			
Electorate: 9,350 Valid: 5,856 (62.63%) Spoilt: 121 Quota: 977 Turnout: 5,977 (63.93%)

=== Area C ===
1977: 2 x UUP, 1 x DUP, 1 x Alliance, 1 x UUUP
1981: 3 x DUP, 1 x UUP, 1 x Alliance
1977-1981 Change: DUP (two seats) gain from UUP and UUUP

Lisburn Area C - 5 seats
Party	Candidate	FPv%	Count						
Party	Candidate	FPv%	1	2	3	4	5	6	7
DUP	William Belshaw*	35.49%	2,412						
DUP	Denis McCarroll	12.60%	856	1,290.6					
DUP	Robert Dunsmore	6.22%	423	979.5	989.56	1,110.4	1,189.4		
UUP	William Gardiner-Watson*	11.95%	812	884.61	889.67	895.75	1,011.89	1,221.89	
Alliance	Seamus Close*	11.93%	811	826.37	890.55	891.69	979	1,002.28	1,007.88
UUP	Wilfred McClung*	8.61%	585	632.17	634.23	641.07	683.74	863.24	945.56
UUUP	George Morrison*	5.90%	401	488.45	494.51	509.33	581.25		
Independent	William Whitley	5.72%	389	430.34	446.87	451.43			
NI Labour	Robert Clarke	1.57%	107	115.48					
Electorate: 11,569 Valid: 6,796 (58.74%) Spoilt: 196 Quota: 1,133 Turnout: 6,992 (60.44%)

=== Area D ===
1977: 2 x UUP, 1 x DUP, 1 x Alliance, 1 x UPNI
1981: 2 x DUP, 2 x UUP, 1 x Alliance
1977-1981 Change: DUP gain from UPNI

Lisburn Area D - 5 seats
Party	Candidate	FPv%	Count						
Party	Candidate	FPv%	1	2	3	4	5	6	7
DUP	Ivan Davis*	44.02%	3,720						
DUP	Robert McNeice	5.56%	470	2,105.84					
UUP	Samuel Semple*	12.65%	1,069	1,313.48	1,630.28				
UUP	Maureen McKinney*	9.32%	788	963.36	1,090.56	1,156.81	1,264.48	1,437.38	
Alliance	George Boyd*	12.85%	1,086	1,125.68	1,138.58	1,140.33	1,178.5	1,204.89	1,665.89
UUP	David Trimble	5.37%	454	494.96	565.16	683.41	764.25	903.76	903.76
Alliance	James Mulholland	5.67%	479	498.84	503.94	504.94	520.36	535.35	
UUUP	John Curry	1.81%	153	246.44	373.04	393.29	455.76		
Unionist Party NI	David Gordon	2.75%	232	291.52	327.22	334.47			
Electorate: 14,016 Valid: 8,451 (60.30%) Spoilt: 158 Quota: 1,409 Turnout: 8,639 (61.64%)

=== Area E ===
1977: 1 x Alliance, 1 x UUP, 1 x DUP, 1 x SDLP
1981: 1 x DUP, 1 x UUP, 1 x SDLP, 1 x UUUP
1977-1981 Change: UUUP gain from Alliance

Lisburn Area E - 4 seats
Party	Candidate	FPv%	Count					
Party	Candidate	FPv%	1	2	3	4	5	6
DUP	William Beattie*	29.98%	1,909					
UUP	William McAllister*	28.74%	1,830					
SDLP	William McDonnell*	15.91%	1,013	1,013.74	1,014.73	1,036.73	1,197.1	1,220.47
UUUP	James Davis	1.65%	105	674.43	1,096.17	1,099.31	1,100.64	1,158.97
Alliance	John Cousins*	8.51%	542	566.42	611.3	619.74	691.4	1,100.58
Alliance	Brian Fitzsimons	6.83%	435	463.49	534.77	537.1	552.13	
Republican Clubs	Gerard Dunlop	7.26%	462	464.22	468.18	487.18		
Communist	Terry Bruton	1.13%	72	76.07	77.72			
Electorate: 12,242 Valid: 6,368 (52.02%) Spoilt: 463 Quota: 1,274 Turnout: 6,831 (55.80%)
