= 1977 Lisburn Borough Council election =

Local government election in Northern Ireland

← 1973	18 May 1977	1981 →

All 23 seats to Lisburn Borough Council 12 seats needed for a majority
	First party	Second party	Third party
Party	UUP	DUP	Alliance
Seats won	10	6	3
Seat change	▼4	▲2	0
	Fourth party	Fifth party	Sixth party
Party	SDLP	UUUP	Unionist Party NI
Seats won	2	1	1
Seat change	▲1	▲1	▲1
	Seventh party
Party	Vanguard
Seats won	0
Seat change	▼1

Elections to Lisburn Borough Council were held on 18 May 1977 on the same day as the other Northern Irish local government elections. The election used five district electoral areas to elect a total of 23 councillors.

== Election results ==
Lisburn Borough Council Election Result 1977
Party	Seats	Gains	Losses	Net gain/loss	Seats %	Votes %	Votes	+/−
UUP	10	0	4	▼4	43.4	30.0	7,877	▼18.9
DUP	6	2	0	▲2	26.1	26.6	6,724	▲9.8
Alliance	3	0	0	0	13.0	20.4	5,164	▲2.3
SDLP	2	1	0	▲1	8.7	6.2	1,563	▲0.9
Unionist Party NI	1	1	0	▲1	4.3	5.9	1,485	New
UUUP	1	1	0	▲1	4.3	5.6	1,464	New
Vanguard	0	0	1	▼1	0.0	2.0	507	▼4.6
Republican Clubs	0	0	0	0	0.0	1.2	305	New
Independent	0	0	0	0	0.0	0.8	207	▼0.6

Note: "Votes" are the first preference votes.

== Districts summary ==
Results of the Lisburn Borough Council election, 1977 by district
Ward	%	Cllrs	%	Cllrs	%	Cllrs	%	Cllrs	%	Cllrs	%	Cllrs	%	Cllrs	Total Cllrs
Ward	UUP		DUP		Alliance		SDLP		UPNI		UUUP		Others		Total Cllrs
Area A	50.4	2	20.1	1	7.0	0	19.9	1	0.0	0	3.1	0	0.0	0	4
Area B	46.3	3	34.4	2	15.1	0	0.0	0	0.0	0	4.2	0	0.0	0	5
Area C	24.7	2	31.0	1	22.5	1	0.0	0	0.0	0	13.5	1	8.3	0	5
Area D	20.9	2	25.8	1	23.4	1	0.0	0	21.8	1	4.1	0	4.0	0	5
Area E	26.2	1	21.3	1	27.4	1	16.1	1	0.0	0	3.5	0	5.5	0	4
Total	30.0	10	26.6	6	20.4	3	6.2	2	5.9	1	5.6	1	4.0	0	23

== Districts results ==
=== Area A ===
1973: 3 x UUP, 1 x SDLP
1977: 2 x UUP, 1 x DUP, 1 x SDLP
1973-1977 Change: DUP gain from UUP

Lisburn Area A - 4 seats
Party	Candidate	FPv%	Count		
Party	Candidate	FPv%	1	2	3
UUP	Ronald Campbell	25.72%	889		
DUP	Charles Woodburne	20.11%	695		
SDLP	John Clenaghan	19.88%	687	691.62	828.62
UUP	Jim Dillon	14.27%	493	634.46	733.46
UUP	Henry Stewart	9.90%	342	371.92	447.72
Alliance	Patrick Dorrian	7.00%	242	245.52	
UUUP	Henry Sloan	3.13%	108	118.56	
Electorate: 7,040 Valid: 3,456 (49.09%) Spoilt: 174 Quota: 692 Turnout: 3,630 (51.56%)

=== Area B ===
1973: 4 x UUP, 1 x DUP
1977: 3 x UUP, 2 x DUP
1973-1977 Change: DUP gain from UUP

Lisburn Area B - 5 seats
Party	Candidate	FPv%	Count				
Party	Candidate	FPv%	1	2	3	4	5
DUP	Charles Poots*	27.05%	1,174				
DUP	Samuel Dorman	7.33%	318	677.19	778.19		
UUP	Thomas Lilburn	12.05%	523	537.82	558.94	733.54	
UUP	Elsie Kelsey*	12.63%	548	558.53	586.55	710.25	729.25
UUP	William Bleakes	13.96%	606	618.09	638.99	681.67	707.67
Alliance	Moore Sinnerton	15.12%	656	657.95	660.73	673.51	675.51
UUP	James Lilley*	7.70%	334	352.72	372.4		
UUUP	John Curry	4.17%	181	211.42			
Electorate: 8,866 Valid: 4,340 (48.95%) Spoilt: 108 Quota: 724 Turnout: 4,448 (50.17%)

=== Area C ===
1973: 2 x UUP, 1 x DUP, 1 x Alliance, 1 x Vanguard
1977: 2 x UUP, 1 x DUP, 1 x Alliance, 1 x UUUP
1973-1977 Change: Vanguard joins UUUP

Lisburn Area C - 5 seats
Party	Candidate	FPv%	Count				
Party	Candidate	FPv%	1	2	3	4	5
DUP	William Belshaw*	26.53%	1,388				
Alliance	Seamus Close*	18.68%	987				
UUP	William Gardiner-Watson	17.09%	894				
UUUP	George Morrison*	13.46%	704	783.92	796.4	804.91	934.91
UUP	Wilfred McClung	8.61%	397	416.98	499.35	575.02	787.35
DUP	Denis McCarroll	4.45%	233	573.77	577.14	580.13	689.82
Vanguard	Ronnie Crawford	8.43%	441	499.83	524.2	550.65	
Alliance	Thomas Hughes	3.59%	188	190.59			
Electorate: 11,377 Valid: 5,232 (45.99%) Spoilt: 224 Quota: 873 Turnout: 5,456 (47.96%)

=== Area D ===
1973: 3 x UUP, 1 x DUP, 1 x Alliance
1977: 2 x UUP, 1 x DUP, 1 x Alliance, 1 x UPNI
1973-1977 Change: UPNI gain from UUP

Lisburn Area D - 5 seats
Party	Candidate	FPv%	Count					
Party	Candidate	FPv%	1	2	3	4	5	6
DUP	Ivan Davis*	25.77%	1,758					
Unionist Party NI	Robert Kirkwood*	21.76%	1,485					
Alliance	George Boyd	17.85%	1,218					
UUP	Samuel Semple*	13.92%	950	1,055.08	1,184.2			
UUP	Maureen McKinney	9.32%	476	540.01	613.45	708.46	710.08	1,074.54
UUUP	James Davis	4.13%	282	688.26	704.34	780.9	781.86	807.53
Alliance	Hazel Ervine	5.58%	381	390.62	474.14	584.19	652.89	
Independent	Gerald King	3.03%	207	218.84	240.68			
UUP	Andrew Oliver	0.97%	66	85.61	100.49			
Electorate: 13,881 Valid: 6,823 (49.15%) Spoilt: 199 Quota: 1,138 Turnout: 7,022 (50.59%)

=== Area E ===
1973: 2 x UUP, 1 x Alliance, 1 x DUP
1977: 1 x Alliance, 1 x UUP, 1 x DUP, 1 x SDLP
1973-1977 Change: SDLP gain from UUP

Lisburn Area E - 4 seats
Party	Candidate	FPv%	Count							
Party	Candidate	FPv%	1	2	3	4	5	6	7	8
Alliance	John Cousins*	19.23%	1,047	1,053	1,113					
UUP	William McAllister	18.49%	1,007	1,061	1,064	1,402				
SDLP	William McDonnell	16.09%	876	876	989	990	990	1,145		
DUP	William Beattie	11.57%	630	683	683	705	776	822	833.16	835.16
DUP	Robert McNeice*	9.70%	528	558	558	604	699	777	820.71	828.71
Alliance	Brian Fitzsimons	8.17%	445	451	473	494	584			
UUP	David Saulters	7.68%	418	444	444					
Republican Clubs	Gerard Dunlop	5.60%	305	305						
UUUP	Jean Bell	3.47%	189							
Electorate: 11,522 Valid: 5,445 (47.26%) Spoilt: 265 Quota: 1,090 Turnout: 5,710 (49.56%)
