= 2005 Lisburn City Council election =

Local government election in Northern Ireland

← 2001	5 May 2005	2011 →

All 30 seats to Lisburn City Council 16 seats needed for a majority
	First party	Second party	Third party
Party	DUP	UUP	Sinn Féin
Seats won	13	7	4
Seat change	▲8	▼6	0
	Fourth party	Fifth party	Sixth party
Party	Alliance	SDLP	Independent
Seats won	3	3	0
Seat change	0	0	▼2
- Party with the most votes by district.

Elections to Lisburn City Council were held on 5 May 2005 on the same day as the other Northern Irish local government elections. The election used five district electoral areas to elect a total of 30 councillors.

== Election results ==
Lisburn City Council Election Result 2005
Party	Seats	Gains	Losses	Net gain/loss	Seats %	Votes %	Votes	+/−
DUP	13	8	0	▲8	43.3	40.7	17,238	▲20.5
UUP	7	0	6	▼6	23.3	22.7	9,625	▼12.5
Sinn Féin	4	0	0	0	13.3	16.6	7,092	▲0.6
Alliance	3	0	0	0	10.0	9.2	3,907	▼1.8
SDLP	3	0	0	0	10.0	8.5	3,894	0.0
NI Conservatives	0	0	0	0	0.0	0.8	333	▼0.6
Green (NI)	0	0	0	0	0.0	0.7	284	▲0.7

Note: "Votes" are the first preference votes.

== Districts summary ==
Results of the Lisburn City Council election, 2005 by district
Ward	%	Cllrs	%	Cllrs	%	Cllrs	%	Cllrs	%	Cllrs	%	Cllrs	Total Cllrs
Ward	DUP		UUP		Sinn Féin		Alliance		SDLP		Others		Total Cllrs
Downshire	48.7	2	36.8	2	1.3	0	13.2	1	0.0	0	0.0	0	5
Dunmurry Cross	13.6	1	6.7	0	58.2	4	0.0	0	21.5	2	0.0	0	7
Killultagh	48.4	3	21.5	1	7.7	0	6.9	0	11.6	1	3.9	0	5
Lisburn Town North	44.6	3	31.8	3	2.3	0	12.7	1	5.8	0	2.8	0	7
Lisburn Town South	59.8	4	17.3	1	2.7	0	17.7	1	2.6	0	0.0	0	6
Total	40.7	13	22.7	7	16.6	4	9.2	3	8.5	3	2.3	0	30

== Districts results ==
=== Downshire ===
2001: 3 x UUP, 1 x DUP, 1 x Alliance
2005: 2 x DUP, 2 x UUP, 1 x Alliance
2001-2005 Change: DUP gain from UUP

Downshire - 5 seats
Party	Candidate	FPv%	Count					
Party	Candidate	FPv%	1	2	3	4	5	6
DUP	Edwin Poots*	23.43%	1,929					
UUP	Basil McCrea	19.45%	1,601					
DUP	Allan Ewart	18.25%	1,502					
UUP	William Ward*	7.73%	636	672.54	710.48	888.5	890.34	1,421.13
Alliance	Elizabeth Campbell*	13.20%	1,087	1,097.44	1,123.62	1,221.84	1,222.8	1,325.67
DUP	Joseph Lockhart	7.01%	577	1,008.52	1,017.62	1,040.93	1,153.81	1,247.23
UUP	James Baird*	6.79%	559	603.37	674.91	780.97	783.45	
UUP	William Scott	2.88%	237	257.01	330.79			
Sinn Féin	David Hall	1.26%	104	105.16	105.44			
Electorate: 12,797 Valid: 8,232 (64.33%) Spoilt: 114 Quota: 1,373 Turnout: 8,346 (65.22%)

=== Dunmurry Cross ===
2001: 4 x Sinn Féin, 2 x SDLP, 1 x UUP
2005: 4 x Sinn Féin, 2 x SDLP, 1 x DUP
2001-2005 Change: DUP gain from UUP

Dunmurry Cross - 7 seats
Party	Candidate	FPv%	Count				
Party	Candidate	FPv%	1	2	3	4	5
Sinn Féin	Paul Butler*	17.12%	1,823				
Sinn Féin	Michael Ferguson*	13.75%	1,464				
DUP	Stephen Moore	13.08%	1,393				
SDLP	Patricia Lewsley*	12.86%	1,369				
SDLP	Brian Heading	7.83%	834	898.12	909.82	1,268.31	1,326.81
Sinn Féin	Angela Nelson	9.48%	1,010	1,196.2	1,220.86	1,229.22	1,229.97
Sinn Féin	Veronica Willis*	8.83%	940	1,142.72	1,222.01	1,222.01	1,222.01
Sinn Féin	Máireád Uí Adhmaill	10.56%	1,125	1,157.48	1,167.11	1,168.11	1,168.11
UUP	Kenneth Bishop	6.49%	691	693.52	694.33		
Electorate: 17,676 Valid: 10,649 (60.25%) Spoilt: 309 Quota: 1,332 Turnout: 10,958 (61.99%)

=== Killultagh ===
2001: 2 x UUP, 2 x DUP, 1 x SDLP
2005: 3 x DUP, 1 x UUP, 1 x SDLP
2001-2005 Change: DUP gain from UUP

Killultagh - 5 seats
Party	Candidate	FPv%	Count						
Party	Candidate	FPv%	1	2	3	4	5	6	7
DUP	Thomas Beckett	20.77%	1,751						
SDLP	Peter O'Hagan*	11.59%	977	978.33	986.33	1,003.33	1,531.33		
UUP	Jim Dillon*	12.41%	1,046	1,054.17	1,164.17	1,243.55	1,246.74	1,252.34	1,560.34
DUP	Cecil Calvert*	12.44%	1,049	1,304.74	1,322.69	1,373.26	1,379.26	1,379.61	1,436.61
DUP	James Tinsley*	15.17%	1,279	1,333.15	1,343.72	1,367.1	1,367.1	1,370.25	1,471.25
Alliance	Owen Gawith	6.86%	578	579.52	600.71	678.71	714.71	824.96	928.96
UUP	Samuel Johnston*	5.46%	460	463.8	584.56	654.56	656.56	661.11	
Sinn Féin	Chris Donnelly	7.73%	652	652.38	652.38	653.38			
NI Conservatives	Neil Johnston	3.95%	333	334.71	348.71				
UUP	David Greene	3.63%	306	308.85					
Electorate: 14,029 Valid: 8,431 (60.10%) Spoilt: 122 Quota: 1,406 Turnout: 8,553 (60.97%)

=== Lisburn Town North ===
2001: 4 x UUP, 1 x Alliance, 1 x DUP, 1 x Independent
2005: 3 x DUP, 3 x UUP, 1 x Alliance
2001-2005 Change: DUP (two seats) gain from UUP and Independent

Lisburn Town North - 7 seats
Party	Candidate	FPv%	Count									
Party	Candidate	FPv%	1	2	3	4	5	6	7	8	9	10
DUP	Jonathan Craig*	18.33%	1,794									
DUP	Paul Givan	15.39%	1,506									
DUP	William Leathem	10.87%	1,064	1,556.8								
Alliance	Trevor Lunn*	11.04%	1,080	1,083.84	1,099.84	1,120.36	1,250.36					
UUP	Ronnie Crawford*	7.76%	759	777.88	817.24	869.89	875.24	877.24	908.28	1,035.81	1,039.41	1,097.37
UUP	David Archer*	6.58%	644	660.64	796.32	864.63	867.22	867.22	894.13	983.37	986.49	1,068.57
UUP	William Gardiner-Watson*	6.93%	678	687.6	720.88	757.06	762.7	762.7	782.47	922.54	930.94	1,006.73
UUP	Kenneth Armstrong	6.61%	647	662.04	701.08	752.38	753.24	754.56	778.19	871.86	875.94	920.08
SDLP	John Drake	5.80%	568	569.28	573.44	575.33	580.6	763.6	852.92	866.46	873.42	
UUP	Ellen Hillen	3.87%	379	385.08	415.48	448.42	452.69	452.69	502.98			
Green (NI)	Michael Rogan	2.90%	284	286.56	300.32	314.9	323.49	343.49				
Sinn Féin	Jacqui Currie	2.27%	222	222.32	222.96	222.96	222.96					
Alliance	Frazer McCammond	1.64%	160	160.64	162.24	165.48						
Electorate: 16,325 Valid: 9,785 (59.94%) Spoilt: 199 Quota: 1,224 Turnout: 9,984 (61.16%)

=== Lisburn Town South ===
2001: 3 x UUP, 1 x Alliance, 1 x DUP, 1 x Independent
2005: 4 x DUP, 1 x UUP, 1 x Alliance
2001-2005 Change: DUP (three seats) gain from UUP (two seats) and Independent

Lisburn Town South - 6 seats
Party	Candidate	FPv%	Count					
Party	Candidate	FPv%	1	2	3	4	5	6
DUP	Jeffrey Donaldson	37.16%	2,109					
Alliance	Seamus Close*	17.65%	1,002					
DUP	Andrew Ewing	5.55%	315	918.54				
DUP	Paul Porter*	9.69%	550	813.34				
UUP	Ivan Davis*	10.34%	587	711.11	773.31	776.17	782.8	862.8
DUP	Jenny Palmer	7.40%	420	629.79	642.39	736	739.94	783.24
UUP	Thomas Archer*	4.03%	229	278.14	301.74	303.06	303.06	375.53
SDLP	Yvonne Byrne	2.57%	146	151.67	213.27	213.27	346.47	351.07
UUP	Denis Troughton	2.92%	166	198.13	216.13	218.88	220.08	
Sinn Féin	Martin Parker	2.68%	152	155.78	161.18	161.51		
Electorate: 10,869 Valid: 5,676 (52.22%) Spoilt: 144 Quota: 811 Turnout: 5,820 (53.55%)
