= 1973 Lisburn Borough Council election =

Local government election in Northern Ireland

30 May 1973	1977 →

All 23 seats to Lisburn Borough Council 12 seats needed for a majority
	First party	Second party	Third party
Party	UUP	DUP	Alliance
Seats won	14	4	3
	Fourth party	Fifth party
Party	Vanguard	SDLP
Seats won	1	1

Elections to Lisburn Borough Council were held on 30 May 1973 on the same day as the other Northern Irish local government elections. The election used five district electoral areas to elect a total of 23 councillors.

== Election results ==
Party	Seats	±	First Pref. votes	FPv%	±%
UUP	14		15,979	48.9	
DUP	4		5,482	16.8	
Alliance	3		5,916	18.1	
Vanguard	1		2,166	6.6	
SDLP	1		1,721	5.3	
NI Labour	0		749	2.3	
Independent	0		445	1.4	
Ind. Unionist	0		204	0.6	
Totals	23		32,662	100.0	—

== Districts summary ==
Results of the Lisburn Borough Council election, 1973 by district
Ward	%	Cllrs	%	Cllrs	%	Cllrs	%	Cllrs	%	Cllrs	%	Cllrs	Total Cllrs
Ward	UUP		DUP		Alliance		Vanguard		SDLP		Others		Total Cllrs
Area A	52.7	3	16.5	0	8.5	0	0.0	0	17.8	1	4.5	0	4
Area B	57.1	4	19.5	1	13.4	0	10.0	0	0.0	0	0.0	0	5
Area C	38.3	2	20.4	1	12.9	1	13.2	1	6.2	0	9.0	0	5
Area D	50.9	3	10.7	1	24.8	1	7.2	0	5.0	0	1.4	0	5
Area E	48.5	2	18.7	1	26.2	1	0.0	0	0.0	0	6.6	0	4
Total	48.9	14	16.8	4	18.1	3	6.6	1	5.3	1	4.3	0	23

== Districts results ==
=== Area A ===
1973: 3 x UUP, 1 x SDLP

Lisburn Area A - 4 seats
Party	Candidate	FPv%	Count							
Party	Candidate	FPv%	1	2	3	4	5	6	7	8
UUP	John Maze	18.43%	857	876	919	1,003				
SDLP	Patrick Ritchie	17.83%	829	857	861	970				
UUP	George McCartney	16.07%	747	759	768	808	940			
UUP	Thomas Wilson	11.51%	535	536	560	588	776	832	868	876.8
DUP	Charles Woodburne	16.54%	769	769	817	827	855	863	865	865.4
UUP	William Moore	6.73%	313	316	354	381				
Alliance	James Megarry	4.54%	211	330	337					
Ind. Unionist	Henry Stewart	4.39%	204	205						
Alliance	Patrick Dorrian	3.96%	184							
Electorate: 7,210 Valid: 4,649 (64.48%) Spoilt: 58 Quota: 930 Turnout: 4,707 (65.28%)

=== Area B ===
1973: 4 x UUP, 1 x DUP

Lisburn Area B - 5 seats
Party	Candidate	FPv%	Count							
Party	Candidate	FPv%	1	2	3	4	5	6	7	8
UUP	David Titterington	19.70%	1,102							
DUP	Charles Poots	19.46%	1,089							
UUP	Elsie Kelsey	17.23%	964							
UUP	James Lilley	9.85%	551	607.55	621.83	640.64	648.56	659.42	678.93	864.41
UUP	Ivan McKeever	10.35%	579	660	674.98	682.48	684.96	697.93	714.56	857.02
Alliance	Oliver Hunter	8.10%	453	457.95	459.49	460.18	542.66	715.93	721.21	733.28
Vanguard	Robert Rush	5.42%	303	311.1	388.8	389.34	389.34	390.48	648.28	
Vanguard	David Williamson	4.61%	258	263.85	302.49	302.85	306.18	308.13		
Alliance	Nancy McIntyre	2.81%	157	159.55	160.11	160.62	204.4			
Alliance	Moore Sinnerton	2.48%	139	141.25	142.37	142.52				
Electorate: 9,328 Valid: 5,595 (59.98%) Spoilt: 87 Quota: 933 Turnout: 5,682 (60.91%)

=== Area C ===
1973: 2 x UUP, 1 x DUP, 1 x Alliance, 1 x Vanguard

Lisburn Area C - 5 seats
Party	Candidate	FPv%	Count									
Party	Candidate	FPv%	1	2	3	4	5	6	7	8	9	10
DUP	William Belshaw	16.53%	1,222	1,230	1,231	1,234						
UUP	Norman Bicker	12.57%	929	953	955	955	966	975	1,062	1,107	1,298	
UUP	James McKeown	12.20%	902	954	956	960	984	988	1,026	1,171	1,283	
Alliance	Seamus Close	8.17%	604	607	661	727	727	943	946	950	1,027	1,486
Vanguard	George Morrison	9.57%	707	712	712	713	921	926	1,072	1,081	1,136	1,140
UUP	William Gardiner-Watson	7.28%	538	563	567	575	580	593	618	701	776	780
SDLP	Peter O'Hagan	6.18%	457	457	461	551	551	561	561	561	572	
Independent	Robert Allen	6.02%	445	447	454	470	475	501	534	551		
UUP	William Matthews	4.07%	301	334	334	336	337	348	361			
DUP	David Shanks	3.91%	289	294	294	295	310	310				
Alliance	W. Ferris	2.50%	185	185	269	295	297					
Vanguard	Thomas Herron	3.67%	271	273	273	273						
NI Labour	A. Whitby	2.90%	214	215	224							
Alliance	W. G. Hammond	2.25%	166	167								
UUP	Harold McClure	2.18%	161									
Electorate: 13,617 Valid: 7,391 (54.28%) Spoilt: 127 Quota: 1,232 Turnout: 7,518 (55.21%)

=== Area D ===
1973: 3 x UUP, 1 x DUP, 1 x Alliance

Lisburn Area D - 5 seats
Party	Candidate	FPv%	Count									
Party	Candidate	FPv%	1	2	3	4	5	6	7	8	9	10
UUP	Samuel Semple	26.52%	2,294									
UUP	Robert Kirkwood	13.02%	1,126	1,508.58								
Alliance	G. W. C. McCartney	14.36%	1,242	1,282.33	1,285.75	1,325.75	1,325.75	1,333.41	1,353.27	1,506.27		
DUP	Ivan Davis	10.66%	922	955.3	957.52	958.89	993.29	995.09	1,008.06	1,015.49	1,025.49	1,479.49
UUP	William Henry	9.19%	795	974.08	1,000.24	1,005.67	1,009.58	1,083.64	1,324.76	1,337.65	1,341.02	1,432.33
Alliance	George Boyd	6.97%	603	613.73	614.51	632.88	632.88	635.62	641.82	783.9	1,131.27	1,138.7
Vanguard	James Davis	5.61%	485	501.28	502.3	502.3	605.32	609.11	613.46	613.89	614.89	
SDLP	P. J. Rowen	5.03%	435	436.11	436.11	463.11	463.11	463.11	463.11	469.48		
Alliance	Hazel Ervine	3.47%	300	305.55	305.85	319.85	320.22	322.34	328			
UUP	Myrtle McMaster	1.04%	90	220.98	233.82	236.19	240.25	303.93				
UUP	James Hutchinson	1.17%	101	138.37	152.65	156.77	159.51					
Vanguard	Marjorie Lockhart	1.64%	142	150.88	151.3	152.3						
NI Labour	R. N. Hill	1.34%	116	117.48	117.66							
Electorate: 10,564 Valid: 8,651 (81.89%) Spoilt: 72 Quota: 1,442 Turnout: 8,723 (82.57%)

=== Area E ===
1973: 2 x UUP, 1 x Alliance, 1 x DUP

Lisburn Area E - 4 seats
Party	Candidate	FPv%	Count						
Party	Candidate	FPv%	1	2	3	4	5	6	7
UUP	John Gilchrist	23.20%	1,479						
Alliance	John Cousins	18.38%	1,172	1,177.99	1,185.63	1,447.63			
UUP	Walter Groves	13.68%	872	981.72	1,072	1,093.26	1,096.1	1,126.49	1,613.49
DUP	Robert McNeice	11.29%	720	727.02	754.54	760.8	761.51	1,193.07	1,266.46
Alliance	J. W. Patterson	7.84%	500	504.55	514.59	610.85	774.86	783.86	827.56
UUP	Samuel Neill	7.36%	469	516.06	639.22	649.61	651.74	670.26	
DUP	Henry Winton	7.39%	471	472.95	491.47	491.47	491.47		
NI Labour	W. J. B. McIldoon	6.57%	419	420.04	426.17				
UUP	Elizabeth Wright	4.30%	274	288.95					
Electorate: 10,414 Valid: 6,376 (61.23%) Spoilt: 103 Quota: 1,276 Turnout: 6,479 (62.21%)
