= Lisburn Area C =

District electoral areas in Lisburn, Northern Ireland

Lisburn Area C was one of the five district electoral areas in Lisburn, Northern Ireland which existed from 1973 to 1985. The district elected five members to Lisburn Borough Council, and formed part of the South Antrim constituencies for the Northern Ireland Assembly and UK Parliament.

It was created for the 1973 local elections, and contained the wards of Blaris, Hillhall, Knockmore, Lagan Valley and Old Warren. It was abolished for the 1985 local elections and mainly replaced by the Lisburn Town DEA, with Blaris moving to the Downshire DEA and Knockmore moving to the Killultagh DEA.

== Councillors ==
Election	Councillor (Party)	Councillor (Party)	Councillor (Party)	Councillor (Party)	Councillor (Party)
1981	William Belshaw (DUP)	Denis McCarroll (DUP)	Robert Dunsmore (DUP)	William Gardiner-Watson (UUP)	Seamus Close (Alliance)
1977	William Belshaw (DUP)	George Morrison (UUUP)/ (Vanguard)	Wilfred McClung (UUP)	William Gardiner-Watson (UUP)	Seamus Close (Alliance)
1973	William Belshaw (DUP)	George Morrison (UUUP)/ (Vanguard)	Norman Bicker (UUP)	James McKeown (UUP)	Seamus Close (Alliance)

== 1981 Election ==
1977: 2 x UUP, 1 x DUP, 1 x Alliance, 1 x UUUP

1981: 3 x DUP, 1 x UUP, 1 x Alliance

1977-1981 Change: DUP (two seats) gain from UUP and UUUP

Lisburn Area C - 5 seats
Party	Candidate	FPv%	Count						
Party	Candidate	FPv%	1	2	3	4	5	6	7
DUP	William Belshaw*	35.49%	2,412						
DUP	Denis McCarroll	12.60%	856	1,290.6					
DUP	Robert Dunsmore	6.22%	423	979.5	989.56	1,110.4	1,189.4		
UUP	William Gardiner-Watson*	11.95%	812	884.61	889.67	895.75	1,011.89	1,221.89	
Alliance	Seamus Close*	11.93%	811	826.37	890.55	891.69	979	1,002.28	1,007.88
UUP	Wilfred McClung*	8.61%	585	632.17	634.23	641.07	683.74	863.24	945.56
UUUP	George Morrison*	5.90%	401	488.45	494.51	509.33	581.25		
Independent	William Whitley	5.72%	389	430.34	446.87	451.43			
NI Labour	Robert Clarke	1.57%	107	115.48					
Electorate: 11,569 Valid: 6,796 (58.74%) Spoilt: 196 Quota: 1,133 Turnout: 6,992 (60.44%)

== 1977 Election ==
1973: 2 x UUP, 1 x DUP, 1 x Alliance, 1 x Vanguard

1977: 2 x UUP, 1 x DUP, 1 x Alliance, 1 x UUUP

1973-1977 Change: Vanguard joins UUUP

Lisburn Area C - 5 seats
Party	Candidate	FPv%	Count				
Party	Candidate	FPv%	1	2	3	4	5
DUP	William Belshaw*	26.53%	1,388				
Alliance	Seamus Close*	18.68%	987				
UUP	William Gardiner-Watson	17.09%	894				
UUUP	George Morrison*	13.46%	704	783.92	796.4	804.91	934.91
UUP	Wilfred McClung	8.61%	397	416.98	499.35	575.02	787.35
DUP	Denis McCarroll	4.45%	233	573.77	577.14	580.13	689.82
Vanguard	Ronnie Crawford	8.43%	441	499.83	524.2	550.65	
Alliance	Thomas Hughes	3.59%	188	190.59			
Electorate: 11,377 Valid: 5,232 (45.99%) Spoilt: 224 Quota: 873 Turnout: 5,456 (47.96%)

== 1973 Election ==
1973: 2 x UUP, 1 x DUP, 1 x Alliance, 1 x Vanguard

Lisburn Area C - 5 seats
Party	Candidate	FPv%	Count									
Party	Candidate	FPv%	1	2	3	4	5	6	7	8	9	10
DUP	William Belshaw	16.53%	1,222	1,230	1,231	1,234						
UUP	Norman Bicker	12.57%	929	953	955	955	966	975	1,062	1,107	1,298	
UUP	James McKeown	12.20%	902	954	956	960	984	988	1,026	1,171	1,283	
Alliance	Seamus Close	8.17%	604	607	661	727	727	943	946	950	1,027	1,486
Vanguard	George Morrison	9.57%	707	712	712	713	921	926	1,072	1,081	1,136	1,140
UUP	William Gardiner-Watson	7.28%	538	563	567	575	580	593	618	701	776	780
SDLP	Peter O'Hagan	6.18%	457	457	461	551	551	561	561	561	572	
Independent	Robert Allen	6.02%	445	447	454	470	475	501	534	551		
UUP	William Matthews	4.07%	301	334	334	336	337	348	361			
DUP	David Shanks	3.91%	289	294	294	295	310	310				
Alliance	W. Ferris	2.50%	185	185	269	295	297					
Vanguard	Thomas Herron	3.67%	271	273	273	273						
NI Labour	A. Whitby	2.90%	214	215	224							
Alliance	W. G. Hammond	2.25%	166	167								
UUP	Harold McClure	2.18%	161									
Electorate: 13,617 Valid: 7,391 (54.28%) Spoilt: 127 Quota: 1,232 Turnout: 7,518 (55.21%)
