= Lisburn Area B =

District electoral areas in Lisburn, Northern Ireland

Lisburn Area B was one of the five district electoral areas in Lisburn, Northern Ireland which existed from 1973 to 1985. The district elected five members to Lisburn Borough Council, and formed part of the South Antrim constituencies for the Northern Ireland Assembly and UK Parliament.

It was created for the 1973 local elections, and contained the wards of Ballymacbrennan, Dromara, Drumbo, Hillsborough and Maze. It was abolished for the 1985 local elections and replaced by the Downshire DEA.

== Councillors ==
| Election | Councillor (Party) | Councillor (Party) | Councillor (Party) | Councillor (Party) | Councillor (Party) |
|---|---|---|---|---|---|
| 1981 | Charles Poots (DUP) | Samuel Dorman (DUP) | James McCann (DUP) | Thomas Lilburn (UUP) | William Bleakes (UUP) |
| 1977 | Charles Poots (DUP) | Samuel Dorman (DUP) | Elsie Kelsey (UUP) | Thomas Lilburn (UUP) | William Bleakes (UUP) |
| 1973 | Charles Poots (DUP) | David Titterington (UUP) | Elsie Kelsey (UUP) | James Lilley (UUP) | Ivan McKeever (UUP) |

== 1981 Election ==
1977: 3 x UUP, 2 x DUP

1981: 3 x DUP, 2 x UUP

1977-1981 Change: DUP gain from UUP

Lisburn Area B - 5 seats
| Party | Candidate | FPv% | Count | | | | | |
| Party | Candidate | FPv% | 1 | 2 | 3 | 4 | 5 | 6 |
|---|---|---|---|---|---|---|---|---|
| DUP | Charles Poots* | 25.09% | 1,469 | | | | | |
| UUP | William Bleakes* | 20.87% | 1,222 | | | | | |
| UUP | Thomas Lilburn* | 11.19% | 655 | 697.57 | 843.77 | 965.88 | 1,356.88 | |
| DUP | Samuel Dorman* | 10.59% | 620 | 789.62 | 825.22 | 850.59 | 891.39 | 956.39 |
| DUP | James McCann | 8.01% | 469 | 688.45 | 697.05 | 760.62 | 827.96 | 891.96 |
| Alliance | John Alderdice | 10.64% | 623 | 625.97 | 639.57 | 701.5 | 741.55 | 828.55 |
| UUP | Joseph McCullough | 7.63% | 447 | 479.34 | 509.54 | 582.25 | | |
| Independent | William Johnston | 5.99% | 351 | 364.2 | 370.4 | | | |
Electorate: 9,350 Valid: 5,856 (62.63%) Spoilt: 121 Quota: 977 Turnout: 5,977 (63.93%)

== 1977 Election ==
1973: 4 x UUP, 1 x DUP

1977: 2 x UUP, 2 x DUP, 1 x UUUP

1973-1977 Change: DUP and UUUP gains from UUP

Lisburn Area B - 5 seats
| Party | Candidate | FPv% | Count | | | | |
| Party | Candidate | FPv% | 1 | 2 | 3 | 4 | 5 |
|---|---|---|---|---|---|---|---|
| DUP | Charles Poots* | 27.05% | 1,174 | | | | |
| DUP | Samuel Dorman | 7.33% | 318 | 677.19 | 778.19 | | |
| UUP | Thomas Lilburn | 12.05% | 523 | 537.82 | 558.94 | 733.54 | |
| UUP | Elsie Kelsey* | 12.63% | 548 | 558.53 | 586.55 | 710.25 | 729.25 |
| UUUP | William Bleakes | 13.96% | 606 | 618.09 | 638.99 | 681.67 | 707.67 |
| Alliance | Moore Sinnerton | 15.12% | 656 | 657.95 | 660.73 | 673.51 | 675.51 |
| UUP | James Lilley* | 7.70% | 334 | 352.72 | 372.4 | | |
| UUUP | John Curry | 4.17% | 181 | 211.42 | | | |
Electorate: 8,866 Valid: 4,340 (48.95%) Spoilt: 108 Quota: 724 Turnout: 4,448 (50.17%)

== 1973 Election ==
1973: 4 x UUP, 1 x DUP

Lisburn Area B - 5 seats
| Party | Candidate | FPv% | Count | | | | | | | |
| Party | Candidate | FPv% | 1 | 2 | 3 | 4 | 5 | 6 | 7 | 8 |
|---|---|---|---|---|---|---|---|---|---|---|
| UUP | David Titterington | 19.70% | 1,102 | | | | | | | |
| DUP | Charles Poots | 19.46% | 1,089 | | | | | | | |
| UUP | Elsie Kelsey | 17.23% | 964 | | | | | | | |
| UUP | James Lilley | 9.85% | 551 | 607.55 | 621.83 | 640.64 | 648.56 | 659.42 | 678.93 | 864.41 |
| UUP | Ivan McKeever | 10.35% | 579 | 660 | 674.98 | 682.48 | 684.96 | 697.93 | 714.56 | 857.02 |
| Alliance | Oliver Hunter | 8.10% | 453 | 457.95 | 459.49 | 460.18 | 542.66 | 715.93 | 721.21 | 733.28 |
| Vanguard | Robert Rush | 5.42% | 303 | 311.1 | 388.8 | 389.34 | 389.34 | 390.48 | 648.28 | |
| Vanguard | David Williamson | 4.61% | 258 | 263.85 | 302.49 | 302.85 | 306.18 | 308.13 | | |
| Alliance | Nancy McIntyre | 2.81% | 157 | 159.55 | 160.11 | 160.62 | 204.4 | | | |
| Alliance | Moore Sinnerton | 2.48% | 139 | 141.25 | 142.37 | 142.52 | | | | |
Electorate: 9,328 Valid: 5,595 (59.98%) Spoilt: 87 Quota: 933 Turnout: 5,682 (60.91%)
