= Lisburn Area E =

District electoral areas in Lisburn, Northern Ireland

Lisburn Area E was one of the five district electoral areas in Lisburn, Northern Ireland which existed from 1973 to 1985. The district elected five members to Lisburn Borough Council, and formed part of the South Antrim constituencies for the Northern Ireland Assembly and UK Parliament.

It was created for the 1973 local elections, and contained the wards of Collin, Derryaghy, Dunmurry and Seymour Hill. It was abolished for the 1985 local elections and replaced by the Dunmurry Cross DEA.

== Councillors ==
Election	Councillor (Party)	Councillor (Party)	Councillor (Party)	Councillor (Party)
1981	William Beattie (DUP)	William McAllister (UUP)	William McDonnell (SDLP)	James Davis (UUUP)
1977	William Beattie (DUP)	William McAllister (UUP)	William McDonnell (SDLP)	John Cousins (Alliance)
1973	Robert McNeice (DUP)	John Gilchrist (UUP)	Walter Groves (UUP)	John Cousins (Alliance)

== 1981 Election ==
1977: 1 x Alliance, 1 x UUP, 1 x DUP, 1 x SDLP

1981: 1 x DUP, 1 x UUP, 1 x SDLP, 1 x UUUP

1977-1981 Change: UUUP gain from Alliance

Lisburn Area E - 4 seats
Party	Candidate	FPv%	Count					
Party	Candidate	FPv%	1	2	3	4	5	6
DUP	William Beattie*	29.98%	1,909					
UUP	William McAllister*	28.74%	1,830					
SDLP	William McDonnell*	15.91%	1,013	1,013.74	1,014.73	1,036.73	1,197.1	1,220.47
UUUP	James Davis	1.65%	105	674.43	1,096.17	1,099.31	1,100.64	1,158.97
Alliance	John Cousins*	8.51%	542	566.42	611.3	619.74	691.4	1,100.58
Alliance	Brian Fitzsimons	6.83%	435	463.49	534.77	537.1	552.13	
Republican Clubs	Gerard Dunlop	7.26%	462	464.22	468.18	487.18		
Communist	Terry Bruton	1.13%	72	76.07	77.72			
Electorate: 12,242 Valid: 6,368 (52.02%) Spoilt: 463 Quota: 1,274 Turnout: 6,831 (55.80%)

== 1977 Election ==
1973: 2 x UUP, 1 x Alliance, 1 x DUP

1977: 1 x Alliance, 1 x UUP, 1 x DUP, 1 x SDLP

1973-1977 Change: SDLP gain from UUP

Lisburn Area E - 4 seats
Party	Candidate	FPv%	Count							
Party	Candidate	FPv%	1	2	3	4	5	6	7	8
Alliance	John Cousins*	19.23%	1,047	1,053	1,113					
UUP	William McAllister	18.49%	1,007	1,061	1,064	1,402				
SDLP	William McDonnell	16.09%	876	876	989	990	990	1,145		
DUP	William Beattie	11.57%	630	683	683	705	776	822	833.16	835.16
DUP	Robert McNeice*	9.70%	528	558	558	604	699	777	820.71	828.71
Alliance	Brian Fitzsimons	8.17%	445	451	473	494	584			
UUP	David Saulters	7.68%	418	444	444					
Republican Clubs	Gerard Dunlop	5.60%	305	305						
UUUP	Jean Bell	3.47%	189							
Electorate: 11,522 Valid: 5,445 (47.26%) Spoilt: 265 Quota: 1,090 Turnout: 5,710 (49.56%)

== 1973 Election ==
1973: 2 x UUP, 1 x Alliance, 1 x DUP

Lisburn Area E - 4 seats
Party	Candidate	FPv%	Count						
Party	Candidate	FPv%	1	2	3	4	5	6	7
UUP	John Gilchrist	23.20%	1,479						
Alliance	John Cousins	18.38%	1,172	1,177.99	1,185.63	1,447.63			
UUP	Walter Groves	13.68%	872	981.72	1,072	1,093.26	1,096.1	1,126.49	1,613.49
DUP	Robert McNeice	11.29%	720	727.02	754.54	760.8	761.51	1,193.07	1,266.46
Alliance	J. W. Patterson	7.84%	500	504.55	514.59	610.85	774.86	783.86	827.56
UUP	Samuel Neill	7.36%	469	516.06	639.22	649.61	651.74	670.26	
DUP	Henry Winton	7.39%	471	472.95	491.47	491.47	491.47		
NI Labour	W. J. B. McIldoon	6.57%	419	420.04	426.17				
UUP	Elizabeth Wright	4.30%	274	288.95					
Electorate: 10,414 Valid: 6,376 (61.23%) Spoilt: 103 Quota: 1,276 Turnout: 6,479 (62.21%)
