= Lisburn Area A =

District electoral areas in Lisburn, Northern Ireland

Lisburn Area A was one of the five district electoral areas in Lisburn, Northern Ireland which existed from 1973 to 1985. The district elected four members to Lisburn Borough Council, and formed part of the South Antrim constituencies for the Northern Ireland Assembly and UK Parliament.

It was created for the 1973 local elections, and contained the wards of Glenavy, Magheragall, Moira and Tullyrusk. It was abolished for the 1985 local elections and replaced by the Killultagh DEA.

== Councillors ==
| Election | Councillor (Party) | Councillor (Party) | Councillor (Party) | Councillor (Party) |
|---|---|---|---|---|
| 1981 | Jim Wells (DUP) | Ronald Campbell (UUP) | Jim Dillon (UUP) | John Clenaghan (SDLP) |
| 1977 | Charles Woodburne (DUP) | Ronald Campbell (UUP) | Jim Dillon (UUP) | John Clenaghan (SDLP) |
| 1973 | John Maze (UUP) | George McCartney (UUP) | Thomas Wilson (UUP) | Patrick Ritchie (SDLP) |

== 1981 Election ==
1977: 2 x UUP, 1 x DUP, 1 x SDLP

1981: 2 x UUP, 1 x DUP, 1 x SDLP

1977-1981 Change: No change

Lisburn Area A - 4 seats
| Party | Candidate | FPv% | Count | | | | |
| Party | Candidate | FPv% | 1 | 2 | 3 | 4 | 5 |
|---|---|---|---|---|---|---|---|
| UUP | Ronald Campbell* | 25.81% | 1,299 | | | | |
| DUP | Jim Wells | 19.95% | 1,004 | | | | |
| UUP | Jim Dillon* | 18.20% | 916 | 1,129.21 | | | |
| SDLP | John Clenaghan* | 17.98% | 905 | 913.97 | 915.65 | 915.86 | 932.28 |
| DUP | Charles Woodburne* | 10.23% | 515 | 527.19 | 537.55 | 548.68 | 842.47 |
| UUP | Henry Stewart | 7.83% | 394 | 429.65 | 539.13 | 545.01 | |
Electorate: 7,983 Valid: 5,033 (63.05%) Spoilt: 109 Quota: 1,007 Turnout: 5,142 (64.41%)

== 1977 Election ==
1973: 3 x UUP, 1 x SDLP

1977: 2 x UUP, 1 x DUP, 1 x SDLP

1973-1977 Change: DUP gain from UUP

Lisburn Area A - 4 seats
| Party | Candidate | FPv% | Count | | |
| Party | Candidate | FPv% | 1 | 2 | 3 |
|---|---|---|---|---|---|
| UUP | Ronald Campbell | 25.72% | 889 | | |
| DUP | Charles Woodburne | 20.11% | 695 | | |
| SDLP | John Clenaghan | 19.88% | 687 | 691.62 | 828.62 |
| UUP | Jim Dillon | 14.27% | 493 | 634.46 | 733.46 |
| UUP | Henry Stewart | 9.90% | 342 | 371.92 | 447.72 |
| Alliance | Patrick Dorrian | 7.00% | 242 | 245.52 | |
| UUUP | Henry Sloan | 3.13% | 108 | 118.56 | |
Electorate: 7,040 Valid: 3,456 (49.09%) Spoilt: 174 Quota: 692 Turnout: 3,630 (51.56%)

== 1973 Election ==
1973: 3 x UUP, 1 x SDLP

Lisburn Area A - 4 seats
| Party | Candidate | FPv% | Count | | | | | | | |
| Party | Candidate | FPv% | 1 | 2 | 3 | 4 | 5 | 6 | 7 | 8 |
|---|---|---|---|---|---|---|---|---|---|---|
| UUP | John Maze | 18.43% | 857 | 876 | 919 | 1,003 | | | | |
| SDLP | Patrick Ritchie | 17.83% | 829 | 857 | 861 | 970 | | | | |
| UUP | George McCartney | 16.07% | 747 | 759 | 768 | 808 | 940 | | | |
| UUP | Thomas Wilson | 11.51% | 535 | 536 | 560 | 588 | 776 | 832 | 868 | 876.8 |
| DUP | Charles Woodburne | 16.54% | 769 | 769 | 817 | 827 | 855 | 863 | 865 | 865.4 |
| UUP | William Moore | 6.73% | 313 | 316 | 354 | 381 | | | | |
| Alliance | James Megarry | 4.54% | 211 | 330 | 337 | | | | | |
| Ind. Unionist | Henry Stewart | 4.39% | 204 | 205 | | | | | | |
| Alliance | Patrick Dorrian | 3.96% | 184 | | | | | | | |
Electorate: 7,210 Valid: 4,649 (64.48%) Spoilt: 58 Quota: 930 Turnout: 4,707 (65.28%)
