= Lisburn Area D =

District electoral areas in Lisburn, Northern Ireland

Lisburn Area D was one of the five district electoral areas in Lisburn, Northern Ireland which existed from 1973 to 1985. The district elected five members to Lisburn Borough Council, and formed part of the South Antrim constituencies for the Northern Ireland Assembly and UK Parliament.

It was created for the 1973 local elections, and contained the wards of Hilden, Lambeg, Lisnagarvey, Magheralave and Tonagh. It was abolished for the 1985 local elections with 4 of the wards going to Lisburn Town DEA and Lambeg to the Dunmurry Cross DEA.

== Councillors ==
Election	Councillor (Party)	Councillor (Party)	Councillor (Party)	Councillor (Party)	Councillor (Party)
1981	Ivan Davis (DUP)	Robert McNeice (DUP)	Samuel Semple (UUP)	Maureen McKinney (UUP)	George Boyd (Alliance)
1977	Ivan Davis (DUP)	Robert Kirkwood (UPNI)/ (UUP)	Samuel Semple (UUP)	Maureen McKinney (UUP)	George Boyd (Alliance)
1973	Ivan Davis (DUP)	Robert Kirkwood (UPNI)/ (UUP)	Samuel Semple (UUP)	William Henry (UUP)	G. W. C. McCartney (Alliance)

== 1981 Election ==
1977: 2 x UUP, 1 x DUP, 1 x Alliance, 1 x UPNI

1981: 2 x DUP, 2 x UUP, 1 x Alliance

1977-1981 Change: DUP gain from UPNI

Lisburn Area D - 5 seats
Party	Candidate	FPv%	Count						
Party	Candidate	FPv%	1	2	3	4	5	6	7
DUP	Ivan Davis*	44.02%	3,720						
DUP	Robert McNeice	5.56%	470	2,105.84					
UUP	Samuel Semple*	12.65%	1,069	1,313.48	1,630.28				
UUP	Maureen McKinney*	9.32%	788	963.36	1,090.56	1,156.81	1,264.48	1,437.38	
Alliance	George Boyd*	12.85%	1,086	1,125.68	1,138.58	1,140.33	1,178.5	1,204.89	1,665.89
UUP	David Trimble	5.37%	454	494.96	565.16	683.41	764.25	903.76	903.76
Alliance	James Mulholland	5.67%	479	498.84	503.94	504.94	520.36	535.35	
UUUP	John Curry	1.81%	153	246.44	373.04	393.29	455.76		
Unionist Party NI	David Gordon	2.75%	232	291.52	327.22	334.47			
Electorate: 14,016 Valid: 8,451 (60.30%) Spoilt: 158 Quota: 1,409 Turnout: 8,639 (61.64%)

== 1977 Election ==
1973: 3 x UUP, 1 x DUP, 1 x Alliance

1977: 2 x UUP, 1 x DUP, 1 x Alliance, 1 x UPNI

1973-1977 Change: UPNI gain from UUP

Lisburn Area D - 5 seats
Party	Candidate	FPv%	Count					
Party	Candidate	FPv%	1	2	3	4	5	6
DUP	Ivan Davis*	25.77%	1,758					
Unionist Party NI	Robert Kirkwood*	21.76%	1,485					
Alliance	George Boyd	17.85%	1,218					
UUP	Samuel Semple*	13.92%	950	1,055.08	1,184.2			
UUP	Maureen McKinney	9.32%	476	540.01	613.45	708.46	710.08	1,074.54
UUUP	James Davis	4.13%	282	688.26	704.34	780.9	781.86	807.53
Alliance	Hazel Ervine	5.58%	381	390.62	474.14	584.19	652.89	
Independent	Gerald King	3.03%	207	218.84	240.68			
UUP	Andrew Oliver	0.97%	66	85.61	100.49			
Electorate: 13,881 Valid: 6,823 (49.15%) Spoilt: 199 Quota: 1,138 Turnout: 7,022 (50.59%)

== 1973 Election ==
1973: 3 x UUP, 1 x DUP, 1 x Alliance

Lisburn Area D - 5 seats
Party	Candidate	FPv%	Count									
Party	Candidate	FPv%	1	2	3	4	5	6	7	8	9	10
UUP	Samuel Semple	26.52%	2,294									
UUP	Robert Kirkwood	13.02%	1,126	1,508.58								
Alliance	G. W. C. McCartney	14.36%	1,242	1,282.33	1,285.75	1,325.75	1,325.75	1,333.41	1,353.27	1,506.27		
DUP	Ivan Davis	10.66%	922	955.3	957.52	958.89	993.29	995.09	1,008.06	1,015.49	1,025.49	1,479.49
UUP	William Henry	9.19%	795	974.08	1,000.24	1,005.67	1,009.58	1,083.64	1,324.76	1,337.65	1,341.02	1,432.33
Alliance	George Boyd	6.97%	603	613.73	614.51	632.88	632.88	635.62	641.82	783.9	1,131.27	1,138.7
Vanguard	James Davis	5.61%	485	501.28	502.3	502.3	605.32	609.11	613.46	613.89	614.89	
SDLP	P. J. Rowen	5.03%	435	436.11	436.11	463.11	463.11	463.11	463.11	469.48		
Alliance	Hazel Ervine	3.47%	300	305.55	305.85	319.85	320.22	322.34	328			
UUP	Myrtle McMaster	1.04%	90	220.98	233.82	236.19	240.25	303.93				
UUP	James Hutchinson	1.17%	101	138.37	152.65	156.77	159.51					
Vanguard	Marjorie Lockhart	1.64%	142	150.88	151.3	152.3						
NI Labour	R. N. Hill	1.34%	116	117.48	117.66							
Electorate: 10,564 Valid: 8,651 (81.89%) Spoilt: 72 Quota: 1,442 Turnout: 8,723 (82.57%)
