= Lisburn Town (District Electoral Area) =

District electoral areas in Lisburn, Northern Ireland

Lisburn Town was one of the four district electoral areas in Lisburn, Northern Ireland which existed from 1985 to 1993. The district elected seven members to Lisburn Borough Council, and formed part of the South Antrim constituency for the Northern Ireland Assembly and Lagan Valley for the UK parliament.

It was created for the 1985 local elections, replacing Lisburn Area C and Lisburn Area D which had existed since 1973, and contained the wards of Harmony Hill, Hilden, Lagan Valley, Magheralave, Old Warren, Tonagh and Wallace Park. It was abolished for the 1993 local elections and divided between the Lisburn North DEA and the Lisburn South DEA.

== Councillors ==
Election	Councillor (Party)	Councillor (Party)	Councillor (Party)	Councillor (Party)	Councillor (Party)	Councillor (Party)	Councillor (Party)
1989	Seamus Close (Alliance)	William Belshaw (UUP)	Samuel Semple (UUP)	George Morrison (UUP)	William Gardiner-Watson (UUP)	Ivan Davis (UUP)/ (DUP)	Robin McMaster (DUP)
1985	Seamus Close (Alliance)	William Belshaw (UUP)	Samuel Semple (UUP)	James Davis (UUP)	Maureen McKinney (UUP)	Ivan Davis (UUP)/ (DUP)	Robin Dunsmore (DUP)

== 1989 Election ==
1985: 4 x UUP, 2 x DUP, 1 x Alliance

1989: 5 x UUP, 1 x DUP, 1 x Alliance

1985-1989 Change: UUP gain from DUP

Lisburn Town - 7 seats
Party	Candidate	FPv%	Count						
Party	Candidate	FPv%	1	2	3	4	5	6	7
UUP	Ivan Davis*	36.59%	2,530						
Alliance	Seamus Close*	18.90%	1,307						
UUP	William Belshaw*	15.17%	1,049						
UUP	Samuel Semple*	9.89%	684	1,156.6					
UUP	George Morrison	2.56%	177	585.68	620.54	722.54	769.88	886.56	
UUP	William Gardiner-Watson	2.82%	195	513.24	582.12	670.12	746.44	857.4	880.4
DUP	Robin McMaster	6.10%	422	586.56	596.64	614.64	635.34	667.86	719.54
DUP	James Mulholland	4.19%	290	417.84	428.34	446.34	460.74	497.92	538.18
Workers' Party	Paul McDonald	2.04%	141	160.04	445.22	449.22	450.84	452.78	
UUP	Andrew Park	1.72%	119	261.8	291.62	351.12	366.96		
Electorate: 14,362 Valid: 6,914 (48.14%) Spoilt: 145 Quota: 865 Turnout: 7,059 (49.15%)

== 1985 Election ==
1985: 4 x UUP, 2 x DUP, 1 x Alliance

Lisburn Town - 7 seats
Party	Candidate	FPv%	Count				
Party	Candidate	FPv%	1	2	3	4	5
DUP	Ivan Davis*	38.80%	2,888				
UUP	William Belshaw*	16.27%	1,211				
Alliance	Seamus Close*	13.61%	1,013				
UUP	Maureen McKinney*	11.26%	838	1,107.96			
DUP	Robin Dunsmore*	1.84%	137	946.88			
UUP	Samuel Semple*	7.00%	521	705.96	812.04	909.54	1,012.54
UUP	James Davis*	4.58%	341	570.84	710.76	742.26	844.94
DUP	James Mulholland	2.40%	179	558.44	581.24	614.74	657.28
Alliance	Maura Mulholland	4.23%	315	370.76	379.4	390.9	
Electorate: 14,285 Valid: 7,443 (52.10%) Spoilt: 163 Quota: 931 Turnout: 7,606 (53.24%)
