= Downshire (District Electoral Area) =

District electoral areas in Ards, Northern Ireland

Downshire DEA (1993-2014) within Lisburn

Downshire was one of the district electoral areas in Lisburn, Northern Ireland which existed from 1985 to 2014. It was one of four Lisburn DEAs until 1993, and one of five until 2014. The district elected seven members to Lisburn City Council from 1985 to 1993, and five members from 1993 to 2014, and formed part of Lagan Valley constituencies for the Northern Ireland Assembly and UK Parliament.

It was created for the 1985 local elections, replacing Lisburn Area B and part of Lisburn Area C which had existed since 1973, and contained the wards of Ballymacashbrennan, Blaris, Dromara, Drumbo, Hillhall, Hillsborough and Maze. For the 1993 local elections, it was reduced by two wards as Blaris and Hillhall were transferred to the new Lisburn South DEA. It was abolished for the 2014 local elections and most of the area was transferred to the new Downshire East DEA and Downshire West DEA.

== Councillors ==
Election	Councillor (Party)	Councillor (Party)	Councillor (Party)	Councillor (Party)	Councillor (Party)	Councillor (Party)	Councillor (Party)
2011	Jennifer Coulter (Alliance)	James Baird (UUP)	Paul Stewart (DUP)	Allan Ewart (DUP)	Uel Mackin (DUP)	7 seats 1985–1993	
2005	Elizabeth Campbell (Alliance)	William Ward (UUP)	Basil McCrea (UUP)	Allan Ewart (DUP)	Edwin Poots (DUP)	7 seats 1985–1993	
2001	Elizabeth Campbell (Alliance)	William Ward (UUP)	William Falloon (UUP)	James Baird (UUP)	Edwin Poots (DUP)	7 seats 1985–1993	
1997	Elizabeth Campbell (Alliance)	Kenneth Hull (UUP)	William Falloon (UUP)	William Bleakes (Conservative)/ (UUP)	Edwin Poots (DUP)	7 seats 1985–1993	
1993	Thomas Lilburn (UUP)	William McConnell (UUP)	William Falloon (UUP)	William Bleakes (Conservative)/ (UUP)	Charles Poots (DUP)	7 seats 1985–1993	
1989	Thomas Lilburn (UUP)	Wilfred McClung (UUP)	Thomas Davis (UUP)/ (DUP)	William Bleakes (Conservative)/ (UUP)	Charles Poots (DUP)	Anne Blake (DUP)	Kenneth Hull (Alliance)
1985	Thomas Lilburn (UUP)	Wilfred McClung (UUP)	Thomas Davis (UUP)/ (DUP)	William Bleakes (Conservative)/ (UUP)	Charles Poots (DUP)	Denis McCarroll (DUP)	Richard Reid (Alliance)

== 2011 Election ==
2005: 2 x DUP, 2 x UUP, 1 x Alliance

2011: 3 x DUP, 1 x UUP, 1 x Alliance

2005-2011 Change: DUP gain from UUP

Downshire - 5 seats
Party	Candidate	FPv%	Count						
Party	Candidate	FPv%	1	2	3	4	5	6	7
DUP	Allan Ewart*	20.09%	1,591						
DUP	Paul Stewart	19.64%	1,555						
DUP	Uel Mackin	12.51%	1,070	1,297.46	1,486.91				
Alliance	Jennifer Coulter*	14.13%	1,136	1,142.12	1,147.82	1,156.82	1,173.82	1,194.59	1,393.59
UUP	James Baird	13.28%	1,052	1,065.94	1,081.99	1,143.64	1,143.64	1,248.96	1,266.03
UUP	Alasdair O'Hara	5.62%	445	449.59	453.64	465.49	466.49	520.82	532.12
UUP	Richard Price	5.11%	405	411.12	418.77	440.52	441.52	490.23	499.98
SDLP	Christine Wilson	3.40%	269	269.68	271.78	273.58	348.75	352.2	
TUV	Kaye Kilpatrick	3.65%	289	294.78	297.18	307.68	308.68		
Sinn Féin	Fionnu McCaughley	1.35%	107	107.34	107.49	107.49			
Electorate: 13,764 Valid: 7,919 (57.53%) Spoilt: 114 Quota: 1,320 Turnout: 8,033 (58.36%)

== 2005 Election ==
2001: 3 x UUP, 1 x DUP, 1 x Alliance

2005: 2 x DUP, 2 x UUP, 1 x Alliance

2001-2005 Change: DUP gain from UUP

Downshire - 5 seats
Party	Candidate	FPv%	Count					
Party	Candidate	FPv%	1	2	3	4	5	6
DUP	Edwin Poots*	23.43%	1,929					
UUP	Basil McCrea	19.45%	1,601					
DUP	Allan Ewart	18.25%	1,502					
UUP	William Ward*	7.73%	636	672.54	710.48	888.5	890.34	1,421.13
Alliance	Elizabeth Campbell*	13.20%	1,087	1,097.44	1,123.62	1,221.84	1,222.8	1,325.67
DUP	Joseph Lockhart	7.01%	577	1,008.52	1,017.62	1,040.93	1,153.81	1,247.23
UUP	James Baird*	6.79%	559	603.37	674.91	780.97	783.45	
UUP	William Scott	2.88%	237	257.01	330.79			
Sinn Féin	David Hall	1.26%	104	105.16	105.44			
Electorate: 12,797 Valid: 8,232 (64.33%) Spoilt: 114 Quota: 1,373 Turnout: 8,346 (65.22%)

== 2001 Election ==
1997: 2 x UUP, 1 x DUP, 1 x Alliance, 1 x Conservative

2001: 3 x UUP, 1 x DUP, 1 x Alliance

1997-2001 Change: UUP gain from Conservative

Downshire - 5 seats
Party	Candidate	FPv%	Count				
Party	Candidate	FPv%	1	2	3	4	5
DUP	Edwin Poots*	23.65%	2,006				
UUP	James Baird	17.76%	1,507				
Alliance	Elizabeth Campbell*	14.16%	1,201	1,208.2	1,350.1	1,483.1	
UUP	William Ward	14.06%	1,193	1,273.7	1,315.9	1,460.9	
UUP	William Falloon*	11.87%	1,007	1,055.6	1,100	1,308.5	1,382.48
DUP	Allan Ewart	7.45%	632	1,025.3	1,044	1,159.2	1,168.44
Independent	William Bleakes*	7.18%	609	650.1	691.7		
UUP	Joanne Johnston	2.56%	217	255.4			
Sinn Féin	Cara McCann	1.31%	111	111.3			
Electorate: 12,983 Valid: 8,483 (65.34%) Spoilt: 119 Quota: 1,414 Turnout: 8,602 (66.26%)

== 1997 Election ==
1993: 3 x UUP, 1 x DUP, 1 x Conservative

1997: 2 x UUP, 1 x DUP, 1 x Alliance, 1 x Conservative

1997-2001 Change: Alliance gain from UUP

Downshire - 5 seats
Party	Candidate	FPv%	Count			
Party	Candidate	FPv%	1	2	3	4
UUP	William Falloon*	25.06%	1,328			
DUP	Edwin Poots	19.65%	1,041			
Alliance	Elizabeth Campbell	17.02%	902			
NI Conservatives	William Bleakes*	15.97%	846	784.9		
UUP	Kenneth Hull	6.64%	352	637.6	647.05	945.05
DUP	Jonathan Craig	8.32%	441	457.66	567.16	608.16
UUP	William Moore	7.34%	389	500.18	519.38	
Electorate: 12,872 Valid: 5,299 (41.17%) Spoilt: 81 Quota: 884 Turnout: 5,380 (41.80%)

== 1993 Election ==
1989: 4 x UUP, 2 x DUP, 1 x Alliance

1993: 3 x UUP, 1 x DUP, 1 x Conservative

1989-1993 Change: DUP and Alliance loss due to the reduction of two seats, Conservative leaves UUP

Downshire - 5 seats
Party	Candidate	FPv%	Count				
Party	Candidate	FPv%	1	2	3	4	5
UUP	Thomas Lilburn*	18.38%	1,104				
DUP	Charles Poots*	16.49%	990	1,030			
NI Conservatives	William Bleakes*	15.73%	945	999	1,010.61		
UUP	William Falloon*	13.62%	818	863	907.91	1,042.91	
UUP	William McConnell	9.64%	579	601	632.41	868.02	906.02
Alliance	Kenneth Hull*	13.25%	796	811	813.34	831.7	833.6
DUP	James McCann	8.18%	491	552	557.67		
Ulster Democratic	David Adams	8.18%	283				
Electorate: 12,290 Valid: 6,006 (48.87%) Spoilt: 124 Quota: 1,002 Turnout: 6,130 (49.88%)

== 1989 Election ==
1985: 3 x UUP, 3 x DUP, 1 x Alliance

1989: 4 x UUP, 2 x DUP, 1 x Alliance

1985-1989 Change: UUP gain from DUP

Downshire - 7 seats
Party	Candidate	FPv%	Count						
Party	Candidate	FPv%	1	2	3	4	5	6	7
UUP	William Bleakes*	28.40%	2,297						
UUP	Thomas Lilburn*	13.40%	1,084						
DUP	Charles Poots*	12.88%	1,042						
DUP	Anne Blake	12.34%	998	1,125.11					
UUP	Thomas Davis	8.24%	666	992.61	995.18	1,018.55			
UUP	Wilfred Corfield-McClung*	2.11%	171	634.98	636.98	682.01	705.11	706.88	1,023.51
Alliance	Kenneth Hull	10.78%	872	910.76	951.33	951.9	956.59	956.95	1,000.61
DUP	James McCann	7.10%	574	637.84	641.84	658.37	666.42	689.88	816.42
UUP	John Curry	3.96%	320	572.51	575.51	601.16	633.78	636.39	
Workers' Party	Patrick Pollock	0.78%	63	64.71					
Electorate: 15,814 Valid: 8,087 (51.14%) Spoilt: 175 Quota: 1,011 Turnout: 8,262 (52.24%)

== 1985 Election ==
1985: 3 x UUP, 3 x DUP, 1 x Alliance

Downshire - 7 seats
Party	Candidate	FPv%	Count				
Party	Candidate	FPv%	1	2	3	4	5
UUP	William Bleakes*	27.49%	2,244				
DUP	Charles Poots*	13.34%	1,089				
UUP	Thomas Lilburn*	11.63%	949	1,587.82			
UUP	Wilfred McClung	2.57%	210	325.02	580.7	682.56	1,037.86
Alliance	Richard Reid	11.69%	954	984.24	992.4	992.94	1,026.94
DUP	Thomas Davis	9.63%	786	925.32	949.32	963.78	1,025.06
DUP	Denis McCarroll*	10.49%	856	960.76	990.52	1,006.06	1,023.06
DUP	James McCann*	8.15%	665	725.48	746.12	772.64	772.64
UUP	William Gardiner-Watson*	5.02%	410	525.02	647.42	652.28	
Electorate: 14,092 Valid: 8,163 (57.93%) Spoilt: 141 Quota: 1,021 Turnout: 8,304 (58.93%)
