= 1985 Lisburn Borough Council election =

Local government election in Northern Ireland

← 1981	15 May 1985	1989 →

All 28 seats to Lisburn Borough Council 15 seats needed for a majority
	First party	Second party	Third party
Party	UUP	DUP	Alliance
Seats won	13	8	3
Seat change	▲5	▼2	▲1
	Fourth party	Fifth party	Sixth party
Party	SDLP	Sinn Féin	UUUP
Seats won	2	2	0
Seat change	0	▲2	▼1

Elections to Lisburn Borough Council were held on 15 May 1985 on the same day as the other Northern Irish local government elections. The election used four district electoral areas to elect a total of 28 councillors.

== Election results ==
Lisburn Borough Council Election Result 1985
Party	Seats	Gains	Losses	Net gain/loss	Seats %	Votes %	Votes	+/−
UUP	13	2	0	▲5	46.4	42.8	14,101	▲10.6
DUP	8	0	2	▼2	28.6	32.1	10,568	▼10.6
Alliance	3	1	0	▲1	10.1	11.0	3,624	▼1.2
SDLP	2	0	0	0	7.1	6.6	2,163	▲0.7
Sinn Féin	2	0	0	▲2	7.1	5.7	1,873	New
Workers' Party	0	0	0	0	0.0	1.8	584	▲0.4

Note: "Votes" are the first preference votes.

== Districts summary ==
Results of the Lisburn Borough Council election, 1985 by district
Ward	%	Cllrs	%	Cllrs	%	Cllrs	%	Cllrs	%	Cllrs	%	Cllrs	Total Cllrs
Ward	UUP		DUP		Alliance		SDLP		Sinn Féin		Others		Total Cllrs
Downshire	46.7	3	41.6	3	11.7	1	0.0	0	0.0	0	0.0	0	7
Dunmurry Cross	30.8	2	18.1	1	7.8	1	13.3	1	22.8	2	7.2	0	7
Killultagh	53.2	4	27.3	2	7.7	0	11.8	1	0.0	0	0.0	0	7
Lisburn Town	39.1	4	43.0	2	17.9	1	0.0	0	0.0	0	0.0	0	7
Total	42.8	13	32.1	8	11.0	3	6.6	2	5.7	2	1.8	0	28

== District results ==
=== Downshire ===
1985: 3 x UUP, 3 x DUP, 1 x Alliance

Downshire - 7 seats
Party	Candidate	FPv%	Count				
Party	Candidate	FPv%	1	2	3	4	5
UUP	William Bleakes*	27.49%	2,244				
DUP	Charles Poots*	13.34%	1,089				
UUP	Thomas Lilburn*	11.63%	949	1,587.82			
UUP	Wilfred McClung	2.57%	210	325.02	580.7	682.56	1,037.86
Alliance	Richard Reid	11.69%	954	984.24	992.4	992.94	1,026.94
DUP	Thomas Davis	9.63%	786	925.32	949.32	963.78	1,025.06
DUP	Denis McCarroll*	10.49%	856	960.76	990.52	1,006.06	1,023.06
DUP	James McCann*	8.15%	665	725.48	746.12	772.64	772.64
UUP	William Gardiner-Watson*	5.02%	410	525.02	647.42	652.28	
Electorate: 14,092 Valid: 8,163 (57.93%) Spoilt: 141 Quota: 1,021 Turnout: 8,304 (58.93%)

=== Dunmurry Cross ===
1985: 2 x Sinn Féin, 2 x UUP, 1 x SDLP, 1 x DUP, 1 x Alliance

Dunmurry Cross - 7 seats
Party	Candidate	FPv%	Count					
Party	Candidate	FPv%	1	2	3	4	5	6
UUP	William McAllister*	22.98%	1,886					
DUP	William Beattie*	16.49%	1,353					
SDLP	William McDonnell*	13.32%	1,093					
Sinn Féin	Damien Gibney	12.78%	1,049					
UUP	Richard Scott	3.64%	299	904.82	962.66	1,033.66		
Alliance	Donald Cheyne	7.77%	638	657.32	664.76	672.8	704.54	1,002.26
Sinn Féin	Patrick Rice	10.04%	824	825.84	826.08	827.08	835.96	908.5
UUP	Norman Tulip	4.22%	346	514.82	536.18	791.06	791.12	802.8
Workers' Party	John Lowry	7.12%	584	590.44	591.64	594.36	611.76	
DUP	Ronald Kelly	1.64%	135	188.82	420.42			
Electorate: 14,907 Valid: 8,207 (55.05%) Spoilt: 216 Quota: 1,026 Turnout: 8,423 (56.50%)

=== Killultagh ===
1985: 4 x UUP, 2 x DUP, 1 x SDLP

Killultagh - 7 seats
Party	Candidate	FPv%	Count				
Party	Candidate	FPv%	1	2	3	4	5
UUP	Ronald Campbell*	26.22%	2,386				
DUP	Cecil Calvert	14.63%	1,331				
UUP	William Lewis	12.78%	1,163				
UUP	Jim Dillon*	10.96%	997	1,968.49			
UUP	Henry McGiffin	3.30%	300	447.34	1,124.84		
DUP	Robert McNeice*	6.13%	558	613.12	685.12	808.87	1,338.87
SDLP	Paddy Ritchie	11.76%	1,070	1,073.71	1,074.71	1,074.71	1,079.29
Alliance	Eileen Drayne	7.74%	704	731.03	765.03	768.78	805.72
DUP	Henry Stevenson	6.49%	591	625.45	664.95	707.1	
Electorate: 15,793 Valid: 9,100 (57.62%) Spoilt: 133 Quota: 1,138 Turnout: 9,233 (58.46%)

=== Lisburn Town ===
1985: 4 x UUP, 2 x DUP, 1 x Alliance

Lisburn Town - 7 seats
Party	Candidate	FPv%	Count				
Party	Candidate	FPv%	1	2	3	4	5
DUP	Ivan Davis*	38.80%	2,888				
UUP	William Belshaw*	16.27%	1,211				
Alliance	Seamus Close*	13.61%	1,013				
UUP	Maureen McKinney*	11.26%	838	1,107.96			
DUP	Robin Dunsmore*	1.84%	137	946.88			
UUP	Samuel Semple*	7.00%	521	705.96	812.04	909.54	1,012.54
UUP	James Davis*	4.58%	341	570.84	710.76	742.26	844.94
DUP	James Mulholland	2.40%	179	558.44	581.24	614.74	657.28
Alliance	Maura Mulholland	4.23%	315	370.76	379.4	390.9	
Electorate: 14,285 Valid: 7,443 (52.10%) Spoilt: 163 Quota: 931 Turnout: 7,606 (53.24%)
