= Peter O'Hagan =

Politician from Northern Ireland

Mayor of Lisburn
- In office 1998–2000

Member of Lisburn City Council
- In office 17 May 1989 – 5 May 2005
- Preceded by: Paddy Ritchie
- Succeeded by: Pat Catney
- Constituency: Killultagh

Personal details
- Born: 18 May 1931 Liverpool, England
- Died: 23 December 2009 (aged 78)
- Party: Social Democratic and Labour

Peter O'Hagan was an Irish Nationalist politician who sat as a Social Democratic and Labour Party (SDLP) Councillor on Lisburn City Council. He was one of three SDLP members of the predominantly Unionist council.

== Background ==
O'Hagan represented the electoral ward of Killultagh, County Antrim. In 1998, O'Hagan became the first nationalist Mayor of Lisburn. In 1996, he was an unsuccessful candidate in the Northern Ireland Forum election in Lagan Valley.

O'Hagan died on 23 December 2009.

Civic offices
Preceded by George Morrison	Mayor of Lisburn; 1998–2000	Succeeded by Jim Dillon
