= Edwin Poots =

Speaker of the Northern Ireland Assembly since 2024

Edwin Poots MLA
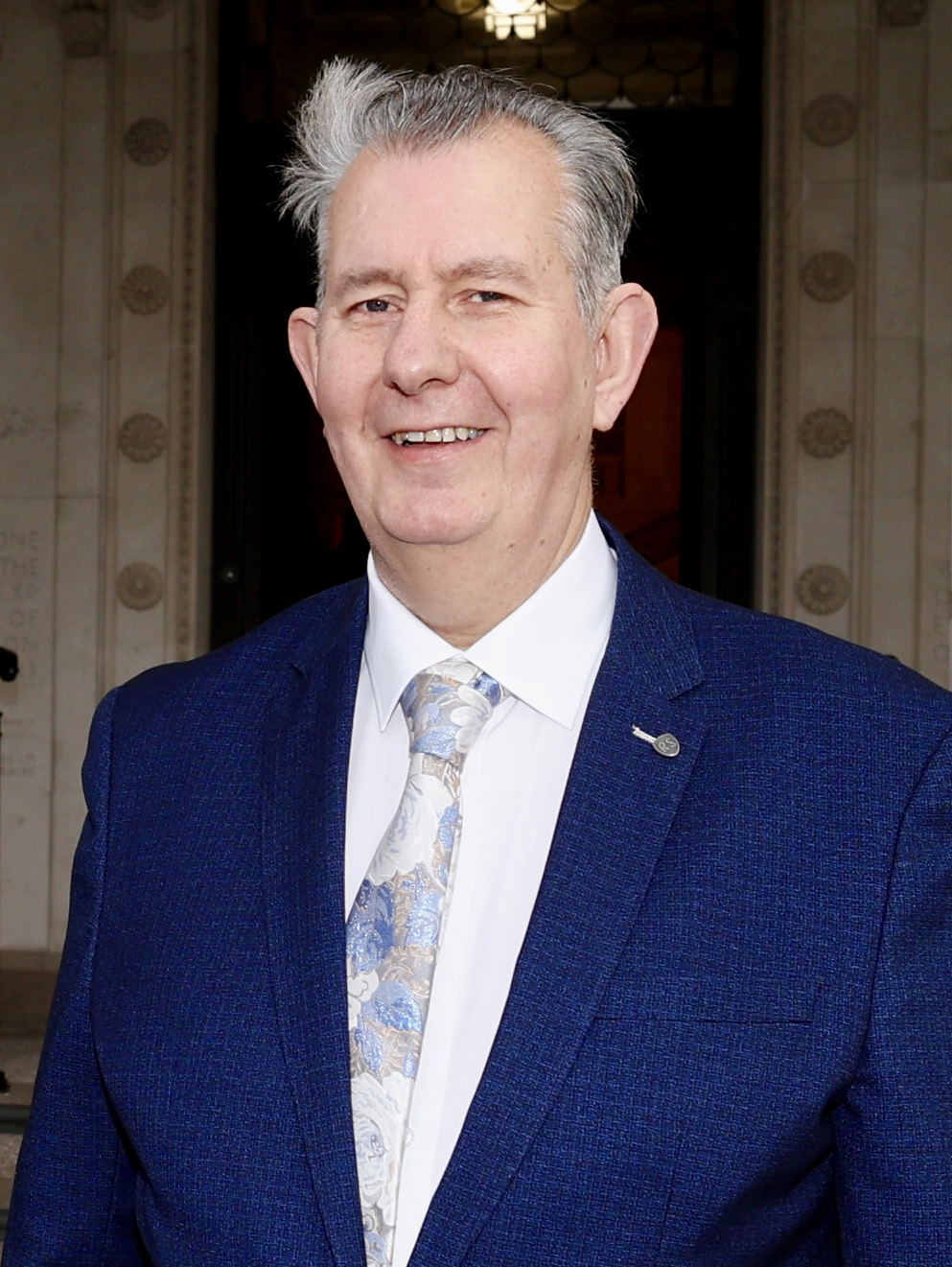
- Poots in 2024

Speaker of the Northern Ireland Assembly
- Incumbent
- Assumed office 3 February 2024
- Deputy: Carál Ní Chuilín; John Blair; Steve Aiken
- Preceded by: Alex Maskey

Leader of the Democratic Unionist Party
- In office 28 May 2021 – 30 June 2021^{[b]}
- Deputy: Paula Bradley
- Preceded by: Arlene Foster
- Succeeded by: Jeffrey Donaldson
Ministerial offices 2007‍–‍2022
Minister of Agriculture, Environment, and Rural Affairs
In office 11 January 2020^{[a]} – 27 October 2022
| First Minister | Arlene Foster; Paul Givan |
| Preceded by | Michelle McIlveen |
| Succeeded by | Andrew Muir (2024) |
Minister of Health, Social Services and Public Safety
In office 16 May 2011 – 23 September 2014
| First Minister | Peter Robinson |
| Preceded by | Michael McGimpsey |
| Succeeded by | Jim Wells |
Minister of the Environment
In office 3 July 2009 – 4 May 2011
| First Minister | Peter Robinson |
| Preceded by | Sammy Wilson |
| Succeeded by | Alex Attwood |
Minister of Culture, Arts and Leisure
In office 14 May 2007 – 9 June 2008
| First Minister | Ian Paisley; Peter Robinson |
| Preceded by | Michael McGimpsey |
| Succeeded by | Gregory Campbell |

Member of the Legislative Assembly for Lagan Valley
- In office 25 June 1998 – 6 March 2022
- Preceded by: Constituency created
- Succeeded by: Paul Rankin

Member of the Legislative Assembly for Belfast South
- Incumbent
- Assumed office 7 March 2022
- Preceded by: Christopher Stalford

Member of Lisburn City Council
- In office 21 May 1997 – 5 May 2011
- Preceded by: Charles Poots
- Succeeded by: Uel Mackin
- Constituency: Downshire

Northern Ireland Forum Member for Lagan Valley
- In office 30 May 1996 – 25 April 1998
- Preceded by: New forum
- Succeeded by: Forum dissolved

Personal details
- Born: 27 May 1965 (age 61) Lisburn, Northern Ireland
- Party: Speaker (since 2024)
- Other political affiliations: Democratic Unionist Party (before 2024)
- Spouse: Glynis Poots
- Children: 4
- Education: College of Agriculture
- Occupation: Farmer
- Website: Edwin Poots MLA
- ^aGordon Lyons served as Acting Agriculture Minister from 2 February 2021 to 8 March 2021 while Poots temporarily stood aside for health reasons.^bPoots announced that he had requested a new leadership contest on 17 June 2021, but remained in office until a successor was elected.

Edwin Poots (born 27 May 1965) is a British politician from Northern Ireland, serving as Speaker of the Northern Ireland Assembly since February 2024. He served as leader of the Democratic Unionist Party (DUP) from May to June 2021. He was first elected as a Member of the Legislative Assembly (MLA) in 1998.

In 2007, First Minister Ian Paisley appointed Poots to the Northern Ireland Executive as Minister of Culture, Arts and Leisure. Poots left office after Peter Robinson became First Minister in 2008. In 2009, Poots returned to the Executive as Minister of the Environment, before being promoted to Minister of Health, Social Services and Public Safety in 2011. He was removed as Health Minister in 2014. In January 2020, he was reappointed to the Executive by First Minister Arlene Foster as Minister of Agriculture, Environment, and Rural Affairs, a position that he held until October 2022.

After Foster resigned as DUP leader in 2021, Poots was elected as her successor, defeating Sir Jeffrey Donaldson. However, less than three weeks later, on 17 June, following controversy over his decision to nominate Paul Givan to be First Minister, Poots announced that he had requested a new leadership contest and that he would remain in post until a successor was appointed. Donaldson succeeded Poots on 30 June 2021.

Following the death of his friend Christopher Stalford, it was announced on 7 March 2022 that Poots would be co-opted to fill the Belfast South Assembly seat, and run in the 2022 Assembly election, leaving a vacancy in Lagan Valley.

== Early life ==
Poots was educated at the Wallace High School, Lisburn, and then studied at Greenmount Agricultural College. He is a farmer and is married with four children.

His father, Charles Poots, was also a DUP politician, having stood in the 1969 Northern Ireland general election for the Protestant Unionist Party.

One of Edwin Poots's sons, Luke Poots, was a councillor with Lisburn and Castlereagh City Council, but he did not seek reelection in the 2019 Lisburn and Castlereagh City Council election.

== Career ==
=== Local and regional politics ===
Poots served as a local government councillor on Lisburn City Council before being elected to the Northern Ireland Assembly in the 1998 election.

During 2003 to 2024, Poots served on multiple Assembly committees.

On 8 May 2007, he was appointed Minister of Culture, Arts and Leisure in the Northern Ireland Executive, a post he held until 9 June 2008, when a cabinet re-shuffle saw this post being reassigned to Gregory Campbell. He was subsequently made Deputy Mayor of Lisburn on 23 June 2008.

On 1 July 2009, Poots was returned to the Executive as Minister of the Environment, in charge of the Department of the Environment. In May 2011, he was appointed as Minister of Health, Social Services and Public Safety.

In June 2011, Poots fired his legal shotgun twice from his upstairs window as a warning to intruders on his property in Lisburn, who then fled. His family called the police and an investigation began. A DUP spokesman said "Given the risk to Mr Poots and his family, a legally held shotgun was safely discharged into the air by Mr Poots from within his house to alert the intruders that their presence was known."

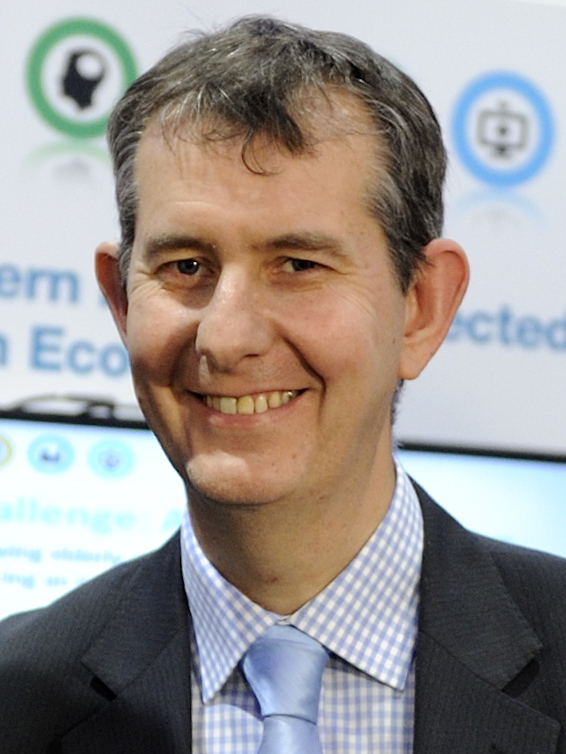
Poots in 2013

On 23 September 2014, Poots was replaced by Jim Wells as Minister of Health, Social Services and Public Safety.

When devolution was restored on 11 January 2020, First Minister Arlene Foster appointed Poots as Minister of Agriculture, Environment, and Rural Affairs. Gordon Lyons served as the acting Agriculture Minister from 2 February to 8 March 2021 after Poots stood down temporarily for health reasons.

=== DUP leadership ===
On 29 April 2021, Poots announced his candidacy in the party leadership election in May to succeed Arlene Foster as DUP leader, the day after Foster declared she would be resigning.

Poots was announced as leader of the DUP on 14 May 2021, beating Sir Jeffrey Donaldson by 19 votes to 17. He was ratified as the party's leader on 28 May. Some DUP members spoke of their "disgust" at the way in which Foster had been ousted. There were claims that Poots' supporters engaged in bullying and intimidation during the leadership election, and some party members walked out before his speech. Poots admitted party members are "bruised" but denied claims of intimidation. Several party members resigned, including councillors.

The First Minister had always been the leader of the largest party, but Poots said he did not want to be First Minister if he became DUP leader. On 8 June, Poots unveiled his ministerial team, which included Paul Givan as First Minister.

On 17 June 2021, a letter from the DUP party chairman and other senior party members asked Poots to delay Givan's nomination as First Minister to oppose the British government's decision to introduce Irish language legislation in the Westminster Parliament. However, Poots nominated Givan as First Minister and Sinn Féin re-nominated Michelle O'Neill as deputy First Minister, restoring the Northern Ireland Executive. Prior to this nomination DUP MLAs had voted 24 to four against the decision to nominate Givan for the role.

Within hours of Givan being sworn in as First Minister, DUP officials convened a party meeting to oust Poots as the leader of the party. Poots was forced to resign only 21 days into his tenure as DUP leader, announcing that he had requested a new leadership contest but that he would stay in post until a successor was elected. Sir Jeffrey Donaldson succeeded Poots in the role on 30 June 2021.

=== Assembly politics ===
In January 2022, Poots unsuccessfully sought to switch constituencies for Northern Ireland Assembly elections.

=== Northern Ireland Protocol ===
On 6 June 2021, Poots announced he would legally challenge the Northern Ireland Protocol and insisted he would not build any permanent infrastructure to help implement it, stating that he would also be "commencing the process to remove what has already been imposed using the courts and politics to make the case. Every unionist is not just opposed to the economic burdens but reject the implications for our sovereignty as part of the UK".

On 21 December 2021, Loyalist activist Jamie Bryson (on behalf of the Unionist Voice Policy Studies think tank) served a pre-action letter on Poots, stating an intention to commence judicial review proceedings if he did not declare an intent to refer decisions on the checks and inspections to his Executive colleagues for approval. Under Stormont rules, issues deemed 'significant and controversial' should be dealt with by Northern Ireland's power sharing executive as a whole. Issues that cut across the responsibilities of multiple departments should also be brought to the Executive under the terms of the ministerial code. In Bryson's view, Poots would therefore have had to seek Executive approval pursuant to section 28A (5) of the NI Act 1998 in relation to the continuing, and any future, implementation of the Protocol. On 25 January 2022, Poots confirmed his intention to ask the Executive for retrospective approval for carrying out checks from the date the protocol came into effect in January 2021 and ongoing permission to continue doing them.

As the minister responsible for the Department of Agriculture, Environment and Rural Affairs (DAERA), having "issued a similar instruction [in 2021]", Poots unilaterally "ordered all Brexit checks on food and farm products to be stopped" from midnight on 2 February 2022. Several commentators, including the Minister of Justice, questioned the legality of Poots' instruction and whether DAERA officials could lawfully comply.

On 15 December 2022, the High Court of Northern Ireland declared that the Poots decision to halt Irish Sea border checks were unlawful and "politically motivated". Formally quashing Poots's order to DAERA staff, Mr Justice Colton stated: "By issuing the instruction on February 2, 2022 the Minister was in breach of his legal obligations. The instruction was unlawful and of no effect". The judge also said that it was "difficult to draw conclusion other than the decision under challenge was an overtly political one, taken for political reasons, and as part of a political campaign directed in opposition to the Protocol".

In January 2023, the UK government passed legislation to allow the Secretary of State for Northern Ireland to direct the construction and manning of permanent border posts in Northern Ireland. DUP member of parliament Sammy Wilson stated he believed the legislation was published over the heads of the Northern Ireland Assembly to ensure that there was compliance with the NI Protocol and so that "unionists are unable to thwart such compliance".

== Views ==
Poots is a young earth creationist, rejecting the Big Bang theory and theory of evolution. In an interview with BBC presenter William Crawley, when asked how old the Earth was, Poots replied: "My view on the earth is that it's a young earth. My view is 4,000 BC". Young earth creationism is accepted by the Free Presbyterian Church of Ulster, of which Poots is a member, and other conservative evangelicals in Northern Ireland. In a 2012 Belfast Telegraph article, which discussed lobbying by the creationist bible group the Caleb Foundation, Poots stated that, while not a member of the group, "Some of my views coincide with the Caleb Foundation".

Poots faced criticism for banning blood donations from gay people, saying: "I think that people who engage in high-risk sexual behaviour in general should be excluded from giving blood". In June 2012, Poots said he wanted to extend the ban to people who have sex "with somebody in Africa or sex with prostitutes", stating that, in his view, this was also high-risk sexual behaviour.

In September 2013, as Health Minister for Northern Ireland, he fought the ruling that would bring laws around LGBT adoption in Northern Ireland into line with other parts of the United Kingdom.

In January 2016, Poots was criticised by gender equality advocates, political commentators and other politicians for saying that the newly elected First Minister, Arlene Foster's, most important job was as a "wife, mother and daughter". Poots defended himself saying his statement was "not sexist" and that he considered his most important job to be that of a "husband, father and son".

In October 2020, he was criticised by members of Sinn Féin and the Alliance Party after saying coronavirus was more common in nationalist areas. He stated: "There is a difference between nationalist areas and unionist areas – and the difference is around six to one". The Department of Health stated that "data on Covid infections is not collected according to religious or political affiliation".

== Personal life ==
In December 2020, it was reported that while recovering from surgery, Poots had tested positive for COVID-19, the first Executive minister to do so. In January 2021 he revealed to BBC television presenter Stephen Nolan that he had cancer, and on 2 February 2021 he temporarily stood down for health reasons, returning to work several weeks later.

Northern Ireland Forum
| New forum | Member for Lagan Valley; 1996–1998 | Forum dissolved |
Northern Ireland Assembly
| New assembly | MLA for Lagan Valley; 1998–present | Incumbent |
Political offices
| Vacant Title last held by Michael McGimpsey | Minister of Culture, Arts and Leisure; 2007–2008 | Succeeded by Gregory Campbell |
| Preceded by Sammy Wilson | Minister of the Environment; 2009–2011 | Succeeded by Alex Attwood |
| Preceded by Michael McGimpsey | Minister of Health, Social Services and Public Safety; 2011–2014 | Succeeded by Jim Wells |
| Preceded by Michelle McIlveen | Minister of Agriculture, Environment, and Rural Affairs; 2020–2022 | Vacant |
Party political offices
| Preceded by Arlene Foster | Leader of the Democratic Unionist Party; 2021 | Succeeded by Jeffrey Donaldson |
