= Lagan Valley (Assembly constituency) =

Constituency of the Northern Ireland Assembly

Coordinates: 54.506°N 6.044°W

- Northern Ireland Assembly; Parliamentary constituency
- Boundary of Lagan Valley in Northern Ireland

Current constituency
- Created: 1996
- Seats: 6 (1996–2016); 5 (2017–)
- MLAs: Robbie Butler (UUP); Paul Givan (DUP); Michelle Guy (APNI); David Honeyford (APNI); Emma Little-Pengelly (DUP)
- Districts: Lisburn and Castlereagh

Lagan Valley is a constituency in the Northern Ireland Assembly.

The seat was first used for a Northern Ireland-only election for the Northern Ireland Forum in 1996. Since 1998, it has elected members to the current Assembly.

For Assembly elections prior to 1996, the constituency was largely part of the South Antrim and North Down constituencies. Since 1997, it has shared boundaries with the Lagan Valley UK Parliament constituency.

== Members ==
Election	MLA (Party)	MLA (Party)	MLA (Party)	MLA (Party)	MLA (Party)	MLA (Party)
1996	5 seats 1996–1998	David Campbell (UUP)	Ivan Davis (UUP)	Jeffrey Donaldson (UUP)	Edwin Poots (DUP)	Cecil Calvert (DUP)
1998	Seamus Close (Alliance Party)	Billy Bell (UUP)	Ivan Davis (UUP)	Patrick Roche (UKUP)	Edwin Poots (DUP)	Patricia Lewsley (SDLP)
2003	Seamus Close (Alliance Party)	Billy Bell (UUP)	Norah Beare (UUP / DUP)	Jeffrey Donaldson (UUP / DUP)	Edwin Poots (DUP)	Patricia Lewsley (SDLP)
January 2007 co-option	Seamus Close (Alliance Party)	Billy Bell (UUP)	Norah Beare (UUP / DUP)	Jeffrey Donaldson (UUP / DUP)	Edwin Poots (DUP)	Marietta Farrell (SDLP)
2007	Trevor Lunn (Alliance Party/ Independent)	Basil McCrea (UUP/NI21)	Jonathan Craig (DUP)	Jeffrey Donaldson (UUP / DUP)	Edwin Poots (DUP)	Paul Butler (Sinn Féin)
June 2010 co-option	Trevor Lunn (Alliance Party/ Independent)	Basil McCrea (UUP/NI21)	Jonathan Craig (DUP)	Paul Givan (DUP)	Edwin Poots (DUP)	Paul Butler (Sinn Féin)
2011	Trevor Lunn (Alliance Party/ Independent)	Basil McCrea (UUP/NI21)	Jonathan Craig (DUP)	Paul Givan (DUP)	Edwin Poots (DUP)	Brenda Hale (DUP)
June 2013 defection	Trevor Lunn (Alliance Party/ Independent)	Basil McCrea (UUP/NI21)	Jonathan Craig (DUP)	Paul Givan (DUP)	Edwin Poots (DUP)	Brenda Hale (DUP)
2016	Trevor Lunn (Alliance Party/ Independent)	Robbie Butler (UUP)	Jennifer Palmer (UUP)	Paul Givan (DUP)	Edwin Poots (DUP)	Brenda Hale (DUP)
2017	Trevor Lunn (Alliance Party/ Independent)	Robbie Butler (UUP)	Seat abolished (5 seats 2017–present)	Paul Givan (DUP)	Edwin Poots (DUP)	Pat Catney (SDLP)
March 2020 defection	Trevor Lunn (Alliance Party/ Independent)	Robbie Butler (UUP)	Seat abolished (5 seats 2017–present)	Paul Givan (DUP)	Edwin Poots (DUP)	Pat Catney (SDLP)
March 2022 co-option	Trevor Lunn (Alliance Party/ Independent)	Robbie Butler (UUP)	Seat abolished (5 seats 2017–present)	Paul Givan (DUP)	Paul Rankin (DUP)	Pat Catney (SDLP)
2022	Sorcha Eastwood (Alliance Party)	Robbie Butler (UUP)	Seat abolished (5 seats 2017–present)	Paul Givan (DUP)	Jeffrey Donaldson (DUP)	David Honeyford (Alliance Party)
May 2022 co-option	Sorcha Eastwood (Alliance Party)	Robbie Butler (UUP)	Seat abolished (5 seats 2017–present)	Paul Givan (DUP)	Emma Little-Pengelly (DUP)	David Honeyford (Alliance Party)
July 2024 co-option	Michelle Guy (Alliance Party)	Robbie Butler (UUP)	Seat abolished (5 seats 2017–present)	Paul Givan (DUP)	Emma Little-Pengelly (DUP)	David Honeyford (Alliance Party)

Note: The columns in this table are used only for presentational purposes, and no significance should be attached to the order of columns. For details of the order in which seats were won at each election, see the detailed results of that election.

== Elections ==
=== Northern Ireland Assembly ===
==== 2027 ====
2027 Assembly election: Lagan Valley – 5 seats
Party	Candidate	FPv%	Count
Party	Candidate	FPv%	1
Alliance	Michelle Guy		
SDLP	Rebecca Harper		
Alliance	David Honeyford		
Sinn Féin	Declan Lynch		

==== 2022 ====
2022 Assembly election: Lagan Valley – 5 seats
Party	Candidate	FPv%	Count						
Party	Candidate	FPv%	1	2	3	4	5	6	7
DUP	**Jeffrey Donaldson**	24.74%	**12,626**						
UUP	**Robbie Butler**	16.15%	8,242	**8,632**					
Alliance	**Sorcha Eastwood**	16.09%	8,211	8,247	8,327	**8,654**			
DUP	**Paul Givan**	9.92%	5,062	8,377	8,385	**8,569**			
Alliance	**David Honeyford**	8.20%	4,183	4,199	4,215	4,408	4,991	5,605	**6,340**
SDLP	Pat Catney	6.34%	3,235	3,243	3,286	3,426	3,566	5,400	5,696
TUV	Lorna Smyth	6.83%	3,488	3,659	3,665	3,865	4,563	4,576	
Sinn Féin	Gary McCleave	5.34%	2,725	2,727	2,750	2,798	2,806		
UUP	Laura Turner	3.15%	1,607	1,659	1,663	1,863			
Ind. Unionist	Gary Hynds	1.44%	735	757	769				
Green (NI)	Simon Lee	1.27%	648	652	720				
People Before Profit	Amanda Doherty	0.53%	271	272					
Electorate: 81,562 Valid: 51,033 (62.57%) Spoilt: 510 Quota: 8,506 Turnout: 51,543 (63.19%)

==== 2017 ====
2017 Assembly election: Lagan Valley – 5 seats
Party	Candidate	FPv%	Count							
Party	Candidate	FPv%	1	2	3	4	5	6	7	8
DUP	**Paul Givan**	17.83%	**8,035**							
UUP	**Robbie Butler**	15.19%	6,846	6,880	6,909.58	7,030.64	7,130.7	7,462.42	**11,037.42**	
Alliance	**Trevor Lunn**	13.55%	6,105	6,131	6,135.74	6,340.80	7,018.86	7,392.86	**7,656.86**	
DUP	**Edwin Poots**	13.34%	6,013	6,028	6,146.92	6,167.04	6,185.04	6,472.48	6,820.82	**7,401.82**
SDLP	**Pat Catney**	8.42%	3,795	3,800	3,801.32	3,859.38	4,021.38	5,383.50	5,692.92	**6,848.92**
DUP	Brenda Hale	10.13%	4,566	4,584	4,890.9	4,908.02	4,927.14	5,260.84	5,561.7	6,415.7
UUP	Jenny Palmer	9.97%	4,492	4,542	4,553.46	4,672.58	4,736.7	5,094.72		
Sinn Féin	Peter Doran	4.00%	1,801	1,803	1,803.06	1,829.12	1,877.12			
TUV	Samuel Morrison	3.08%	1,389	1,406	1,411.88	1,434	1,448			
Green (NI)	Dan Barrios-O'Neill	2.02%	912	933	933.36	1,217.36				
Independent	Jonny Orr	1.90%	856	909	909.72					
NI Conservatives	Matthew Robinson	0.41%	183							
Independent	Keith Gray	0.17%	76							
Electorate: 72,621 Valid: 45,069 (62.06%) Spoilt: 371 Quota: 7,512 Turnout: 45,440 (62.57%)

==== 2016 ====
2016 Assembly election: Lagan Valley – 6 seats
Party	Candidate	FPv%	Count							
Party	Candidate	FPv%	1	2	3	4	5	6	7	8
DUP	**Paul Givan**	13.81%	5,364	5,383	5,467	5,480	5,484	**5,635**		
Alliance	**Trevor Lunn**	9.54%	3,707	3,851	3,900	4,051	4,183	4,994	**6,886**	
UUP	**Robbie Butler**	11.26%	4,376	4,450	4,549	4,614	4,618	5,004	5,167	**5,291**
UUP	**Jenny Palmer**	9.96%	3,871	3,956	4,048	4,214	4,216	4,737	4,971	**5,212**
DUP	**Edwin Poots**	11.94%	4,638	4,662	4,713	4,729	4,729	4,986	5,039	**5,064**
DUP	**Brenda Hale**	10.90%	4,236	4,283	4,316	4,326	4,330	4,518	4,556	**4,577**
DUP	Jonathan Craig	10.52%	4,087	4,103	4,159	4,169	4,173	4,309	4,387	4,409
SDLP	Pat Catney	7.46%	2,899	2,935	2,954	2,993	3,704	4,012		
Green (NI)	Dan Barrios-O'Neill	2.88%	1,118	1,205	1,245	1,547	1,661			
TUV	Lyle Rea	3.32%	1,291	1,303	1,506	1,516	1,518			
Sinn Féin	Jacqui McGeough	2.69%	1,045	1,054	1,061	1,082				
Independent	Jonny Orr	2.10%	817	840	857					
UKIP	Brian Higginson	1.98%	768	792						
NI Conservatives	Jack Irwin	0.88%	341							
NI Labour	Peter Dynes	0.44%	171							
Democracy First	Frazer McCammond	0.32%	124							
Electorate: 73,746 Valid: 38,853 (52.86%) Spoilt: 374 Quota: 5,551 Turnout: 39,227 (53.19%)

==== 2011 ====
2011 Assembly election: Lagan Valley – 6 seats
Party	Candidate	FPv%	Count						
Party	Candidate	FPv%	1	2	3	4	5	6	7
DUP	**Edwin Poots**	20.65%	**7,329**						
UUP	**Basil McCrea**	16.26%	**5,771**						
DUP	**Jonathan Craig**	12.01%	4,263	4,887.65	4,931.09	4,949.95	**5,080.95**		
Alliance	**Trevor Lunn**	12.37%	4,389	4,471.46	4,550.42	4,877.17	4,947.45	**5,120**	
DUP	**Paul Givan**	12.26%	4,352	4,821.96	4,858.32	4,872.23	4,978.08	4,991.7	**5,517.7**
DUP	**Brenda Hale**	8.20%	2,910	3,816.44	3,856.04	3,874.33	4,055.82	4,067.13	**4,791.23**
SDLP	Pat Catney	6.10%	2,165	2,176.47	2,185.95	2,286.53	2,295.25	3,195.21	3,405.92
UUP	Mark Hill	4.18%	1,482	1,562.6	1,985.12	2,014.35	2,425.62	2,433.86	
Sinn Féin	Mary Kate Quinn	3.39%	1,203	1,207.03	1,208.59	1,237.21	1,241.21		
TUV	Lyle Rea	2.91%	1,031	1,066.65	1,095.57	1,110.24			
Green (NI)	Conor Quinn	1.67%	592	599.44	605.8				
Electorate: 67,532 Valid: 35,487 (52.55%) Spoilt: 355 Quota: 5,070 Turnout: 35,842 (53.07%)

==== 2007 ====
2007 Assembly election: Lagan Valley – 6 seats
Party	Candidate	FPv%	Count								
Party	Candidate	FPv%	1	2	3	4	5	6	7	8	9
DUP	**Jeffrey Donaldson**	23.42%	**9,793**								
Sinn Féin	**Paul Butler**	12.19%	5,098	5,101.9	5,113.9	5,116.29	5,174.07	**6,387.07**			
UUP	**Basil McCrea**	9.64%	4,031	4,228.73	4,290.63	4,441.38	4,846.54	4,937.32	**6,712.32**		
Alliance	**Trevor Lunn**	9.00%	3,765	3,832.08	3,961.47	4,027.81	4,582.07	5,959.75	**6,263.75**		
DUP	**Jonathan Craig**	8.30%	3,471	4,894.5	4,921.79	5,081.56	5,182.27	5,200.78	5,783.71	**6,147.9**	
DUP	**Edwin Poots**	8.27%	3,457	4,460.08	4,491.76	4,667.4	4,768.22	4,786.73	5,068.48	5,323.65	**5,385.65**
DUP	Paul Givan	8.07%	3,377	4,079	4,108.07	4,231.82	4,310.25	4,327.59	4,566.13	4,681.47	4,728.47
UUP	Billy Bell	6.21%	2,599	2,749.54	2,787.1	2,880.24	3,653.93	3,739.93			
SDLP	Marietta Farrell	6.79%	2,839	2,854.6	2,886.38	2,898.38	3,062.16				
UUP	Ronnie Crawford	2.74%	1,147	1,250.35	1,275.69	1,336.37					
Green (NI)	Michael Rogan	2.20%	922	938.77	989.11	1,023.45					
UK Unionist	Robert McCartney	2.04%	853	948.55	987.84						
NI Conservatives	Neil Johnston	0.93%	387	418.98							
Workers' Party	John Magee	0.20%	83	84.95							
Electorate: 70,101 Valid: 41,822 (59.66%) Spoilt: 236 Quota: 5,975 Turnout: 42,058 (60.00%)

==== 2003 ====
2003 Assembly election: Lagan Valley – 6 seats
Party	Candidate	FPv%	Count									
Party	Candidate	FPv%	1	2	3	4	5	6	7	8	9	10
UUP	**Jeffrey Donaldson**	34.19%	**14,104**									
DUP	**Edwin Poots**	12.54%	5,175	**6,714.32**								
UUP	**Billy Bell**	6.74%	2,782	4,739.5	4,856.8	4,962.72	5,839.48	**6,933.48**				
Alliance	**Seamus Close**	10.69%	4,408	4,667.84	4,847.18	4,880.78	4,955.14	5,825.4	**6,295.4**			
SDLP	**Patricia Lewsley**	7.59%	3,133	3,153.88	3,232.62	3,236.46	3,251.10	3,342.74	3,381.74	3,535.74	**6,256.74**	
UUP	**Norah Beare**	3.66%	1,508	3,321.66	3,437.70	3,534.66	4,375.56	4,767.36	5,195.36	5,300.36	5,328.8	**5,657.44**
DUP	Andrew Hunter	8.00%	3,300	4,085.32	4,187.16	4,666.52	4,804.94	4,929.7	4,977.7	5,000.7	5,013.76	5,044.57
Sinn Féin	Paul Butler	7.86%	3,242	3,251.28	3,261.86	3,263.14	3,266.2	3,276.26	3,277.26	3,278.26		
Independent	Ivan Davis	5.39%	2,223	2,539.1	2,637.48	2,662.44	2,735					
UUP	Jim Kirkpatrick	1.64%	675	1,957.96	2,023.36	2,094.08						
NI Conservatives	Joanne Johnston	0.96%	395	462.86								
PUP	Andrew Park	0.51%	212	256.66								
Workers' Party	Frances McCarthy	0.24%	97	103.38								
Electorate: 67,910 Valid: 41,254 (60.75%) Spoilt: 470 Quota: 5,894 Turnout: 41,724 (61.44%)

==== 1998 ====
1998 Assembly election: Lagan Valley – 6 seats
Party	Candidate	FPv%	Count								
Party	Candidate	FPv%	1	2	3	4	5	6	7	8	9
Alliance	**Seamus Close**	14.59%	**6,788**								
UUP	**Billy Bell**	12.83%	5,965	5,984	6,163	6,309	**6,679**				
DUP	**Edwin Poots**	11.26%	5,239	5,266	5,319	5,333	5,370	5,371	**7,642**		
UUP	**Ivan Davis**	8.44%	3,927	3,945	4,042	4,130	4,593	4,604	4,793	4,869	**7,322**
UK Unionist	**Patrick Roche**	11.53%	5,361	5,398	5,493	5,507	5,542	5,543	5,879	6,622	**6,859**
SDLP	**Patricia Lewsley**	8.68%	4,039	4,066	4,069	4,414	4,431	6,191	6,192	6,194	**6,282**
Ulster Democratic	Gary McMichael	8.01%	3,725	3,765	3,805	3,955	4,045	4,075	4,240	4,319	4,970
UUP	David Campbell	6.79%	3,158	3,165	3,240	3,286	3,619	3,620	3,809	3,903	
DUP	Cecil Calvert	6.69%	3,111	3,120	3,191	3,199	3,210	3,216			
Sinn Féin	Paul Butler	4.30%	2,000	2,005	2,007	2,062	2,064				
UUP	Ken Hull	2.77%	1,289	1,295	1,327	1,381					
NI Women's Coalition	Annie Campbell	2.05%	955	988	1,013						
NI Conservatives	William Bleakes	1.51%	702	713							
Workers' Party	Frances McCarthy	0.45%	208								
Natural Law	John Collins	0.09%	43								
Electorate: 71,661 Valid: 46,510 (64.90%) Spoilt: 564 Quota: 6,645 Turnout: 47,074 (65.69%)

=== 1996 forum ===
Successful candidates are shown in bold.

Party	Candidate(s)	Votes	Percentage
UUP	**Jeffrey Donaldson**; **David Campbell**; **Ivan Davis**; William Dillon; Billy Bell	16,367	37.7
DUP	**Cecil Calvert**; **Edwin Poots**	9,592	22.1
Alliance	Seamus Close; Frazer McCammond; Mary Clark-Glass; Bill Whitley; Betty Campbell	4,508	10.4
SDLP	Peter O'Hagan; Hugh Lewsley	4,001	9.2
Ulster Democratic	Gary McMichael; Philip Dean	3,087	7.1
UK Unionist	Ronnie Crawford; Graeme Jardin	2,172	5.0
Sinn Féin	Patrick Rice; Michael Ferguson; Sue Ramsey	1,132	2.6
PUP	David Kirk; Wilfred Cummings	1,072	2.5
NI Women's Coalition	Jane Wilde; Fidelma Carolan; Sandra Craig; Bronya Bonar; Margaret Darcy	520	1.2
NI Conservatives	William Baird; Mary Love	386	0.8
Green (NI)	Malachy McAnespie; George Thompson; Penny Kemp	175	0.4
Ulster Independence	Carolyne Chance; Allan Thompson; James Kelley	164	0.4
Labour coalition	Ciaran Mulholland; William McAvoy	143	0.3
Workers' Party	Frances McCarthy; John Magee	72	0.2
Democratic Left	Liam Napier; Oliver Frawley	43	0.1
Natural Law	Duncan Paterson; Susanna Thompson	18	0.0
Independent Chambers	Eric Brown; Gary Strain	3	0.0
