= William Bleakes =

Northern Ireland politician (1933–2021)

Mayor of Lisburn
- In office 1988–1989

Member of Lisburn Borough Council
- In office 15 May 1985 – 7 June 2001
- Preceded by: District created
- Succeeded by: James Baird
- Constituency: Downshire
- In office 18 May 1977 – 15 May 1985
- Preceded by: Ivan McKeever
- Succeeded by: District abolished
- Constituency: Lisburn Area B

Member of the Northern Ireland Assembly for North Down
- In office 1982–1986
- Preceded by: Assembly re-established
- Succeeded by: Assembly dissolved

Personal details
- Born: 1933 Lisburn, Northern Ireland
- Died: 17 October 2021 (aged 88) Lisburn, Northern Ireland
- Party: Independent Unionist (1998–2001); NI Conservative (1989–1998)
- Other political affiliations: Ulster Unionist (1981–1989); United Ulster Unionist (until 1981)

William George Bleakes (1933 – 17 October 2021) was a Northern Irish unionist politician who served as Mayor of Lisburn from 1988 to 1989, as well as a Lisburn Borough Councillor from 1977 to 2001.

Additionally, Bleakes was a Member of the Northern Ireland Assembly (MLA) for North Down from 1982 until 1986.

== Career ==
Bleakes was first elected to Lisburn Borough Council in 1977 as a United Ulster Unionist Party (UUUP) councillor for 'Area B' (equivalent to the current 'Downshire' electoral area.) With the UUUP in decline, he switched to the Ulster Unionist Party (UUP) and was returned to Lisburn Council in 1981 for that party. In 1982 he contested the North Down Assembly constituency, which then included parts of Lisburn. He won the last seat, just six votes ahead of his nearest challenger, the closest margin of the election. He continued to serve as a UUP local councillor, serving as Mayor of Lisburn in 1988–89 before joining the Conservative Party. He was re-elected as a Conservative councillor in 1993 and 1997.

Bleakes stood unsuccessfully in the 1998 Northern Ireland Assembly election in Lagan Valley. He then left the Conservatives to sit as an independent Unionist. However, a change in electoral legislation meant that he was unable to run under that label in 2001 and he lost his seat standing as an independent.

== Death ==
Bleakes died in Lisburn on 17 October 2021, at the age of 88.

Northern Ireland Assembly (1982)
New assembly	MPA for North Down; 1982–1986	Assembly abolished
Civic offices
Unknown	Mayor of Lisburn; 1988–1989	Unknown
