= George Morrison (Northern Ireland politician) =

Member of Lisburn Borough Council
- In office 19 May 1993 – 7 June 2001
- Preceded by: District created
- Succeeded by: Paul Porter
- Constituency: Lisburn Town South
- In office 17 May 1989 – 19 May 1993
- Preceded by: James Davis
- Succeeded by: District abolished
- Constituency: Lisburn Town
- In office 30 May 1973 – 20 May 1981
- Preceded by: New district
- Succeeded by: Dennis McCarroll
- Constituency: Lisburn Area C

Member of the Constitutional Convention for South Antrim
- In office 1975–1976

Personal details
- Born: 23 November 1924
- Died: 22 October 2014 (aged 89)
- Party: Ulster Unionist (from 1983)
- Other political affiliations: United Ulster Unionist (1975 - 1983); Ulster Vanguard (1972 - 1975)

George Morrison (23 November 1924 – 22 October 2014) was a unionist politician from Northern Ireland.

== Early and personal life ==
Morrison was raised in Saintfield, having been "unofficially adopted" by the Kinghan family. He worked variously as a boilermaker at Harland & Wolff and in several positions at Lagan Valley Hospital. He married Emily in 1947 (being widowed in 2012) with the couple having two children, Isobel and Tommy.

== Political career ==
Morrison was a founder member of the Vanguard Unionist Progressive Party and chaired their Lisburn branch. He represented the VUPP in the Northern Ireland Constitutional Convention as a member for the South Antrim constituency. He was part of the majority group in the party that opposed leader Bill Craig's idea of a voluntary coalition with the Social Democratic and Labour Party and as such switched to the newly formed United Ulster Unionist Party in 1975. He was a member of the United Unionist Action Council that co-ordinated the failed Ulster Workers' Council strike of 1977.

Morrison was a member of Lisburn Borough Council from 1973 to 1993, representing the Ulster Unionist Party from 1983. A member of the Orange Order, he served the organisation in a number of prominent roles, including Lisburn district secretary, County Grand Master for Antrim, deputy Grand Secretary of the Grand Orange Lodge of Ireland and Honorary Deputy Grand Master of the Orange Order.

Whilst serving as Mayor of Lisburn in the early 1990s he took a heart attack but survived. However he suffered a second, this time fatal, heart attack in 2014 and died aged 89. He was buried after a service at Railway Street Presbyterian Church in the city.

Northern Ireland Constitutional Convention
New convention	Member for South Antrim; 1975–1976	Convention dissolved
Civic offices
Preceded by Harry Lewis	Mayor of Lisburn; 1996–1998	Succeeded by Peter O'Hagan
