= Cecil Calvert (politician) =

Northern Irish unionist politician

Member of Lisburn City Council
- In office 15 May 1985 – 5 May 2011
- Preceded by: District created
- Succeeded by: John Palmer
- Constituency: Killultagh

Member of the Northern Ireland Forum for Lagan Valley
- In office 30 May 1996 – 25 April 1998

Personal details
- Party: Independent Unionist (from 2011)
- Other political affiliations: TUV (2007–2011); DUP (before 2007)

Cecil Calvert was a Northern Irish unionist politician, who was a long-serving councillor on Lisburn City Council.

== Career ==
Calvert worked for the B Specials Constabulary and as a farmer before joining the Democratic Unionist Party (DUP). In 1985, he was elected to Lisburn Borough Council, representing Killultagh, County Antrim. He held his seat at each subsequent election, serving as Mayor of Lisburn in 2004 – 05.

Calvert was elected to the Northern Ireland Forum, representing Lagan Valley, but failed to take a seat at the 1998 Northern Ireland Assembly election.

Calvert carried a Union Jack during a St Patrick's Day parade in Seattle in 2005.

In June 2007, Calvert resigned from the DUP, objecting to the party's decision to enter government with Sinn Féin. He subsequently joined Traditional Unionist Voice (TUV) but resigned in March 2011.

Northern Ireland Forum
New forum	Member for Lagan Valley; 1996–1998	Forum dissolved
Civic offices
Preceded by Billy Bell	Mayor of Lisburn; 2004–2005	Succeeded by Jonathan Craig
