= Charles Poots =

Unionist politician in Northern Ireland (1929–2020)

Member of Lisburn Borough Council
- In office 15 May 1985 – 21 May 1997
- Preceded by: District created
- Succeeded by: Edwin Poots
- Constituency: Downshire
- In office 30 May 1973 – 15 May 1985
- Preceded by: District created
- Succeeded by: District abolished
- Constituency: Lisburn Area B

Member of the Northern Ireland Constitutional Convention for North Down
- In office 1975–1976

Member of the Northern Ireland Assembly for North Down
- In office 1973–1975

Personal details
- Born: 1929
- Died: 23 April 2020 (aged 90–91)
- Party: DUP (1971 - 2020)
- Other political affiliations: Protestant Unionist Party (1969 - 1971)

Charles Boucher "Charlie" Poots (1929 – 23 April 2020) was a Northern Irish unionist politician and farmer, known for being one of the founding members of the Democratic Unionist Party (DUP).

== Political career ==
Poots joined Ian Paisley's Free Presbyterian Church of Ulster, acting as Treasurer of the Hillsborough church. He also joined the Protestant Unionist Party (PUP), standing unsuccessfully for the group in Iveagh at the 1969 Northern Ireland general election. The PUP soon reformed as the Democratic Unionist Party (DUP), and Poots was elected to Lisburn Borough Council at the 1973 local elections. He also won a seat in North Down at the 1973 Northern Ireland Assembly election. Contemporary reports claim that he started a fist-fight at the Assembly in December, after throwing a punch at Basil McIvor and he was suspended in 1974 for one day after calling Brian Faulkner a "lying tramp".

Poots held his North Down seat on the Northern Ireland Constitutional Convention in 1975, but he lost it at the 1982 Assembly election. In 1976, shots were fired at his car while driving through the predominantly Irish nationalist Markets area of Belfast.

He held his Lisburn council seat until 1997, serving as Deputy Mayor in 1991/2.

His son, Edwin Poots, later became a DUP member of the Northern Ireland Assembly. Edwin was elected to the leadership of the party on 15 May 2021, effective from 28 May.

Charlie Poots died in April 2020, at the age of 90.

Northern Ireland Assembly (1973)
New assembly	Assembly Member for North Down; 1973–1974	Assembly abolished
Northern Ireland Constitutional Convention
New convention	Member for North Down; 1975–1976	Convention dissolved
