= Ivan Davis (politician) =

Northern Irish politician (1937–2020)

Mayor of Lisburn
- In office 1991–1993
- Preceded by: William McAllister
- Succeeded by: Seamus Close

Leader of the Ulster Unionist Party on Lisburn Borough Council
- In office 2001 – 5 May 2011

Member of Lisburn Borough Council
- In office 19 May 1993 – 5 May 2011
- Preceded by: District created
- Succeeded by: Roy Young
- Constituency: Lisburn Town South
- In office 15 May 1985 – 19 May 1993
- Preceded by: District created
- Succeeded by: District abolished
- Constituency: Lisburn Town
- In office 30 May 1973 – 15 May 1985
- Preceded by: Council established
- Succeeded by: District abolished
- Constituency: Lisburn Area D

Member of the Northern Ireland Assembly for Lagan Valley
- In office 25 June 1998 – 26 November 2003
- Preceded by: New Creation
- Succeeded by: Norah Beare

Northern Ireland Forum Member for Lagan Valley
- In office 30 May 1996 – 25 April 1998
- Preceded by: New forum
- Succeeded by: Forum dissolved

Member of the Northern Ireland Assembly for South Antrim
- In office 20 October 1982 – 1986

Personal details
- Born: 16 April 1937 Lisburn, Northern Ireland
- Died: 13 March 2020 (aged 82)
- Party: Ulster Unionist Party (from 1987)
- Other political affiliations: Democratic Unionist Party (until 1987)
- Other organisations: Orange Order member, Apprentice Boys member, Lisburn Citizens Advice Bureau member, Lisburn Sports Advisory Council member, Partnership of Peace & Reconciliation Committee member, Lisburn Swimming Club vice-president, Lisburn Amateur Boxing Club vice-president

Ivan Davis (16 April 1937 – 13 March 2020) was a Northern Irish unionist politician. Davis was an Ulster Unionist Party (UUP) Member of the Northern Ireland Assembly (MLA) for Lagan Valley from 1998 to 2003.

== Background ==
Born in Lisburn, Davis was elected to Lisburn Borough Council in 1973, representing the Democratic Unionist Party (DUP). He was also elected to represent South Antrim at the 1982 Northern Ireland Assembly election.

In 1987, Davis resigned from the DUP and instead joined the Ulster Unionist Party (UUP). Under this new party label, he served as Mayor of Lisburn from 1991 to 93. He was also elected for Lagan Valley at the Northern Ireland Forum election in 1996 (with Jeffrey Donaldson and David Campbell), and narrowly held this seat at the 1998 Assembly election. During the course of the Assembly, he became UUP chief whip.

Lagan Valley UUP controversially did not select Davis as a candidate for the 2003 Assembly election, so he resigned and stood instead as an independent Unionist. He received 2,223 first-preference votes, but this did not prove sufficient to see him elected despite polling more first preferences than one successful candidate.

Despite this, Davis continued to sit as a UUP member, and leader of the UUP group, on Lisburn City Council until 2011.

Davis died on 13 March 2020, at the age of 82.

== Bibliography ==
- Biography – Ivan Davis, Northern Ireland Assembly

Northern Ireland Forum
New forum	Member for Lagan Valley; 1996–1998	Forum dissolved
Northern Ireland Assembly (1982)
New assembly	MPA for South Antrim; 1982–1986	Assembly abolished
Northern Ireland Assembly
New assembly	MLA for Lagan Valley; 1998–2003	Succeeded by Norah Beare
Civic offices
Unknown	Mayor of Lisburn; 1991–1993	Succeeded by Seamus Close
