= Seamus Close =

Northern Irish politician (1947–2019)

Deputy leader of the Alliance Party of Northern Ireland
- In office 1991 – 22 June 2001
- Leader: John Alderdice; Séan Neeson
- Preceded by: Gordon Mawhinney
- Succeeded by: Eileen Bell

Member of the Northern Ireland Assembly for Lagan Valley
- In office 25 June 1998 – 7 March 2007
- Preceded by: New Creation
- Succeeded by: Trevor Lunn

Northern Ireland Forum Member
- In office 30 May 1996 – 25 April 1998
- Preceded by: New forum
- Succeeded by: Forum dissolved
- Constituency: Top-up list

Personal details
- Born: Seamus Anthony Close; 12 August 1947
- Died: 7 May 2019 (aged 71)
- Party: Alliance
- Spouse: Deirdre

Seamus Anthony Close OBE (12 August 1947 – 7 May 2019) was a Northern Irish politician who was deputy leader of the Alliance Party from 1998 to 2001, and a Member of the Legislative Assembly (MLA) for Lagan Valley from 1998 to 2007.

== Political career ==
In August 1981, he was the Alliance candidate for the second Fermanagh and South Tyrone by-election. The following year under the redistribution and expansion of Northern Ireland's constituencies his local political base became part of the new Lagan Valley constituency which he has contested in the Alliance interest in all elections since 1983 apart from the 1986 by-election called in protest against the Anglo-Irish Agreement when the local Alliance branch declined to contest the seat as they believed the by-election was a political stunt.

Close also held several positions in the Alliance, including serving as chair between 1981 and 1982 and as Deputy Leader from 1991 until 2001. He was often a member of the key Alliance delegations in successive talks about the future of the province, culminating in the Belfast Agreement of 1998.

In the 1996 elections for the Northern Ireland Forum, Close stood at the head of the Alliance's list for Lagan Valley but the party failed to secure enough votes to win one of the local seats. Close was also included on the province-wide list, and as the most senior Alliance member to not be elected locally he won one of Alliance's two seats. In the 1998 election for the new Northern Ireland Assembly he topped the poll in Lagan Valley and gained a further personal triumph in the 2001 general election when he had the highest vote share of any Alliance candidate.

In June 2001, he resigned as Deputy Leader of the party, citing differences with the leadership of Seán Neeson. Close has remained a member of the Assembly and successfully held his seat in the 2003 Assembly election.

In July 2005, Mr Close proposed that the Lisburn Council deny gay couples access to the council's designated wedding facility if they were seeking a civil partnership under the Civil Partnership Act 2004. The council adopted his recommendation, to the great annoyance of many liberal campaigners. This ran against Alliance policy, which had been strongly supportive of the introduction of civil partnership laws, and he was publicly criticised by other senior party members.

In November 2006, Close announced that he was retiring from politics In the 2007 election he was succeeded as Alliance Party Lagan Valley Assembly representative by the then Mayor of Lisburn, Councillor Trevor Lunn.

Close was succeeded as Mayor of Lisburn by Harry Lewis.

Northern Ireland Assembly (1982)
New assembly	MPA for South Antrim; 1982–1986	Assembly abolished
Northern Ireland Forum
New forum	Regional Member; 1996–1998	Forum dissolved
Northern Ireland Assembly
New assembly	MLA for Lagan Valley; 1998–2007	Succeeded by Trevor Lunn
Party political offices
Preceded by Gordon Mawhinney	Deputy Leader of the Alliance Party of Northern Ireland; 1991–2001	Succeeded by Eileen Bell
Civic offices
Preceded by Ivan Davis	Mayor of Lisburn; 1993–1994	Succeeded by Harry Lewis
