= United Ulster Unionist Party =

- Leader: Ernest Baird
- Deputy Leader: Reg Empey
- Founded: 1975
- Dissolved: May 1984
- Split from: Ulster Vanguard
- Ideology: Ulster loyalism Anti-Power Sharing; Return of devolution
- National affiliation: UUUC (1975-77)

The United Ulster Unionist Party (UUUP) was a unionist political party which existed in Northern Ireland between 1975 and 1984.

It emerged from a division in the Vanguard Unionist Progressive Party in the late 1970s. Vanguard had traditionally opposed the concept of compulsory power sharing with nationalists enshrined in the Sunningdale Agreement, but after the failure of Sunningdale, the Northern Ireland Constitutional Convention was set up to provide a forum with the aim of finding a new settlement for Northern Ireland. During the proceedings the leader of Vanguard, William Craig, proposed a voluntary coalition with the nationalist Social Democratic and Labour Party. Many in Vanguard found this anathema, including the party's deputy leader Ernest Baird, Mid Ulster MP John Dunlop and East Belfast Convention member (and future Ulster Unionist Party leader) Reg Empey. They left Vanguard and formed the United Ulster Unionist Movement. Initially Baird insisted that this was not a party since the original aim was to create a single Unionist party. When this aim proved unattainable, the UUUM became a party, rebranding as the United Ulster Unionist Party on 26 April 1977, led by Baird, with Empey as Deputy Leader and Cecil Harvey as Chief Whip and Chairman.

Many critics highlighted the irony of the name, given that the UUUP was a breakaway from Vanguard, itself a breakaway from the Ulster Unionist Party and there were many other Unionist parties in existence. The name is deliberately evocative of the United Ulster Unionist Council which was once heavily steered by the founding members of the UUUP.

The UUUP did not prosper long. In the 1979 general election Dunlop held his seat but only due to an agreement with other unionist parties to not divide the unionist vote where a nationalist might get elected. Elsewhere Baird stood in Fermanagh and South Tyrone, dividing the unionist vote but polling poorly. It has been argued that it was Baird's candidacy that ensured a victory for Frank Maguire in the seat.

The decline was evident even before the local government elections of 1981 as 4 of the 12 UUUP councillors elected in 1977 had defected to other Unionist parties (2 to UUP, 1 to DUP and 1 to the Ulster Popular Unionist Party). The party had a miserable showing in the 1981 elections with its overall vote share declining from 2.8% in 1977 to 0.7% in 1981. It only won 5 council seats (a decline of 7 seats) and even then one of these was purely due to a quirk of the electoral system, as the party only polled 105 votes (1.6%) in Lisburn 'E' against 1,909 (30.0%) for the DUP and 1,830 (28.7%) for the UUP. However they benefited from the other two Unionist parties only putting up one candidate each and benefitted from hefty transfers to win an unlikely seat. The party didn't stand at all in the first European Parliament election (1979) because of its opposition to the EEC's existence.

In 1982 a new Northern Ireland Assembly was established to provide a degree of scrutiny over the Secretary of State for Northern Ireland. The UUUP got a derisory vote, with even Dunlop getting barely 3% of the vote in his Mid Ulster constituency. The party soon folded. Dunlop remained as MP for Mid Ulster until the 1983 general election but did not contest his seat. The formal end came in May 1984 when Baird dissolved the party and left it to individual members to choose which Unionist party to join in its wake.

== Election results: 1979 ==
Constituency	Candidate	Votes	%	Position
Fermanagh and South Tyrone	Ernest Baird	10,607	17.0	4
Mid Ulster	John Dunlop	29,249	44.7	1
