= Lisburn City Council =

Former city council in Counties Antrim and Down

Coordinates: 54.511°N 6.043°W

- Area: 447 km^{2} (173 sq mi); Ranked 16th of 26
- District HQ: Lisburn
- Catholic: 36.5%
- Protestant: 55.9%
- Country: Northern Ireland
- Sovereign state: United Kingdom

Lisburn City Council was the local authority for an area partly in County Antrim and partly in County Down in Northern Ireland. As of May 2015 it was merged with Castlereagh Borough Council as part of the reform of local government in Northern Ireland to become Lisburn and Castlereagh City Council.

Created in 1974, the council was the second largest in the Belfast Metropolitan Area. Council headquarters were in the city of Lisburn. It was the second-largest council area in Northern Ireland with over 120,000 people and an area of 174 square miles (450 km^{2}) of southwest Antrim and northwest Down. The council area included Glenavy and Dundrod in the north, Dromara and Hillsborough in the south, Moira and Aghalee in the west, and Drumbo in the east.

The council area consisted of five electoral areas: Downshire, Dunmurry Cross, Killultagh, Lisburn Town North and Lisburn Town South. It had 30 councillors, last elected in 2011. The final composition was: 14 Democratic Unionist Party (DUP), 5 Ulster Unionist Party (UUP), 5 Sinn Féin, 3 Alliance Party and 3 Social Democratic and Labour Party (SDLP).

For elections to the Westminster Parliament, the council area was split between the Lagan Valley constituency, Belfast West and South Antrim constituencies.

The first elections for the new council took place in May 2014.

== Constituent cities, towns and villages ==
1. Aghalee
2. Annahilt
3. Dunmurry
4. Drumbo
5. Dromara
6. Glenavy
7. Hillsborough
8. Lisburn
9. Maghaberry
10. Moira

== Summary of seats won 1973-2011 ==
Map of the city's DEAs from 1993 to 2014

	1973	1977	1981	1985	1989	1993	1997	2001	2005	2011
Ulster Unionist Party (UUP)	14	9	8	13	15	16	13	13	7	5
Democratic Unionist Party (DUP)	4	6	10	8	5	3	2	5	13	14
Alliance (APNI)	3	3	2	3	2	2	3	3	3	3
Vanguard (VUPP)	1									
Social Democratic and Labour Party (SDLP)	1	1	2	2	3	3	2	3	3	3
United Ulster Unionist Party (UUUP)		2	1							
Sinn Féin (SF)				2	2	3	4	4	4	5
Independent Conservative (IndCon)					1					
Northern Ireland Conservatives (Con)						1	1			
Ulster Democratic Party (UDP)						1	2	1		
Independent Unionist (IU)						1	2	1		
Independent							1			

Notes: The independent elected in 1997 was Hugh Lewsley, a former SDLP councillor. William Beattie was elected as a "Protestant Unionist" in 1997, but is tallied as an Independent Unionist above. New legislation introduced for the 2001 elections required candidates to register party names for these to appear on the ballot paper, this also made it impossible for candidates to stand as Independent Unionist. The UDP missed the deadline for registration and their candidate, party leader Gary McMichael, was elected as an independent. The other candidate elected as an independent in 2001, described himself as a Unionist on the council website.

Source: ARK Retrieved 13 January 2013

== 2011 Election results ==
2011 saw the continued advancement of the DUP and Sinn Féin within the council Area. In Downshire, the DUP picked up a seat from the UUP, and in Dunmurry Cross, Sinn Féin gained from the SDLP. However the SDLP loss was compensated by changing demographics in the Lisburn Town North DEA, where the SDLP took a seat for the first time. There were no changes in the Killutagh or Lisburn Town South DEAs. The election saw the DUP return all their candidates with the exception of Ben Mallon, a local student standing in Lisburn North.

Party		seats	change +/-
•	Democratic Unionist Party	14	+1
•	Ulster Unionist Party	5	-2
•	Sinn Féin	5	+1
•	Social Democratic and Labour Party	3	=
•	Alliance Party of Northern Ireland	3	=
•	Independent	0	=

== Mayors of Lisburn ==
- 1964 - 70: James Howard (1st Mayor of the Borough of Lisburn)
- 1970 - 73: Hugh Gray Bass
- 1977 - 78: Elsie Kelsey, Ulster Unionist Party
- 1978 - 79: George McCartney.
- 1979 - 81: Dr Samuel Semple, Ulster Unionist Party
- 1981 - 83: Billy Belshaw, Democratic Unionist Party
- 1983 - 85: Maureen McKinney, Ulster Unionist Party
- 1985 - 87: Walter Lilburn, Ulster Unionist Party
- 1987 - 88:
- 1988 - 89: Billy Bleakes, Ulster Unionist Party
- 1990 - 91: Willam McAllister, Ulster Unionist Party
- 1991 - 93: Ivan Davis, Ulster Unionist Party
- 1993 - 94: Seamus Close, Alliance Party of Northern Ireland
- 1994 - 96: Harry Lewis Ulster Unionist Party
- 1996 - 98?: George Morrison, Ulster Unionist Party
- 1998 - 00: Peter O'Hagan, Social Democratic and Labour Party
- 2000 - 02: Jim Dillon, Ulster Unionist Party
- 2002 - 03: Betty Campbell, Alliance Party of Northern Ireland
- 2003 - 04: Billy Bell, Ulster Unionist Party
- 2004 - 05: Cecil Calvert, Democratic Unionist Party
- 2005 - 06: Jonathan Craig, Democratic Unionist Party
- 2006 - 07: Trevor Lunn, Alliance Party of Northern Ireland
- 2007 - 08: James Tinsley, Democratic Unionist Party
- 2008 - 09: Ronnie Crawford, Ulster Unionist Party
- 2009 - 10: Allan Ewart, Democratic Unionist Party
- 2010 - 11: Paul Porter, Democratic Unionist Party
- 2011 - 12: Brian Heading, Social Democratic and Labour Party
- 2012 - 13: William Leathem, Democratic Unionist Party
- 2013 - 14: Margaret Tolerton, Democratic Unionist Party
- 2014 - 15: Andrew Ewing, Democratic Unionist Party
- 2015 - 16: Thomas Beckett, Democratic Unionist Party
- 2016 - 17 - Brian Bloomfield, Ulster Unionist Party
- 2017 - 18: Tim Morrow, Alliance Party of Northern Ireland
- 2018 - 19: Uel Mackin, Democratic Unionist Party
- 2019 - 20: Alan Givan, Democratic Unionist Party
- 2020 - 21: Nicholas Trimble, Ulster Unionist Party
- 2021 - 22: Stephen Martin, Alliance Party of Northern Ireland
- 2022 - 23: Scott Carson, Democratic Unionist Party
- 2023 - 24: Andrew Gowan, Democratic Unionist Party
- 2024 - 25: Kurtis Dickson, Alliance Party of Northern Ireland
- 2025 - 2026: Amanda Grehan, Alliance Party of Northern Ireland
- 2026 - present: Brian Higginson, Democratic Unionist Party

== Review of Public Administration ==
Under the Review of Public Administration (RPA) the council was due to merge with Castlereagh Borough Council in 2011 to form a single council for the enlarged area totalling 540 km^{2} and a population of 175,182. An election was due to take place in May 2009, but on 25 April 2008, Shaun Woodward, Secretary of State for Northern Ireland announced that the scheduled 2009 district council elections were to be postponed until the introduction of the eleven new councils in 2011. The introduction of the new councils was subsequently postponed until 2015.

== Population ==
The area covered by Lisburn City Council had a population of 149,106 residents according to the 2021 Northern Ireland census.

== See also ==
- Local government in Northern Ireland
- Lisburn and Castlereagh City Council
