= Timeline of young people's rights in the United Kingdom =

The timeline of children's rights in the United Kingdom includes a variety of events that are both political and grassroots in nature.

The UK government maintains a position that the United Nations Convention on the Rights of the Child (UNCRC) is not legally enforceable and is hence 'aspirational' only, although a 2003 ECHR ruling states that, "The human rights of children and the standards to which all governments must aspire in realising these rights for all children are set out in the Convention on the Rights of the Child." Eighteen years after ratification, the four Children's Commissioners in the UK (including those for the three devolved administrations) have united in calling for adoption of the Convention into domestic legislation, making children's rights recognised and legally binding.

Opponents of children's rights often raise the objection that rights must entail responsibilities. The children's rights movement asserts rather that children have rights which adults, states and the government have a responsibility to uphold. Overall, a 2008 report stated that there had been no improvement in children's rights in the UK since 2002. Warning that there is a "widely held fear of children and young people" in the UK, the report says: "The incessant portrayal of children as thugs and yobs" not only reinforces the fears of the public but also influences policy and legislation." The report does not address the question of the degree to which the fear of uncontrolled children in the UK is justified.

The UNCRC defines children, for the purposes of the Convention, as persons under the age 18, unless domestic legislation provides otherwise. In that spirit, this timeline includes as children all those below the UK age of majority, which was 21 until 1970 when it was reduced to 18. Although the Crown Dependencies of the Isle of Man, Guernsey and Jersey are not constitutionally part of the UK, the British government is responsible for their external affairs and therefore for their international treaty obligations, so this timeline includes references to matters in those dependencies.

== Pre-19th century ==
Timeline of pre-19th century events related to Children's Rights in the UK and the countries that preceded it in chronological order
Date	Parties	Event	Image
Pre-16th century		The care of orphans was particularly commended to bishops and monasteries during the Middle Ages. Many orphanages practised a form of "binding-out" in which children, as soon as they were old enough, were given as apprentices to households to ensure their support and their learning an occupation. Common law maintaining the King's Peace was administered by the Court of Common Pleas (England) dealing with civil cases between parties by ordering the fine of debts and seizure of the goods of outlaws. Following the Peasants' Revolt, constables in England were authorised under a 1383 statute to collar vagabonds and force them to show their means of support; if they could not, the penalty was gaol. Under a 1494 statute, vagabonds could be sentenced to the stocks for three days and nights; in 1530, whipping was added. The assumption was that vagabonds were unlicensed beggars.	
January 1561	Scotland	The national Church of Scotland set out a programme for spiritual reform, setting the principle of a school teacher for every parish church and free education. This was provided for by an Act of the Parliament of Scotland, passed in 1633, which introduced a tax to pay for this programme.	
1367–1607	Ireland	Suppression of the Brehon Laws which enumerated the rights and responsibilities of fostered children, their birth-parents and foster-parents. The Brehon Law concept of family was eroded and the Gaelic tradition of fosterage lost. It was ultimately replaced by the State controlled Poor Law system.	
1601	Elizabethan Poor Law	The Poor Law was the social security system operating in England and Wales from the 16th century until the establishment of the Welfare State in the 20th century. The Impotent poor was a classification of poverty used to refer to those poor considered deserving of poor relief; a vagrant was a person who could work, but preferred not to. The law did not distinguish between the impotent poor and the criminal, so both received the same punishments. The law provided for "the putting out of children to be apprentices".	
17th century		Where an unmarried mother concealed the death of her baby, she was presumed guilty of infanticide unless she could prove that the baby was born dead. This requirement that the defendant prove her innocence was a reversal of the normal practice of requiring the prosecution to prove the defendant's guilt. Women were acquitted of this charge if they could demonstrate that they had prepared for the birth of the baby, for example by acquiring bedding. In 1678 children aged 10 were deemed able to engage in consensual sex.	
1732–1744	Bastardy	In 1732, a woman pregnant with a "bastard" was required to declare the fact and to name the father. In 1733, the putative father became responsible for maintaining his illegitimate child; failing to do so could result in gaol. The parish would then support the mother and child, until the father agreed to do so, whereupon he would reimburse the parish – although this rarely happened. In 1744, a bastard took the 'settlement' of its mother (under the Poor Law, a person's place of origin or later established residence, being the parish responsible for the person if destitute) regardless of where the child was actually born. Previously, a bastard took settlement from its place of birth. The mother was to be publicly whipped.	
1739	The Foundling Hospital	Established in London by the philanthropic sea captain Thomas Coram as a home for the "education and maintenance of exposed and deserted young children." Children were seldom taken after they were twelve months old. On reception they were sent to wet nurses in the countryside, where they stayed until they were about four or five years old. At sixteen girls were generally apprenticed as servants for four years; at fourteen, boys became apprentices in varying occupations for seven years.	
1779	The Penitentiary Act	Drafted by Prison reformer John Howard, the Act introduced state prisons as an alternative to the death penalty or transportation. The prison population had risen after the US Declaration of Independence, because the American Colonies had been used as the destination for transported criminals. Howard's 1777 report had identified appalling conditions in most of the prisons he inspected. The Howard League for Penal Reform emerged as a result.	
1795	Speenhamland system	An amendment to the Poor Law, named after a meeting at the Pelican Inn in Speenhamland, Berkshire, where the local magistrates or squirearchy devised the system as a means to alleviate hardship caused by a spike in grain prices. Families were paid extra to top up wages to a set level, which varied according to the number of children and the price of bread. For example, if bread was 1s 2d a loaf, the wages of a family with two children was topped up to 8s 6d. If bread rose to 1s 8d the wages were topped up to 11s 0d. The system aggravated the underlying causes of poverty, allowing employers (often farmers) to pay below subsistence wages, because the parish made up the difference to keep their workers alive. Low incomes remained unchanged and the poor rate contributors subsidised the farmers, so that landowners sought other means of dealing with the poor e.g. the workhouse. The Poor Law Commissioners' Report of 1834 called the Speenhamland System a "universal system of pauperism."	
1796	Thomas Spence	Publication of The Rights of Infants by the revolutionary philosopher.	

== 19th century ==
Timeline of 19th century events related to Children's Rights in the UK in chronological order
Date	Parties	Event	Image
1802	UK Parliament	The Factory Acts were a series of Acts of Parliament passed to limit the number of hours worked by women and children, first in the textile industry, then later in all industries. The Factories Act 1802, sometimes called the "Health and Morals of Apprentices Act,"	
1806	Philanthropic Society	The Society was incorporated by Act of Parliament, sanctioning its work with juvenile delinquents and began by opening homes where children were trained in cottage industries working under the instruction of skilled tradesmen. Remaining central in development of measures dealing with young offenders the Society is now the charity, Catch 22, formerly Rainer.	
1818	Ragged schools	A cobbler, John Pounds, began to use his shop in Portsmouth as a base for educational activity for local poor children neglected by other institutions. Part of his concern was also to educate his disabled nephew. The Ragged School movement subsequently found powerful support in active philanthropists when public attention was aroused to the prevalence of juvenile delinquency by Thomas Guthrie in 1840. An estimated 300,000 children passed through the London Ragged Schools alone between the early 1840s and 1881	
1818	Elizabeth Fry	After visiting Newgate Prison, Fry became particularly concerned at the conditions in which women prisoners and their children were held. Fry later presented evidence to the House of Commons in 1818, which led to the interior of Newgate being rebuilt with individual cells.	
1834	Workhouse	The workhouse system was set up in England and Wales under the Poor Law Amendment Act 1834, although many individual houses existed before this legislation. Inmates entered and left as they liked and would receive free food and accommodation. However, workhouse life was made as harsh and degrading as possible so that only the truly destitute would apply. Accounts of the terrible conditions in some workhouses include references to women who would not speak and children who refused to play.	
1838	Charles Dickens	Oliver Twist, Dickens' second novel, is the first in the English language to centre upon a child protagonist throughout. The book calls attention to various contemporary social evils, including the Poor Law, which required that poor people work in workhouses, child labour and the recruitment of children as criminals. A later character, Jo in Bleak House, is portrayed as a street child, relentlessly pursued by a police inspector.	
1839	Custody of Infants Act	Custody of children under 7 years old was assigned to mothers	
1840	Mettray Penal Colony	In Mettray, north of the city of Tours, France a private reformatory, without walls, was opened by penal reformer Frédéric-Auguste Demetz in 1840 for the rehabilitation of young males aged between 6 and 21. At that time children and teenagers were routinely imprisoned with adults. Boys who were mostly deprived, disadvantaged or abandoned children, many of whom had committed only Summary offences or petty crime, were housed. Their heads were shaved, they wore uniforms, and up to age 12 spent most of the day studying arithmetic, writing and reading. Older boys had one hour of classes, with the rest of the day spent working. Reformatory Schools were modelled on Mettray, and the Borstal system, established in 1905, separated adolescents from adult prisoners. In the twentieth century Mettray became the focus for Michel Foucault because of its various systems and expressions of power and led Foucault to suggest that Mettray began the descent into modern penal theories and their inherent power structures.	
1847	Juvenile Offenders Act	The Act allowed children under the age of fourteen to be tried summarily before two magistrates, speeding up the process of trial for children, and removing it from the publicity of the higher courts. The age limit was raised to sixteen in 1850.	
1850	Irish Workhouse Returns, 8 June 1850.	The number of children aged 15 years and younger in Irish Workhouses reaches its historic high, at 115,639.	
1854	Reformatory Schools	Mary Carpenter's research and lobbying contributed to the Youthful Offenders Act 1854 and the Reformatory Schools (Scotland) Act 1854. These enabled voluntary schools to be certified as efficient by the Inspector of Prisons, and allowed courts to send them convicted juvenile offenders under 16 for a period of 2 to 5 years, instead of prison. Parents were required to contribute to the cost. Carpenter's 1851 publication Reformatory Schools for the Children of the Perishing and Dangerous Classes and for Juvenile Offenders was the first to coin the term 'Dangerous Classes' with respect to the lower classes, and the perceived propensity to criminality, of poor people.	
1857	Industrial Schools	The Industrial Schools Act 1857 allowed magistrates to send disorderly children to a residential industrial school, resolving the problems of juvenile delinquency by removing poor and neglected children from their home environment into a boarding school. An 1876 Act led to non-residential day schools of a similar kind. In 1986 Professor Sir Leon Radzinowitz noted the practice of Economic conscription, where, 'there was a network of 208 schools: 43 reformatories, 132 industrial schools, 21-day industrial schools and 12 truant schools' by the eve of the First World War, alongside a negligible education system for the poor.	
1870	UK Government	Prior to the Elementary Education Act 1870 (33 & 34 Vict. c. 75), very few schools existed, other than those run by the Church. The National Education League was established to promote elementary education for all children, free from religious control. The Act first introduced and enforced compulsory school attendance between the ages of 5 and 12, with school boards set up to ensure that children attended school; although exemptions were made for illness and travelling distance. The London School Board was highly influential and launched a number of political careers. The Church/State ethical divide in schooling, persists into the present day.	
1870	Thomas John Barnardo	The first of 112 Barnardo's Homes was founded, with destitution as the criterion for qualification. The project was supported by the seventh Earl of Shaftesbury and the first Earl Cairns. The system of operation was broadly as follows: infants and younger girls and boys are chiefly "boarded out" in rural districts; girls above 14 years of age are sent to 'industrial training homes' to be taught useful domestic occupations; boys above 17 years old are first tested in labour homes and then placed in employment at home, sent to sea or emigrated; boys between 13 – 17 years old were trained for trades for which they may be mentally or physically fitted.	
1880	UK Government	Following campaigning by the National Education League the Elementary Education Act 1880 made schooling compulsory until the age of ten and also established attendance officers to enforce attendance, so that parents who objected to compulsory education, arguing they needed children to earn a wage, could be fined for keeping their children out of school. School leaving age was raised with successive Acts from ten to age fourteen in 1918.	
1885	UK Government	Criminal Law Amendment Act 1885 raises age of consent from 13 to 16, introduced measures intended to protect girls from sexual exploitation and widens the criminalisation of male homosexual behaviour.	
1891	UK Government	The practice of 'spiriting' i.e. kidnapping children for work in the Americas, had been sanctioned by the Privy Council since 1620, but the Custody of Children Act (the 'Barnardo's Act) legalised the work of private emigration societies for removing poor children from workhouses, industrial schools, reformatories and private care facilities, to British colonies.	
1899	UK Government	The Elementary Education (Defective and Epileptic Children) Act allowed school authorities to make arrangements for ascertaining which children, by reason of mental or physical defect, were incapable of receiving proper benefit from instruction in the ordinary schools.	

== 20th century ==
Timeline of 20th century events related to Children's Rights in the UK in chronological order
Date	Parties	Event	Image
1904	UK Government	The Prevention of Cruelty to Children Act gave the NSPCC a statutory right to intervene in child protection cases.	
1905	UK Government	A specialist juvenile offenders court was tried in Birmingham, and formally established in the Children Act 1908 (8 Edw. 7. c. 67), along with juvenile courts. Borstals, a kind of youth prison, were established under the Prevention of Crime Act, with the aim of separating youths from adult prisoners.	
1910	Home Office	Allegations in John Bull of abuse at a boys' reformatory, the Akbar Nautical Training School, Heswall, included accusations that boys were gagged before being birched, that boys who were ill were caned as malingerers, and that punishments included boys being drenched with cold water or being made to stand up all night for a trivial misdemeanour. John Bull further alleged that boys had died as a result of such punishments. The Home Office investigation rejected the allegations, but found that there had been instances of "irregular punishments".	
1914	New Ideals in Education Conferences	In 1914 the first Montessori Conference was held in the UK, at a beachside village called East Runton, Norfolk, at the site of the first Montessori School created outside Italy. The organisers were Rev Bertrand Hawker (whose house and grounds hosted the conference), Edmond Holmes (a previous chief Inspector of Schools), and Earl Lytton. The heroes of the conference were Homer Lane, Harriet Finlay Johnson and Norman MacMunn. They went on to form a committee to organise annual conferences founded on 'liberating the child', they called the events New Ideals in Education Conferences. They went on to have 'experimental days' that celebrated and shared good practice for liberating the child. People who spoke at the conferences included Percy Nunn (first director of Institute of Education), Lord Baden Powell, The Rt Hon. H.A.L Fisher MP cabinet war member for Education, Dr Arthur Brock (therapist to Wilfred Owen). They helped through legislation, practice and teacher training, to define the good primary school as child centred, group work, project work, learning through creativity, self-expression, peer teaching, play. They knew from the beginning that they may fail with the secondary schools because of exams, national curriculum, and parents.	
1915	A. S. Neill	In 1915 the teacher A.S.Neill wrote his first book in his Dominie series of semi-autobiographical novels, A Dominie's Log. This was the first of his writings to promote and advocate for children's rights in UK schools, especially the rights to play, to protection and to control their own learning. He went on to found what is now the oldest school based on children's rights, Summerhill (1921). The school and Neill's writings went on to influence schools and education systems around the world, including the UK.	
January 1916	UK Government	In the early years of the 20th century the National Service League had urged compulsory military training for all men aged between 18 and 30. After the outbreak of World War I, two million men enlisted voluntarily, some in Pals battalions but mostly in regular regiments and corps. Enthusiasm diminished as casualties increased, and the Military Service Act of January 1916 introduced conscription. Boys from the age of 18 were liable to be called up for service Men of Class 1 (that is, 18-year-olds), once enrolled, were given the option of returning home or remaining with the Colours and undergoing special training until they were 19. At the start of 1914 the British Army had a reported strength of 710,000 men including reserves. By the end of the war almost 1 in 4 of the total male population of the UK had joined, over five million men, and almost half the infantry were 19 or younger. Conscription ceased with the termination of hostilities on 11 November 1918 and all conscripts were discharged, if they had not already been so, on 31 March 1920.	
1918	Maternity and Child Welfare Act	The War prompted the government to direct funds towards infant welfare centres, and the Act encouraged local authorities to continue this work by introducing the principle of free ante-natal care and free medical care of under-fives. Most of the work was undertaken by volunteers, who were able to claim support for the resources they used. These measures taken together contributed to an astonishing decline in infant mortality in the first three decades of the 20th century.	
1919	Save the Children Fund	In the aftermath of the Great War social reformer Eglantyne Jebb and her sister Dorothy Buxton documented the terrible misery in which the children of Central, Eastern and Southern Europe were plunged, and believing there was no such thing as an "enemy" child, founded the Save the Children Fund in London to address their needs. The Save the Children International Union (SCIU) was founded in Geneva in 1920 with Save the Children and Swedish Rädda Barnen as leading members. Jebb went on to draft the Declaration of the Rights of the Child.	
1921	Summerhill School	As portrayed in his Dominie book, A Dominie Abroad (Herbert Jenkins, 1923), A.S.Neill founded what would become known as Summerhill School in Hellerau, a suburb of Dresden. It was part of an International school called the Neue Schule. Neill moved his school to Sonntagsberg in Austria. By 1923 Neill had moved to the town of Lyme Regis in the south of England, to a house called Summerhill where he began with 5 pupils. The school continued there until 1927, when it moved to the present site at Leiston in the county of Suffolk, taking the name of Summerhill with it. The Secretary of the UN Committee on the Rights of the Child wrote in support of the school when it faced closure from Government inspectors, that it 'surpasses all expectations' in its implementation of children's rights, particularly Article 12. Children's BBC made a four-part drama called Summerhill based on its fight for survival against the government.	
March 1921	Family Planning	Marie Stopes opened the UK's first family planning clinic in London, the Mothers' Clinic, offering a free service to married women and gathering scientific data about contraception. The opening of the clinic created a major social impact on the 20th century, marking the start of a new era in fertility control by promising an opportunity for the modern world to break out of the Malthusian Trap. A Eugenicist, Stopes' brand of Feminism sought selective breeding to achieve racial purity, sterilisation of those 'unfit for parenthood'.	
1932	Children and Young Persons (Scotland) Act	The Act provided for young offenders, to be sent to an approved school, put on probation, or put into the care of a "fit person". Courts could, in addition, still sentence male juvenile offenders, as previously, to be "whipped with not more than six strokes of a birch rod by a constable".	
1932/33	UK Government	The Children and Young Persons Act 1932 (22 & 23 Geo. 5. c. 46) broadened the powers of juvenile courts in England and Wales and introduced supervision orders for children at risk. The Children and Young Persons Act 1933 provided for young offenders, to be sent to an approved school, put on probation, or put into the care of a "fit person". Courts could, in addition, still sentence male juvenile offenders, as previously, to be "whipped with not more than six strokes of a birch rod by a constable". The Act also introduced Remand Homes for youths temporarily held in custody, to await a court hearing. The Home Office maintained a team of inspectors who visited each institution from time to time. Offenders, as well as receiving academic tuition, were assigned to work groups for such activities as building and bricklaying, metalwork, carpentry and gardening. Approved schools were known for strict discipline, and were essentially "open" institutions from which it was relatively easy to abscond. This allowed the authorities to claim that they were not "Reformatories", and set them apart from Borstal. The age of criminal responsibility was raised from 7 to 8, and no-one could be hanged for an offence committed under the age of 18. The Act consolidated most existing child protection legislation, enforcing strict punishments for anyone over 16 found to have neglected a child. Guidelines on the employment of school-age children were set, with a minimum age of 14 for full-time employment.	
November 1938	Kindertransport	A few days after Kristallnacht in Nazi Germany, a delegation of British Jewish leaders, appealed in person to the Prime Minister, Neville Chamberlain, on the eve of a major Commons debate on refugees. They requested that the British government permit the temporary admission of Jewish children and teenagers who would later re-emigrate, among other measures. The Jewish community promised to pay guarantees for the refugee children. The Cabinet decided that the nation would accept unaccompanied children ranging from infants up to teenagers under the age of 17.	
April 1939	UK Government	The Military Training Act sought to 'call up' boys from age 18 as 'militiamen', to distinguish them from the regular army. The intention was for conscripts to undergo six months basic training before being discharged into an active reserve, for subsequent recall to short training periods and an annual camp. Superseded by the National Service (Armed Forces) Act 1939 enacted immediately by Parliament on 3 September 1939 - the date of declaration of war on Germany. Liability to full-time conscription was enforced on all males between 18 and 41. By 1942, all male British subjects resident in Great Britain aged 18–50 were liable to call-up, with only a few categories exempted, and female subjects aged 20–29.National Service (No 2) Act 1941	
1944	UK Government	In 1939 the government had considered raising school leaving age to 15, but this was delayed by the onset of World War Two. The Education Act succeeded in extending compulsory education to age 15, which took effect from 1947.	
1945	UNESCO	Following dissolution of the League of Nations, the United Nations was founded on 24 October, but had already in 1943 begun operating UNRRA, a relief organization to combat famine and disease in liberated Europe. UNESCO was also established with Julian Huxley as the first Director General, standing at the centre of the post-World War II revival of education. Huxley was a prominent member of the British Eugenics Society, and one of the liberal intellectual elite of the time who believed in birth control and 'voluntary' sterilization for the "virtual elimination of the few lowest and most degenerate types". Huxley's six-year term of office, defined in the Charter, was reduced to two years, and UNESCO's education programme became a collaboration with the International Bureau of Education, of which Jean Piaget was Director from 1929 until 1968. Piaget had declared during the Second World War in 1940: "The common wealth of all civilizations is the education of the child."	
11 December 1946	United Nations General Assembly	The first major step on behalf of children taken by the United Nations, was UNICEF's creation in 1946 co-founded by Maurice Pate and Ludwik Rajchman to provide emergency food and healthcare to children in countries devastated by World War II. Two years later, the Universal Declaration of Human Rights was adopted by the UN General Assembly.	
1947	UK Government	After World War II the National Service Act 1947 and subsequent measures ordained peacetime conscription of all males aged 18 for a set period (originally 1 year, later two years) until National Service ceased in 1960, with final Demobilization in 1963. 1,132,872 men were conscripted after 1945 to serve the British Army on reaching the age of 18. About 125,000 served in an active theatre of operations, and were expected to fight guerrillas or cope with riots or civil war situations with minimal training in such combat situations as Korea, Malaya, Suez and Aden.	
July 1948	UK Government	The War landed more than a million children, evacuated from town centres, on to local councils with inadequate resources to care for them. Many were placed in foster homes and became emotionally disturbed, reacting by bed-wetting, stealing and running away. After the war, children who had no families to return to, became 'nobody's children'. The Children Act 1948 finally brought together responsibility for children without adequate parents, formerly dealt with under the Poor Law, and responsibility for delinquent children in Remand Homes, formerly under the aegis of Local Education Authorities, with the requirement for every County and County Borough to establish a Children's Committee and appoint a Children's Officer. This has been the basis on which social workers have acted on behalf of children ever since. Detention Centres, under the Prison Department of the Home Office, were later introduced for miscreants, designed to administer a "short sharp shock" to older teenagers through drilling, physical jerks, military-style discipline, and cold showers before dawn.	
1950s	Society and media	Teenagers first came to public attention during the war years, when there were fears of juvenile delinquency. By the 1950s, the media presented the teenagers in terms of generational rebellion. The exaggerated moral panic among politicians and the older generation was typically belied by the growth in intergenerational cooperation between parents and children. Many working-class parents, enjoying newfound economic security, eagerly took the opportunity to encourage their teens to enjoy more adventurous lives. Schools were falsely portrayed as dangerous blackboard jungles under the control of rowdy kids. The media distortions of the teens as too affluent, and as promiscuous, delinquent, counter-cultural rebels do not reflect the actual experiences of ordinary young adults, particularly young women,	
20 November 1959	United Nations General Assembly	An expanded version of the Declaration of the Rights of the Child, covering children's rights, maternal protection, health, adequate food, shelter and education, was adopted by the General Assembly in 1959 as a milestone in the commitment of world governments to focus on the needs of children – an issue once considered peripheral to development, but serving as a moral, rather than legally binding framework.	
1967	Court Lees Approved School	The Gibbens report into allegations of excessive punishment at the school prompted Home Secretary Roy Jenkins to announce its immediate closure, and the need to phase out corporal punishment in all approved schools. Under the Children and Young Persons Act 1969 responsibility for approved schools was devolved from the Home Office to local social services authorities, and they were renamed "Community Homes with Education".	
1968	Scotland	Following publication of the Kilbrandon report in 1964, the Social Work (Scotland) Act 1968 (c. 49) set up the Scottish Children's Hearings system and revolutionised juvenile justice in Scotland by removing children in trouble from the criminal courts. The institutional framework for supporting children and families established on the basis of the key recommendations of the report has been largely unchanged since it was introduced in 1971. Changes from the latest review, currently under way in 2008, are planned for implementation from 2010.	
1970	United Kingdom	Having concluded that the historical causes for fixing 21 years as the age of majority were no longer relevant to contemporary society, the Latey Committee's recommendation was accepted, that the age of majority, including voting age, should be reduced to 18 years.	
1972	UK Government	The Children Act 1972 set the minimum school leaving age at 16. After the 1972 Act schools were provided with temporary buildings to house their new final year, known as ROSLA (Raising School Leaving Age) buildings and were delivered to schools as self-assembly packs. Although not designed for long-term use, many schools continued using them.	
1972	Murder of Maxwell Confait	Three boys aged 14, 15 and 18 with a mental age of eight confessed under police questioning to starting the fire that killed the victim. They were convicted of arson, manslaughter and murder. In subsequent developments it became apparent that their confessions were untrue and that they had been extracted by improper police pressure. The case caused a major review of police procedures and of how suspects are treated, particularly children and "the educationally subnormal". After a successful appeal court hearing, the publication of a book, The Confait Confessions by Christopher Price and Jonathan Caplan, and the setting up of two major inquiries, some of the most radical reforms of the prosecution process ever to have taken place were instituted. The Police and Criminal Evidence Act 1984 gave new rights to police suspects and made the tape-recording of police interviews compulsory. The Phillips Commission, which reported in 1981, proposed a national prosecution service, one of whose aims would be to attempt to ensure that prosecution evidence was properly scrutinised, and that weak cases such as the one relating to the murder of Confait would not even reach the courts. The Crown Prosecution Service eventually came into being in 1986.	
1981	1981 Brixton riot	One of the most serious riots in the 20th century fuelled by racial and social discord, brought black and white youth into violent confrontation with thousands of police. Further riots ensued that year throughout Britain. The Scarman Report detailed a loss of confidence and mistrust in the police and their methods of policing after liaison arrangements between police, community and local authority had collapsed. Recommendations for policing reforms were introduced in 1984. However, the 1999 MacPherson Inquiry into teenager Stephen Lawrence's murder, found that Scarman's recommendations had been ignored, and concluded that the Metropolitan Police Service was institutionally racist.	
1984	UK Government	Police and Criminal Evidence Act 1984 Part IV 37(15). A child is defined as under 17 years old. The Act provides for an Appropriate adult to be called to the police station whenever a child has been detained in police custody.	
1985	The Children's Society	The first refuge is opened for runaways. After 20+ years of campaigning, the government in 2008 set out plans to improve work with the estimated 100,000 under-16s who run away from home or care each year.	
1985	House of Lords	Gillick competence ruling in the case Gillick v West Norfolk and Wisbech Area Health Authority, which sought to decide in medical law whether a child is able to consent to his or her own medical treatment, without the need for parental permission or knowledge. A child is defined as 16 years or younger. The ruling, which applies in England and Wales (but not in Scotland), is significant in that it is broader in scope than merely medical consent. It lays down that the authority of parents to make decisions for their minor children is not absolute, but diminishes with the child's evolving maturity; except in situations that are regulated otherwise by statute, the right to make a decision on any particular matter concerning the child shifts from the parent to the child when the child reaches sufficient maturity to be capable of making up his or her own mind on the matter requiring decision.	
1986	Child Migrants Scandal	Social worker Margaret Humphreys' received a letter from a woman in Australia who had been sent on a boat from the UK to a children's home in Australia, age four, and wanted help in tracing her parents in Britain. Humphrey's subsequent research exposed the abuses of private emigration societies operating under the 1891 Custody of Children Act - a key subtext of which was the aim of supplying Commonwealth countries with sufficient "white stock" particularly in relation to Australia. A Department of Health Report shows that at least 150,000 children aged between 3 and 14 were sent to Commonwealth countries, in a programme that did not end until 1967. The children – the majority of whom were already in some form of social or charitable care – were cut off from their families and even falsely informed that they were orphans. Most were sent with the promise of a better life – but the reality was often very different, with many facing abuse and a regime of unpaid labour. A number of organisations, including Fairbridge, Barnardo's, the Salvation Army, the Children's Society and Catholic groups, were involved in sending children abroad.	
1986	Wales, Bryn Estyn	Although Care workers in Clwyd had been convicted of sex abuse as long ago as 1976, with allegations and investigations in Gwynedd in the 1980s, the scandal was only exposed after Alison Taylor, a children's home head in Gwynedd, pressed her concerns at the highest levels. During police investigations into Ms Taylor's concerns in 1986–87, the authorities constructed a "wall of disbelief" from the outset. An inquiry ordered by the Home Secretary in 1996 into quality of care and standards of education, found both to be below acceptable levels in all the homes investigated.	
1989	United Nations General Assembly	The UN Convention on Children's Rights was adopted into international law.	
1989	UK Government	The Children Act 1989 was intended as the main piece of legislation setting out the legal framework for child protection procedures e.g. enquiries and conferences and introduced the notion of parental responsibility. Provisions apply to all children under 18. It was very wide-ranging and covered all paid childcarers outside the parental home for under-8's, adoption and fostering, and aspects of family law including divorce. Although the Act aimed to enshrine consistency with the UNCRC approach that 'the best interests of the child are pre-eminent', UN monitoring committee reports issued in 1995 and 2002 noted that the principle of primary consideration for the best interests of the child was not consistently reflected in legislation and policies affecting children.	
1990/1991	The Pindown Enquiry	Allan Levy QC inquired into a method of discipline used in Staffordshire children's homes in the 1980s. Pindown was named after the notion that it would "pin down the problem" relating to a particular "difficult" child, and involved locking children in "pindown rooms", sometimes for periods of weeks or months. The 2000 Kilgallon report into Northumberland housing for children with special needs revealed that Pindown tactics were employed between 1972 and 1984.	
12 July 1990	Phillip Knight	The 17-year-old died in custody at HM Prison Swansea as a result of self-inflicted injuries. An inquest yielded an open verdict. Knight was the first of 30 children to die in custody since 1990. The inquest into 16-year-old Joseph Scholes' death in custody in March 2002 led the coroner to support the call for a public inquiry.	
1991	United Kingdom	UK ratification of United Nations Convention on the Rights of the Child, with a number of reservations. UNCRC defines a child as under 18 years old, unless an earlier age of majority is recognised by a country's law.	
February 1993	James Bulger	The murder of two-year-old James Bulger, by Jon Venables and Robert Thompson, both aged 10, prompted national debate about the relationship between Childhood and criminality, which led to abolition in 1998 of the distinction with regard to criminal responsibility between young persons aged at least 14 and children aged between 10 and 14.	
June 1994	Fred West	After their children alerted authorities to the West's rape of their daughter, investigations revealed that between 1967 and 1987, Fred and his wife Rosemary tortured, raped and murdered at least 12 girls and young women, whose disappearance had previously gone unnoticed. The case highlighted the inadequacies of the National Missing Persons Bureau and eventually gave rise to the National Policing Improvement Agency established in 2007.	
February 1995	United Nations	The committee responsible for monitoring implementation of UNCRC issued first concluding observations on the UK's progress.	
1990–1996	UK Government	Concerns about children in residential care led to the commissioning of 10 public enquiries between 1990 and 1996, including the Utting report (1991) and the Warner report (1992), which exposed large-scale institutional abuse of children and young people. Sir William Utting CBE was Chief Inspector of Social Services during the period when the worst cases of abuse happened. Asked why safeguarding steps were not taken when he was directly responsible for overseeing Social Services, he replied: "...the crude answer to that question would be ignorance. There were tremendous pressures, I think, on everybody in the system at that time to deny that those of us working in the system and accepted by the community as being 'devoted to the interests of children' were in fact exploiting them and abusing them. So there was a period of ignorance and...denial and then the ...process of the revelation of these awful things that had gone on for a long time."	
1998	UK Government	The Human Rights Act 1998 received Royal Assent, mostly coming into force in 2002.	
January 1998	UK Government	The Public Interest Disclosure Act received Royal Assent, paving the way for whistleblowers of child abuse and other illegal corporate activities to receive support and protection via the industrial tribunal system. Employees such as those in the army, are excluded	
1998	UK Government	The Crime and Disorder Act 1998 abolished the distinction in England and Wales with regard to criminal responsibility between young persons aged at least 14 and children aged between 10 and 14. Hitherto, a child over 10 but under 14 was deemed in law to be doli incapax, i.e. incapable of crime, unless the prosecution could satisfy the court that a particular child was in fact of such maturity, education and social development as to rebut that presumption. (Children under 10 in England and Wales remain doli incapax, as they have been since the minimum age for criminal responsibility was raised from 8 to 10 under the Children and Young Persons Act 1963; power under the Children and Young Persons Act 1969 to raise the minimum age from 10 to 14 has never been implemented. In Scotland the minimum age remains at 8, but the presumption of doli incapax also remains). Describing Youth Courts as the 'secret garden' of the legal system, Home Secretary Jack Straw established the Youth Justice system, with Restorative Justice premised as the key underlying principle for resolving youth crime.	
1999	UK Government	Protection of Children Act 1999 required a list to be kept of persons considered unsuitable to work with children.	
1999	Professor Sir Roy Meadow	In the trial of Sally Clark accused of murdering her two babies at age 11 weeks and 8 weeks, Meadow's testimony as expert witness postulated Munchausen Syndrome by Proxy, or MSbP, convinced that many apparent cot deaths were in fact the result of child abuse brought on by MSbP. Clark's conviction was overturned in 2003, after 3 years of wrongful imprisonment. Throughout the 1990s Meadow had contributed to a number of convictions of (mostly) women whose children had suffered apparent cot deaths and a greater number of parents, whom Meadow suspected of MSbP, had their children forcibly removed and taken into care. Meadow was struck off the medical register, but reinstated in 2006 after an appeal. The Society of Expert Witnesses had commented that the severity of his punishment would cause many professionals to reconsider whether to stand as expert witnesses.	
1999	UK Government	Prime Minister Tony Blair announced the historic aim to end child poverty in a generation. At that time, the UK had the worst child poverty rate in the European Union. The Government set ambitious targets to cut child poverty by a half by 2010, en route to eradicating it by 2020.	
2000	UK Government	The Sexual Offences (Amendment) Act 2000 changed the age of consent for male homosexual sexual activities and defined the offence of Abuse of Trust, generally to protect 16- and 17-year-olds from sexual advances, both homosexual and heterosexual, from those in positions of trust.	
February 2000	Sir Ronald Waterhouse	The report of an inquiry about abuse in Bryn Estyn and other children's homes in North Wales between 1974 and 1990 was released, which included a recommendation for creation of the post of Children's Commissioner to prevent such scandals in the future.	
March 2000	Summerhill School wins Court Case	Defended by the international human rights barrister, Sir Geoffrey Robertson QC, after three days at the Royal Courts of Justice, Summerhill won its right to continue to be based on children's rights. The DfES accepted its demands, expressed in a joint agreement. The agreement was voted on by the children from the school in the court room. This agreement accepted the right of children at Summerhill to control their own learning, and has been used by Home Educators as part of their legal fights with the government. Summerhill is now the most legally protected school in the country with a unique inspection process that is the first to include the voices of children, preceding the newly announced OFSTED plans to take account of students' views. Summerhill is the only school that has direct input into its inspections through legally appointed experts. Its children have continued to lobby for all children to have the rights they have, attending and lobbying at the UN Special Session on the Child (2002) and the UNESCO conference of Education Ministers when a student spoke during the closing ceremony.	
8 September 2000	United Nations	The Millennium Development Declaration was signed by 189 countries, setting the Millennium Development Goals as targets for monitoring progress.	
November 2000	Murder of Damilola Taylor	Research into the backgrounds of four teenagers accused of murdering Damilola Taylor found that some had been excluded from school, all had substantial histories of serious offending and antisocial behaviour, and had come to police attention before they were 10.	

== 21st century ==
Timeline of 21st century events related to Children's Rights in the UK in chronological order
Date	Parties	Event	Image
2001	Wales	Children's Commissioner for Wales was appointed.	
2001	Sarah's Law	Following the abduction and murder of eight-year-old Sarah Payne, the News of the World newspaper spearheaded a controversial campaign for the government to allow controlled access to the Sex Offenders Register, so that parents with young children could know if a child sex-offender was living in their area. The campaign derived from the USA's so-called Megan's Law, operating in honour of murder victim Megan Kanka and allowing publication of a sex offender's photograph and address.	
2002	UK Government	The Care Standards Act reformed the law relating to the inspection and regulation of various care institutions including children's homes, and created the new post of Director of Children's Rights with the power to investigate individual cases.	
October 2002		The UK committee responsible for monitoring the implementation of the UNCRC in the UK issued its second concluding observations on the UK's progress.	
2003	Northern Ireland	The Commissioner for Children and Young People for Northern Ireland was appointed.	
2003	UK Government	The Sexual Offences Act 2003 lowered the age of consent for certain sexual activities from 18 to 16 in England and Wales. Section 45 defines a "child" for the purposes of the Protection of Children Act 1978 as a person under 18 years, rather than under 16 years, of age. Despite a previous "deep lack of understanding" of incidents of abuse in children's homes run by Islington, Margaret Hodge is appointed Children's Minister in June 2003.	
29 January 2003	Victoria Climbie	The Laming report on the murder of Victoria Climbie recommended the creation of the post of Children's Commissioner and generated legislation known as Every Child Matters. A revised Children Act based on Every Child Matters was enacted in 2004.	
December 2003	Sir Michael Bichard	After the murder of Jessica Chapman and Holly Wells, the Bichard report severely criticised the Chief Constable of Humberside Police for ordering the destruction of criminal records of child abusers as required under the Protection of Children Act 1999. A revised registration scheme for people working with children and vulnerable adults was recommended. The report also revealed that investigation into the murders was severely compromised by involvement of some of the police officers in child pornography, or were Operation Ore suspects.	
2004	Zahid Mubarek Inquiry	After a long legal battle by the family, the Law Lords ordered Home Secretary David Blunkett to hold an Inquiry into Zahid's murder. Sentenced to 3 months imprisonment in Feltham Young Offenders' Institution for stealing razors and interfering with a motor vehicle, the 19-year-old was murdered by his cell-mate on the eve of returning home in 2000. The report's findings are a 'devastating indictment' of the prison system, to which teenagers are routinely consigned.	
2004	Scotland	The Scotland's Commissioner for Children and Young People was appointed, with Children's Hearings and the Scottish Children's Reporter Administration as significant components of children's rights in Scotland.	
2005	England	The Children's Commissioner for England was appointed.	
September 2005	United Nations General Assembly	A Special Summit on the Millennium Development Goals reviewed progress since 2000 on the Goals, which included halving the proportion of people living in poverty by 2015.	
November 2005	Ampleforth College	A monk admitted to 20 incidents of child abuse at a leading Catholic boarding school. At least six paedophiles were active for decades following a decision by former Abbot Basil Hume not to call in police during his tenure, which commenced in 1963.	
March 2006	British Army	An independent review commissioned by the Minister for Armed Forces into circumstances surrounding the deaths of four soldiers recruited under the age of 18 at Princess Royal Barracks, Deepcut between 1995 and 2002, concludes that the deaths were self-inflicted, despite a catalogue of allegations of misconduct at the relevant times. The call for a public enquiry is rejected.	
2006	End Child Poverty	Following the Make Poverty History march and Live 8 events, NGOs launch a coalition to secure the Government's 1999 pledge to halve the numbers of children living below the poverty line by 2010 and eliminate child poverty by 2020.	
February 2006	Howard League for Penal Reform	Publication of Lord Carlile's inquiry into the treatment of children in penal custody. The 47 recommendations include: severely restricting physical intervention; stopping the strip searching of children; and an end to prison segregation.	
2007	Jersey	Social Worker Simon Bellwood was dismissed after making a complaint about a "Dickensian" system in a secure home where children as young as 11 were routinely locked up for 24 hours or more, in solitary confinement. Police subsequently commenced investigations at the site of former children's home Haut de la Garenne.	
July 2007	UK Government	The third report on progress is issued to the UN Committee responsible for monitoring implementation of the UNCRC.	
2007	Corporate Manslaughter and Corporate Homicide Act 2007	The Act was extended to apply to prisoners and young offenders killed or injured whilst in custody, with effect from April 2008. From monitoring and analysis of deaths in custody, NGO Inquest propose an independent, overarching standing commission on custodial deaths, with statutory powers to address the breadth of social and political issues that arise when these deaths occur.	
November 2007	Scottish Government	Following publication of the Shaw report "Historical Abuse Systemic Review: Residential Schools and Children's Homes in Scotland 1950 to 1995", the Scottish Government proposed a truth and reconciliation forum for victims of historic abuse. The discussion paper named "Acknowledgement and Accountability" will be published 2008/9.	
9 June 2008	United Kingdom	The Children's Commissioner for Wales, Children's Commissioner for England, Scotland's Commissioner for Children and Young People and the Northern Ireland Commissioner for Children and Young People jointly report to the UN Committee on the Rights of the Child, in preparation for the 30th Anniversary of the International Year of the Child. The remit of individual UK Commissioners differ in the devolved administrations, however the first report by federal Commissioners is unanimous in calling for incorporation of UNCRC into domestic legislation and a ban on police indefinitely keeping children's DNA on record. Amongst 100 recommendations are: increasing the age of criminal responsibility; a reduction in the number of children in custody; and a public inquiry into the deaths of 30 children in custody over the past 10 years. UK's main NGO's including UNICEF and CRAE also attended the Pre Sessional Working Group with the UN Committee. 12 Children and Young People represented England as well.	
November 2008	Death of Baby P	After details of the tragic life and death of the 17-month-old at the hands of his parent and carers, whilst on the 'At Risk' register of Haringey Social Services were revealed, Ofsted confirmed that between April 2007 and August 2008, 282 children died of neglect, abuse or in the care system. Of that total, 72 died in accidents, stabbings or shootings while in foster or residential care, while the remaining 210 died of abuse or neglect at the hands of their families. This means that 12 children are killed by abuse each month.	
16 March 2011	Rights of Children and Young Persons (Wales) Measure 2011	The National Assembly of Wales partially incorporates the UN Convention of the United Nations Convention on the Rights of the Child into domestic law.	
1 May 2012	Protection of Freedoms Act	Part 1, Chapter 2 gives a child the right to prevent their biometric information (e.g. fingerprints) from being collected by an educational establishment and requires the processing of biometric information to be discontinued should the child object at any time. The right of a child to refuse the collection of their biometric information stands regardless of whether parental consent is offered or not. It also requires one parent to provide consent for the processing of biometric data and if any parent is to object to such collection of data the data processing must be discontinued.	
7 November 2020	Children (Equal Protection from Assault) (Scotland) Act 2019	The Scottish Parliament's bans corporal punishment on children commences.	
21 March 2022	Children (Abolition of Defence of Reasonable Punishment) (Wales) Act 2020	The National Assembly of Wales' bans corporal punishment on children commences.	
16 January 2024	United Nations Convention on the Rights of the Child (Incorporation) (Scotland) Act 2024	The Scottish Parliament passes the UN Convention on the Rights of Children into domestic law.	

== See also ==
- Index of children's rights articles
- Index of youth rights–related articles
- List of legislation in the United Kingdom
- Student rights
- Timeline of young people's rights in the United States
- Youth rights
