= Children (Abolition of Defence of Reasonable Punishment) (Wales) Act 2020 =

- Act of the National Assembly for Wales
- National Assembly for Wales
- Long title: An Act of the National Assembly for Wales to abolish the common law defence of reasonable punishment in relation to corporal punishment of a child taking place in Wales; and for connected purposes.
- Citation: 2020 anaw 3
- Introduced by: Julie Morgan AM
- Territorial extent: Wales

Dates
- Royal assent: 20 March 2020
- Commencement: 21 March 2022

Status: Current legislation

History of passage through the Assembly

Text of statute as originally enacted

Text of the Children (Abolition of Defence of Reasonable Punishment) (Wales) Act 2020 as in force today (including any amendments) within the United Kingdom, from legislation.gov.uk.

The Children (Abolition of Defence of Reasonable Punishment) (Wales) Act 2020 (anaw 3) (Welsh: Deddf Plant (Diddymu Amddiffyniad Cosb Resymol) (Cymru) 2020) is an act of the National Assembly for Wales that was given royal assent on 20 March 2020. It was introduced to the Assembly in March 2019 by Julie Morgan AM and passed on the 28 January 2020. It was first detailed in February 2019 by way of an explanatory memorandum.

== Context ==
The bill followed the Scottish Parliament's passage in 2019 of the Children (Equal Protection from Assault) (Scotland) Act 2019, and means people in Wales (as in Scotland) will be banned from smacking their children. The law was last reformed by section 58 of the (England and Wales) Children Act 2004 which had stopped the use of the "reasonable punishment defence" for the charges of actual bodily harm or cruelty to a child.

The Guardian described the bill upon passage as the "first divergence of core criminal law between Wales and England", with the newspaper citing concerns from holidaying English visitors who may now fear prosecution for punishing their children while in Wales. There are no current plans to introduce bans in Northern Ireland or England.

== Commencement ==
The bill was agreed by the Assembly on 28 January 2020. It became an act following royal assent. The law has taken effect on 21 March 2022.

== Legal effect ==
The act abolishes the common law defence of "reasonable punishment" set out in the case of R v Hopley [1860] 2F&F 202.

The act does not introduce a new offence of assault against a child, instead relying on continued prosecution using existing common law offences against the person. As a result, no offences will be charged on the basis of the act; instead, existing prosecutions will be considered without the issue of a "reasonable punishment" defence. The existing Crown Prosecution Service guidance that injuries must exceed "temporary reddening of the skin" will no longer be considered in cases.

== Political debate ==
The deputy social services minister Julie Morgan proposed the new law after years of breaking the Labour whip on the issue. Under former First Minister Carwyn Jones, Labour had previously opposed a ban on smacking, however his successor Mark Drakeford (a former social worker) has been an advocate of reform.

The Labour Party whipped in favour of the nill when brought to a final vote, while the Conservative Party allowed a free vote on the legislation. Conservatives David Melding and Angela Burns both supported the bill, but Janet Finch-Saunders in particular was an opponent. Brexit Party group leader Mark Reckless said "the time was not right to legislate", while Helen Mary Jones of Plaid Cymru praised the decision as closing "an outdated loophole (which) finally gives children in Wales the same legal protection from assault as adults." Brexit Party AM Mandy Jones was vocal in her opposition to the bill. She spoke in the chamber about the physical and emotional abuse she suffered from her adopted mother. Drakeford also commented on the ban stating "I’m proud Wales has taken this step and once again put children’s rights at the heart of what we do here." explaining his view that "Times have changed and there is no place in a modern society for the physical punishment of children."

Supporters of a ban across the UK include the Children's Commissioners for Wales, Scotland, England and Northern Ireland, while opponents have included the Be Reasonable campaign and evangelical Christian groups.

== Impact ==
After researching similar reforms in New Zealand, the Welsh Government expects 38 prosecutions over five years, however the CPS has indicated the real number of prosecutions will be lower. Police figures commented that despite the reform, not all smacking offences reported will be prosecuted, due to the likely use of community resolution orders, cautions, or other warnings by police may be preferred to criminal charges. Cautions and orders could however show up on enhanced Disclosure and Barring Service checks.

== See also ==
- Children First Act 2015
- Children (Equal Protection from Assault) (Scotland) Act 2019
- Child corporal punishment laws
