= Children's Commissioner =

Children's Commissioner is the official or unofficial title of some Children's Ombudsmen, or of the agencies they head. It could refer to:

== Australia ==
- National Children’s Commissioner, Commonwealth
- Children and Young People Commissioner, Australian Capital Territory
- Office of the Children's Commissioner, Northern Territory, Australia
- Office of the Public Guardian, Queensland, Australia
- Commissioner for Children and Young People, South Australia, Australia
- Commissioner for Children and Young People, Tasmania, Australia
- Office of the Child Safety Commissioner, Victoria, Australia
- Commissioner for Children and Young People, Western Australia, Australia

== United Kingdom ==
- Children's Commissioner for England
- Children and Young People's Commissioner Scotland
- Children's Commissioner for Wales
- Northern Ireland Commissioner for Children and Young People

== Other countries ==
- Commissioner for Child Rights, Belgium (French Community)
- The head (commissaris), of the Child Rights Commission, Belgium (Flemish Community))
- Commissioner for Children's Rights, Cyprus
- Children's Commissioner, New Zealand
- Children's Rights Commissioner, Russia

== See also ==
- Standing Committee on Education, Women, Children, Youth and Sports (Parliament of India)
