= Legality of corporal punishment in England and Wales =

In England and formerly in Wales, battery punishment by parents of their minor children is lawful by tradition and explicitly under common law by R v Hopley [1860] 2F&F 202 (the justification of lawful correction):

By the law of England, a parent ... may for the purpose of correcting what is evil in the child inflict moderate and reasonable corporal punishment, always, however, with this condition, that it is moderate and reasonable.

The common law of England and Wales has a general prohibition against physical contact and battery. The Crown Prosecution Service charging standard for offences against the person states "A battery is committed when a person intentionally and recklessly applies unlawful force to another" and defines assault as "when a person intentionally or recklessly causes another to apprehend the immediate infliction of unlawful force".

In reference to any allegation that the battery amounted to a criminal act, Archbold Criminal Pleading Evidence and Practice states (as moderate and reasonable are bilateral synonyms of each other in the English language):

It is a good defence to prove that the alleged battery was merely the correcting of a child by its parents, provided that the correction be moderate in the manner ...

The UK government states those with parental responsibility for a child have a duty to discipline the child in their charge. Parental rights and responsibilities are enshrined in international law through Article 5 of the United Nations Convention on the Rights of the Child (UNCRC), to which the UK is a signatory without reservations:

States Parties shall respect the responsibilities, rights and duties of parents or, where applicable, the members of the extended family or community as provided for by local custom, legal guardians or other persons legally responsible for the child, to provide, in a manner consistent with the evolving capacities of the child, appropriate direction and guidance in the exercise by the child of the rights recognized in the present Convention.

However, the state has an obligation under Article 19 of the UNCRC to protect children:

States Parties shall take all appropriate legislative administrative, social and educational measures to protect the child from all forms of physical or mental violence, injury or abuse, neglect or negligent treatment, maltreatment or exploitation, including sexual abuse, while in the care of parent(s), legal guardian(s) or any other person who has the care of the child.

Such protective measures should, as appropriate, include effective procedures for the establishment of social programmes to provide necessary support for the child and for those who have the care of the child, as well as for other forms of prevention and for identification, reporting, referral, investigation, treatment and follow-up of instances of child maltreatment described heretofore, and, as appropriate, for judicial involvement ...

Until 16 January 2005, 'moderate' was undefined; however implementation of Section 58 of the Children Act 2004 ("CA 2004") set a perceived statutory definition of 'immoderate' as assault occasioning actual bodily harm ("ABH"). CA 2004 was implemented following A v United Kingdom where domestic law allowed a step-father to successfully use the defence of lawful correction after inflicting injuries to his step-son that the European Court had ruled were counter to the child's inalienable rights under Article 3 of the European Convention on Human Rights ("ECHR"). The section provides that reasonable punishment does not justify a battery

- in a criminal case of assault occasioning actual bodily harm, grievous bodily harm (whether with or without intent), child cruelty, or strangulation, or
- in a civil case, where the battery caused actual bodily harm

and repealed the saving in section 1 of the Children and Young Persons Act 1933 that excluded punishment (without the word "reasonable") from the scope of the offence of child cruelty.

By defining 'immoderate chastisement' through its subsections 1 and 2, s. 58 CA 2004 by implication defined 'moderate punishment' as an antonym (and 'reasonable' as a bilateral synonym of 'moderate') as an injury that is less than ABH and therefore only potentially chargeable as the lesser offence of common assault, the sentence for which is given by Section 39 of the Criminal Justice Act 1988. Subsections 3 and 4 provided a statutory definition of 'significant harm' in civil proceedings such as social services investigations under Section 47 of the Children Act 1989 as ABH. Subsection 5 repealed the former statutory defence of lawful punishment under Section 1(7) of the Children and Young Persons Act 1933, removing corporal punishment's legal basis from the primary legislation of England and Wales.

Allied to the introduction of s. 58 CA 2004, the UK government made various press releases informing the public in England and Wales that Act's effects in lay terms, such as the following from The Daily Telegraph:

Parents who smack their children hard enough to leave a mark will face up to five years' imprisonment from today. New laws which came into force at midnight allow mild smacking but criminalise any physical punishment which causes visible bruising. ... A 'reasonable chastisement' defence will still be available to parents but they could be charged with common assault if a smack causes bruises, grazes, scratches, minor swellings or cuts. Child protection charity the NSPCC said the law was flawed and called for a total ban on smacking. NSPCC boss Mary Marsh said: "Hitting a child remains legal – as long as parents do not cause children injury amounting to anything more than transient reddening of the skin. ... This new law is flawed. There is a risk that parents may choose to hit children on parts of their body where injury is less visible, such as the head, which can cause serious harm." The Government suffered a rebellion by 47 Labour MPs who wanted a total ban when the measures were passed in the Children Act last November. Mrs Marsh added: "Parents may find themselves, often in the heat of the moment, trying to decide how hard and where on the body they can hit their children to avoid prosecution for leaving a mark. It should be just as wrong to hit a child as it is to hit an adult." A Department for Education and Skills spokeswoman said: "The Government has sent a clear message to parents that they will not be criminalised for bringing up their children in a supportive disciplinary environment and are able to consider smacking as part of that."

Also contemporary, the CPS made a less public assertion that with child victims of assault, their age could be considered an aggravating factor in deciding upon the charge, presumably to prevent further cases similar to A v UK. This led to interpretations by parties of the UK that any injury more than "transient reddening of the skin" should usually be charged as s. 47 ABH and by this, the police could prosecute or issue a police caution to the parent by disregarding the defence by justification of lawful correction as being not applicable (often giving the caution for the lesser charge of common assault), such as the following in the UK's Review of Section 58 of the Children Act 2004 ("S58 Review"):

Following the change in the law, the Crown Prosecution Service amended the Charging Standard on offences against the person, in particular the section dealing with common assault. The Charging Standard now states that the vulnerability of the victim, such as being a child assaulted by an adult, should be treated as an aggravating factor when deciding the appropriate charge. Injuries that would usually lead to a charge of 'common assault' now should be more appropriately charged as 'assault occasioning actual bodily harm' under section 47 of the Offences against the Person Act 1861 (on which charge the defence of reasonable punishment is not now available), unless the injury amounted to no more than temporary reddening of the skin and the injury is transient and trifling.

The same S58 Review however provides a subtlety different interpretation with a spelling mistake highlighted:

Therefore any injury sustained by a child which is serious enough to warrant a charge of assault occasioning actual bodily harm cannot be considered to be as the result of reasonable punishment. Section 58 and the amended Charging Standard mean that for any injury to a child caused by a parent or person acting in loco parentis which amounts to more than a temporary reddening of the skin, and where the injury is more that [sic] transient and trifling, the defence of reasonable punishment is not available.

This change to the charging standard reached police officers as the following bulletin (obtained via a FOIA request from Humberside Police and operational 2015) transmuting the original CPS assertion in possibility of 'could', through the advisory of 'should' and reaching those operationally responsible for enforcing the law bearing the definitive 'would':

It states that, in respect of adults, an assault which causes injuries such as grazes, scratches, abrasions, minor bruising, swellings, reddening of the skin, superficial cuts, or a 'black eye' would normally be considered common assault. But where the assault is against a child, such injuries (other than 'reddening of the skin') would normally be charged as assault occasioning actual bodily harm.

Precedent of R v Donovan 25 [1934] Cr App R 1 CCA demands that allegations of s. 47 ABH must be supported by evidence of injury that "must, no doubt, be more than merely transient and trifling". The Criminal Justice Act 1988 provides a good reference for 'transient and trifling' as being an injury only chargeable as common assault. S. 47 ABH has always been regarded as a serious offence, warranting a prison sentence of up to five years.

The CPS withdrew the explicit authorisation and clarified its position in 2011. This was communicated to the police by letter from the Association of Chief Police Officers on 16 December 2011 with the following words:

In addressing the likely sentence, prosecutors should consider the Sentencing Council's Definitive Guideline on Assault and to only charge ABH where the sentence is likely to be 'clearly' more than six months.

This approach uses statute and common law precedent in defining the chargeability of s. 47 ABH where injury is no doubt more than 'not serious' or 'transient and trifling' common assault and that offence's sentencing availability of six months (and less than 'really serious' grievous bodily harm with its term between two and ten years). The CPS modified the charging standard as such and clarified the 'mark' that parents are "not allowed to leave" as an injury clearly warranting a prison sentence in excess of six months, after consideration of all circumstances, including in exceptional cases, aggravating factors such as the age of the victim:

The offence of Common Assault carries a maximum penalty of six months’ imprisonment. This will provide the court with adequate sentencing powers in most cases. ABH should generally be charged where the injuries and overall circumstances indicate that the offence merits clearly more than six months' imprisonment and where the prosecution intend to represent that the case is not suitable for summary trial. There may be exceptional cases where the injuries suffered by a victim are not serious and would usually amount to Common Assault but due to the presence of significant aggravating features (alone or in combination), they could more appropriately be charged as ABH contrary to section 47 of the Offences Against the Person Act 1861. This would only be where a sentence clearly in excess of six months' imprisonment ought to be available, having regard to the significant aggravating features.

Following them being made aware of the CPS 2011 withdrawal, the Children Are Unbeatable! alliance stated the following in their bulletin of April 2016:

We do not yet know why these changes to the charging standards were made or who was involved. The CPS told us: "The CPS sought views from interested parties on the charging standards when in draft and the DPP chaired a roundtable that included the magistracy and ACPO (NPCC) [the Association of Chief Police Officers/National Police Chiefs Council] to discuss them. There was general support for the new charging standards. It does not appear that any health, social work or voluntary bodies working in child protection were either consulted or informed of the changes. Certainly there has been no change in advice to professionals: even the Authorised Professional Practice Guidance for the Police on the College of Policing website still refers to the 'reddening of the skin' threshold for the defence of 'reasonable punishment'."

In the S58 Review the UK states:

The law is clear. But there appears to be a lack of understanding about precisely what the law allows and does not allow. The law does not permit anyone deliberately or recklessly to cause injury to a child which is more than transient and trifling. It is important that parents understand the law so that they can bring up their children in the most effective way they see, and not live in unreasonable fear of being subject to criminal investigation. It is important too that practitioners, particularly social workers, understand the law and are honest with parents about its effect, while giving whatever advice and recommendations they think best to help parents bring up their children effectively.

However, when asked what parents are allowed to do in corporal punishment, the UK responded through the Department for Education:

The Department cannot offer definitive advice on the interpretation of the law.

The police forces of England and Wales continue to use the withdrawn assertion of the CPS that minor injuries to children may be charged as ABH many years after being informed of this withdrawal such as the following FOIA response obtained in 2016 from Dyfed–Powys Police:

Section 58 of the Children Act 2004 removes the defence of lawful chastisement for parents or adults acting in loco parentis where the accused person is charged with ABH, Wounding, GBH or Child Cruelty. However lawful chastisement defence remains available for parents and adults acting in loco parentis charged with common assault under Sec 39 of the CJA. CPS charging standards state that if an injury amount to no more than reddening of the skin and the injury is transient and trifling, a charge of common assault may be laid against the defendant for whom the lawful chastisement defence remains available.

The National Assembly for Wales abolished the defence of reasonable punishment in 2022 with the coming into force of section 1 of the Children (Abolition of Defence of Reasonable Punishment) (Wales) Act 2020.
