= Harbor - Silver League =

High school sports league in California

The Harbor - Silver League is a California high school sports league that is part of the CIF Southern Section. The league does not support football.

== Members ==
- Ánimo Leadership Charter High School
- Environmental Charter High School
- Hope Centre Academy
- Zinsmeyer Academy
