= Hansard Society =

British charity promoting parliamentary democracy

Logo

The Hansard Society was formed in the United Kingdom in 1944 to promote parliamentary democracy. Founded and chaired by Commander Stephen King-Hall, the first subscribers were Winston Churchill and Clement Attlee. The society's co-presidents are the Speaker of the House of Commons, Sir Lindsay Hoyle, and the Lord Speaker, Lord McFall of Alcluith, and the vice-presidents are the leaders of the Labour, Conservative and Liberal Democrat parties. The society is named after the Hansard parliamentary record, which publishes the proceedings of the British parliament.

More than 70 years on, the Hansard Society claims to be universally recognised as the independent and non-partisan authority on Parliament and democracy. Their work encompasses a wide range of areas, from citizenship education to the role of Parliament, from devolution to the impact of new media on politics. In addition, the society organises a variety of events in Westminster with high-profile speakers, influential seminars and popular fringe events at party conferences.

== Advisory Council ==
The society has an Advisory Council who support the staff and work of the society in an advisory capacity and across the various programmes of work. It is composed of MPs and Lords, journalists, business people and academics. Within the council there is an executive committee, which acts as a board of trustees. The current chair of the Advisory Council is Peter Riddell.

== Areas of work ==
The Hansard Society functions through a number of project teams, whose work includes:

- providing a platform for debate on current issues around Parliament, constitutional affairs, participation and engagement
- generating wide-reaching recommendations to improve parliamentary and legislative processes through timely and rigorous research
- pushing the boundaries of new technology and its abilities to engage the public with policy makers
- creating and promoting fresh and accessible resources to help teachers present the citizenship curriculum in an innovative and interesting way
- running training sessions for teachers and policy professionals to enable them to understand a range of political issues and processes effectively
- bringing students from across the globe to study the British political system and to gain experience through internships in a wide variety of political organisations

=== Citizenship Education ===
The Citizenship Education programme works with young people through schools and colleges to educate and inform them about parliamentary democracy and develop innovative ways to involve them in participatory democratic activities. It aims to ensure that teachers have free access to knowledge, training sessions and stimulating resources for political education.

The programme organises mock elections in schools across the UK and runs a number of student-focused projects.

=== Digital Democracy ===
Established in 1997, the Digital Democracy programme (until 2010 known as the eDemocracy Programme) was the first research unit dedicated to examining the political and social impact of information and communications technology (ICT). They also conduct research and evaluation; producing commentary and analysis on the latest new media developments and their impact on parliament, government and civil society, including digital participation, engagement, political campaigning and the parliamentary process. The programme was led from 2007 until 2011 by Dr Andy Williamson, a well known researcher and commentator on digital democracy. Previous directors included Ross Ferguson (2005 - 2007) and Professor Stephen Coleman (until 2005).

The Digital Democracy programme, in conjunction with the House of Lords, established the Lords of the Blog website in 2008 to educate, raise awareness and engage with the public on a range of issues regarding the role and business of the House of Lords. Lord Norton, one of the contributors to the blog, was in 2008 described as "a new star of the blogosphere."

The Ministry of Justice commissioned the programme in 2005 to conduct "an independent review of ways in which central government can use information and communication technology (ICT) to enable and enhance public engagement", called Digital Dialogues.

=== Parliament and Government ===
The Parliament & Government programme undertakes research on political and constitutional reform. In recent years, they have worked on the issues of Parliamentary scrutiny and government accountability, political representation, the process of law making, and public engagement.

Working closely with parliamentarians, government, the media and the public to consider a range of issues relevant to parliamentary democracy, the programme has made many influential recommendations for parliamentary reform. The society's publication, The Fiscal Maze: Parliament, Government and Public Money, encouraged the House of Commons Liaison Committee to examine the issue of parliamentary scrutiny of government expenditure, and the research A Year in the Life: From member of public to Member of Parliament was quoted at length by the Modernisation Committee in its inquiry Revitalising the Chamber: the role of the back bench Member.

The programme also publishes an annual Audit of Political Engagement, examining the characteristics and trends in public attitudes to politics.

=== Hansard Scholars programme ===
In 1985 the society, in conjunction with the London School of Economics, established the Hansard Scholars and Hansard Research Scholars programme, which organised study programmes at LSE and internships in Westminster. The programme was suspended in 2021.

== Funding ==
As a registered charity, the Hansard Society relies on funding from individual donations, grants from charitable trusts and foundations, corporate sponsorship, and donations from individual parliamentarians from Westminster and the devolved institutions.

In 2019, the Hansard Society was given a B grade for funding transparency by Who Funds You?

== Selected publications ==
- Parliament, Politics and Law Making: Issues and Developments in the Legislative Process (2004) by A. Brazier (ed), ISBN 978-0-900432-57-6.
- New Politics, New Parliament? A review of parliamentary modernisation since 1997 (2005) by A. Brazier, M. Flinders & D. McHugh, ISBN 978-0-900432-62-0.
- A Year in the Life: From member of public to Member of Parliament (2006) by G. Rosenblatt, ISBN 978-0-900432-58-3.
- The Fiscal Maze: Parliament, Government and Public Money (2006) by A. Brazier & V. Ram, ISBN 978-0-900432-08-8.
- Parliament in the Public Eye 2006: Coming into Focus? (2006) by G. Rosenblatt, ISBN 978-0-900432-43-9.
- Friend or Foe: Lobbying in British democracy (2007) by Dr P. Parvin, ISBN 978-0-900432-63-7.
- An audit of political engagement 4 (2007) by Hansard Society & Electoral Commission.
- No Overall Control? The impact of a 'hung parliament' on British politics (2008) by A. Brazier & S. Kalitowski (eds), ISBN 978-0-900432-29-3.
- Audit of Political Engagement 5 with a special focus on the Constitution (2008) by Hansard Society, ISBN 978-0-900432-34-7.
- Law in the Making: Influence and Change in the Legislative Process (2008) by A. Brazier, S. Kalitowski & G. Rosenblatt with M. Korris, ISBN 978-0-900432-39-2.
- Audit of Political Engagement 6 with a focus on Political Participation and Citizenship (2009) by Hansard Society, ISBN 978-0-900432-44-6.
- Audit of Political Engagement 7 with a focus on MPs and Parliament (2010) by Hansard Society, ISBN 978-0-900432-49-1.
- Making Better Law: Reform of the legislative process from policy to Act (2010) by R. Fox & M. Korris, ISBN 978-0-900432-78-1.
- Audit of Political Engagement 8 with a focus on coalition politics, civic involvement and the Big Society (2011) by Hansard Society, ISBN 978-0-900432-79-8.

The journal Parliamentary Affairs is jointly published by Oxford University Press and the Hansard Society.
