= List of private schools in Long Beach, California =

This is a list of private schools in Long Beach, California.

== Private primary schools ==
- Bethany School - PK-8 - Christian
- Bethany Lutheran School - PK-8 - Lutheran Church
- Holy Innocents Elementary School - K-8 - Roman Catholic
- Lakewood Christian Schools - PK-8 - Christian
- Los Altos Brethren School - PreK, K-6 - Bible Teaching Christian
- Maple Village Waldorf School - Parent/Toddler, PreK, K-8 - Private
- Oakwood Academy - PK-6 - Christian non-denominational
- Our Lady Of Refuge Elementary School - TK-8 - Roman Catholic
- St. Anthony Elementary School PK-8 - Roman Catholic
- St. Athanasius Elementary School - K-8 - Roman Catholic
- St. Barnabas Elementary School - TK-8 - Roman Catholic
- St. Cornelius Elementary School - K-8 - Roman Catholic
- St. Cyprian Elementary School - TK-8 - Roman Catholic
- St. Joseph Elementary School - K-8 - Roman Catholic
- St. Lucy's School - K-8 - Roman Catholic
- St. Maria Goretti Elementary School - K-8 - Roman Catholic
- Success Work College Preparatory Academy K-12- Private
- Westerly School of Long Beach - K-8th Grade - Private

== Private primary and secondary schools ==
- Accelerated Christian Academy - K-12 and Adult Learners - Private - Distance Learning
- Lakewood Christian Schools (Long Beach, California) - PK-12 - Baptist
- Gethsemane Baptist Church School - K-12 - Baptist
- Pacific Baptist School - K-12 - Baptist
- Parkridge Private School - K-12 and Adults - Private - online
- Success Work College Preparatory Academy-K-12- Private
- Zinsmeyer Academy - 6-12 - Private (ChildNet Youth and Family Services)

== Private secondary schools ==
- St. Anthony High School - 9-12 - Roman Catholic
- Success Work College Preparatory Academy
