= Tam Baillie =

Scottish youth worker and policy manager

- Born: 1957 (age 68–69); Lennoxtown, Scotland
- Education: University of Strathclyde
- Occupation: Policy manager

Tam Baillie (born 1957) is a Scottish youth worker and policy manager who served as Scotland's Commissioner for Children and Young People between 2009 and 2017. Baillie was the chair of the organising committee for the 2023 International Play Association Conference in Glasgow.

== Early life and education ==
Baillie was born in 1957 in Lennoxtown, Scotland. He was educated at the Queen Mary Primary, Glasgow; then Linwood High School, and John Neilson High School, Paisley. He graduated from the University of Strathclyde with a BA in psychology.

== Early career ==
In the mid-1970s, Baillie began work in a community library in Ibrox as part of a job creation programme. He later worked with social services in Nottingham and Liverpool, with a role attempting to provide young people with alternatives to custody.

In 1986 he was the manager of "Stopover", a direct access hostel for young people in Glasgow. He managed "The Big Step", a social inclusion project in Glasgow.

== Policy work ==
Baillie worked as the Director of Policy for Barnardo's from 2003 to 2009, having been the assistant director before this.

== Commissioner ==
Bailie's nomination for Scotland's Commissioner for Children and Young People was approved by Scottish Parliament on 22 April 2009, after an interview process which included children and young people as well as Members of the Scottish Parliament. In September 2010, he launched "The Right Blether", a consultation to gather views, ideas and advice from youngsters to inform a national vote in November. Around 74,000 school-age children and young people took part in the national vote. The following year Baillie launched another consultation "A Right Wee Blether" intended to allow very young children to express ideas. A row developed over caricatures of Baillie that had been commissioned at the cost of £4,000 as part of a website redevelopment. There were also internal HR problems at the Commissioner's office when Baillie took over that took several months to deal with. These issues led to multiple enquiries by journalists and politicians under Freedom of Information legislation.

After an initial two-year term, a Scottish Parliamentary Corporate Body panel interviewed Baillie in January 2011 and also gave consideration to letters and to press coverage. On 10 February 2011 he was reappointed for a second term, to serve until May 2017. A further consultation exercise, "A Baby Blether", asking parents to express views on behalf of their children aged up to two years, was launched before Baillie's second term finished.

Government offices
| Preceded by Kathleen Marshall as Scotland's Commissioner for Children and Young People | Children and Young People's Commissioner Scotland; 2009 – 2017 | Succeeded by Bruce Adamson |
