= Rights of Children and Young Persons (Wales) Measure 2011 =

National Assembly for Wales (Remuneration) Measure 2010
- Measure of the National Assembly for Wales
- National Assembly for Wales
- Long title: A Measure of the National Assembly for Wales to make provision for and in connection with giving further effect in Wales to the rights and obligations set out in the United Nations Convention on the Rights of the Child; and for connected purposes.
- Citation: 2011 nawm 2
- Territorial extent: Wales

Dates
- Royal approval: 16 March 2011

Status: Current legislation

History of passage through the Assembly

Text of statute as originally enacted

Text of the Rights of Children and Young Persons (Wales) Measure 2011 as in force today (including any amendments) within the United Kingdom, from legislation.gov.uk.

The Rights of Children and Young Persons (Wales) Measure 2011 (nawm 2) (Welsh: Mesur Hawliau Plant a Phobl Ifanc (Cymru) 2011) is a measure of the National Assembly for Wales that established several provisions with regard to Welsh Ministers complying with the United Nations Convention on the Rights of the Child.

== Function ==
The measure places a duty on Welsh Ministers to comply with the UN Convention, and a duty to promote the convention.

The Welsh Government must now consult children and young people, the Children's Commissioner for Wales and other relevant stakeholders.

The Welsh Government lacks devolution over justice, so the Measure does not apply to legal aid, policing, among other policy areas. Asylum and migration policy is also not devolved, is also not devolved so the Measure also does not apply to policies regarding unaccompanied minors.

The Measure also makes provisions for a children's scheme to ensure compliance with the convention. The Measure also makes provisions for a consultation on applying the measure to people aged 18–24 - the Measure only applies to those younger than 18 at this moment. This consultation did not lead to change, when it did happen, because upon consultation stakeholders indicated that the Convention "will not address these transitional problems and that there are better ways of focusing on the rights of young people aged 18-24years."

== History ==
In 2008 the four children's commissioners of the UK recommended incorporating the Convention into domestic law.

On 18 January 2011, the Welsh Assembly passed Rights of Children and Young Persons (Wales) Measure 2011 partially incorporating the Convention into domestic law. It only applied to devolved matters. It does not give the Convention superiority over policy and so is only a partial implementation.

In 2014, the Welsh Government set up the Children's Rights Scheme to provide the mechanism to ensure that the Welsh Government complies with giving due regard to the convention. In 2021, this was updated.

== See also ==
- Children and Young People (Scotland) Act 2014
- United Nations Convention on the Rights of the Child (Incorporation) (Scotland) Act 2024
- Children Act 1989
- Human Rights Act 1998
- European Convention on Human Rights
- United Nations Convention on the Rights of the Child
- Children's Commissioner for Wales
