= List of measures of the National Assembly for Wales from 2011 =

This is a list of measures of the National Assembly for Wales passed in 2011. Measures of the National Assembly for Wales were enacted by Senedd Cymru (the Welsh Parliament; or simply the Senedd) under its former name of the National Assembly for Wales, as part of its legislative authority over devolved matters in relation to Wales under the authority of the Government of Wales Act 2006. It has no longer been possible for the Senedd to pass measures since 5 May 2011, when it was conferred with the power to pass acts of Senedd Cymru (then known as acts of the National Assembly for Wales) following a referendum, although a minor exemption was granted to any proposed measures which had been passed by the National Assembly but not yet given royal assent at that date. All legislation passed by the Senedd is bilingual, with the English and Welsh texts being equally authoritative. Measures are cited by calendar year, in the same fashion as acts of Parliament of the United Kingdom. Each measure passed in a respective year is numbered consecutively with Arabic numerals, following the prefix "nawm" (or, in Welsh, "mccc").

7 measures of the National Assembly for Wales were passed in 2011.

indicates that a measure has been transcribed on Wikisource, indicates that a measure is available to view at legislation.gov.uk, and indicates the location of the original measure in the National Library of Wales.

== Measures of the National Assembly for Wales ==
Short title	Citation	Royal assent
Long title
Welsh Language (Wales) Measure 2011; Mesur y Gymraeg (Cymru) 2011	2011 nawm 1; 2011 mccc 1	9 February 2011
A Measure of the National Assembly for Wales to make provision about the official status of the Welsh language in Wales; to provide for a Welsh Language Partnership Council; to establish the Office of Welsh Language Commissioner; to provide for an Advisory Panel to the Welsh Language Commissioner; to make provision about promoting and facilitating the use of the Welsh language and treating the Welsh language no less favourably than the English language; to make provision about standards relating to the Welsh language (including duties to comply with those standards, and rights arising from the enforceability of those duties); to make provision about investigation of interference with the freedom to use the Welsh language; to establish a Welsh Language Tribunal; to abolish the Welsh Language Board and Welsh language schemes; and for connected purposes. Mesur gan Gynulliad Cenedlaethol Cymru i wneud darpariaeth ynglŷn â statws swyddogol y Gymraeg yng Nghymru; i ddarparu ar gyfer Cyngor Partneriaeth y Gymraeg; i sefydlu Swydd Comisiynydd y Gymraeg; i ddarparu ar gyfer Panel Cynghori Comisiynydd y Gymraeg; i wneud darpariaeth ynglŷn â hybu a hwyluso defnyddio'r Gymraeg ac ynglŷn â pheidio â thrin y Gymraeg yn llai ffafriol na'r Saesneg; i wneud darpariaeth ynglŷn â safonau'n ymwneud â'r Gymraeg (gan gynnwys dyletswyddau i gydymffurfio â'r safonau hynny, a hawliau sy'n deillio o allu gorfodi'r dyletswyddau hynny); i wneud darpariaeth ynglŷn ag ymchwilio i ymyrraeth â'r rhyddid i ddefnyddio'r Gymraeg; i sefydlu Tribiwnlys y Gymraeg; i ddiddymu Bwrdd yr Iaith Gymraeg a chynlluniau iaith Gymraeg; ac at ddibenion cysylltiedig.
Rights of Children and Young Persons (Wales) Measure 2011; Mesur Hawliau Plant a Phobl Ifanc (Cymru) 2011	2011 nawm 2; 2011 mccc 2	16 March 2011
A Measure of the National Assembly for Wales to make provision for and in connection with giving further effect in Wales to the rights and obligations set out in the United Nations Convention on the Rights of the Child; (Note: Convention on the Rights of the Child) and for connected purposes. Mesur gan Gynulliad Cenedlaethol Cymru i wneud darpariaeth ynghylch ac mewn cysylltiad â rhoi effaith bellach yng Nghymru i'r hawliau a'r rhwymedigaethau a roddir yng Nghonfensiwn y Cenhedloedd Unedig ar Hawliau'r Plentyn; ac at ddibenion cysylltiedig.
Domestic Fire Safety (Wales) Measure 2011; Mesur Diogelwch Tân Domestig (Cymru) 2011	2011 nawm 3; 2011 mccc 3	7 April 2011
A Measure of the National Assembly for Wales to require the provision of automatic fire suppression systems in new residential premises in Wales. Mesur gan Gynulliad Cenedlaethol Cymru i'w gwneud yn ofynnol i ddarparu systemau llethu tân awtomatig mewn mangreoedd preswyl newydd yng Nghymru.
Local Government (Wales) Measure 2011; Mesur Llywodraeth Leol (Cymru) 2011	2011 nawm 4; 2011 mccc 4	10 May 2011
A Measure of the National Assembly for Wales to make provision for and in connection with the promotion of, and support for, membership of county and county borough councils; the provision of staff and other resources by county and county borough councils in connection with the councils' democratic services; family absence for members of county and county borough councils; governance arrangements of county and county borough councils; the discharge of functions of county and county borough councils by committees and members; overview and scrutiny committees of county and county borough councils; audit committees of county and county borough councils; communities and community councils; pensions and other payments for members of county and county borough councils, community councils, National Park authorities, and fire and rescue authorities; collaboration in local government; and for connected purposes. Mesur gan Gynulliad Cenedlaethol Cymru i wneud darpariaeth ar gyfer ac mewn cysylltiad â hybu aelodaeth a rhoi cymorth i aelodaeth cynghorau sir a chynghorau bwrteistref sirol; darparu staff ac adnoddau eraill gan gynghorau sir a chynghorau bwrteistref sirol mewn cysylltiad â gwasanaethau democrataidd y cynghorau; absenoldeb teuluol i aelodau o gynghorau sir a chynghorau bwrteistref sirol; trefniadau llywodraethu cynghorau sir a chynghorau bwrteistref sirol; cyflawni swyddogaethau cynghorau sir a chynghorau bwrteistref sirol gan bwyllgorau a chan aelodau; pwyllgorau trosolwg a chraffu cynghorau sir a chynghorau bwrteistref sirol; pwyllgorau archwilio cynghorau sir a chynghorau bwrteistref sirol; cymunedau a chynghorau cymuned; pensiynau a thaliadau eraill i aelodau o gynghorau sir a chynghorau bwrteistref sirol, cynghorau cymuned, awdurdodau Parciau Cenedlaethol, ac awdurdodau tân ac achub; cydlafurio mewn llywodraeth leol; ac at ddibenion cysylltiedig.
Housing (Wales) Measure 2011; Mesur Tai (Cymru) 2011	2011 nawm 5; 2011 mccc 5	10 May 2011
A Measure of the National Assembly for Wales to make provision for the suspension of the right to buy under the Housing Act 1985 (Note: Housing Act 1985 (c. 68)) and related rights; to make further provision about the regulation of registered social landlords and the enforcement action that may be taken against them; to make further provision as regards the insolvency of registered social landlords; and for connected purposes. Mesur Cynulliad Cenedlaethol Cymru i wneud darpariaeth ar gyfer atal dros dro yr hawl i brynu o dan Ddeddf Tai 1985 a hawliau cysylltiedig, i wneud darpariaeth bellach ynghylch rheoleiddio landlordiaid cymdeithasol cofrestredig a'r camau gorfodi y caniateir eu cymryd yn eu herbyn, i wneud darpariaeth bellach ynghylch ansolfedd landlordiaid cymdeithasol cofrestredig, ac at ddibenion cysylltiedig.
Safety on Learner Transport (Wales) Measure 2011; Mesur Diogelwch ar Gludiant i Ddysgwyr (Cymru) 2011	2011 nawm 6; 2011 mccc 6	10 May 2011
A Measure of the National Assembly for Wales to make provision about safety on transport provided or otherwise secured by local authorities or governing bodies of maintained schools for the purpose of ensuring the attendance of children at places where they receive education or training; and for connected purposes. Mesur gan Gynulliad Cenedlaethol Cymru i ddarparu am ddiogelwch ar gludiant a ddarperir neu a sicrheir fel arall gan awdurdodau lleol neu gyrff llywodraethu ysgolion a gynhelir at ddibenion sicrhau bod plant yn mynychu mannau lle y cânt eu haddysgu neu eu hyfforddi; ac at ddibenion cysylltiedig.
Education (Wales) Measure 2011; Mesur Addysg (Cymru) 2011	2011 nawm 7; 2011 mccc 7	10 May 2011
A Measure of the National Assembly for Wales to make provision for collaboration between local authorities, governing bodies of maintained schools and further education institutions; to make provision for the federation of maintained schools, the training of governors and clerks to governing bodies of maintained schools and the provision of such clerks; to make provision prohibiting new foundation schools; and for connected purposes. Mesur gan Gynulliad Cenedlaethol Cymru i wneud darpariaeth ar gyfer cydlafurio rhwng awdurdodau lleol, cyrff llywodraethu ysgolion a gynhelir a sefydliadau addysg bellach; gwneud darpariaeth ar gyfer ffedereiddio ysgolion a gynhelir, hyfforddi llywodraethwyr a chlercod cyrff llywodraethu ysgolion a gynhelir a darparu'r cyfryw glercod; gwneud darpariaeth sy'n gwahardd ysgolion sefydledig newydd; ac at ddibenion cysylltiedig.
