= Kathleen Marshall (solicitor) =

British solicitor and legal scholar (born 1953)

Kathleen Anne Marshall (born 4 June 1953) is a British solicitor and legal scholar, specialising in child law. From 1989 to 1994, she was director of the Scottish Child Law Centre. From 2004 to 2009, she was Scotland's Commissioner for Children and Young People. She has been involved in a number of inquiries into child abuse: she chaired the Edinburgh Inquiry into Abuse and Protection of Children in Care (report produced in 1999) and she chaired the Independent Inquiry into Child Sexual Exploitation in Northern Ireland (report produced in 2014).

== Early life and education ==
Marshall was born on 4 June 1953. She studied law at the University of Glasgow, graduating with a Bachelor of Laws (LLB) degree in 1973.

== Career ==
After graduating from university in 1973, Marshall became a legal apprentice. After qualifying as a solicitor, she worked for the Glasgow Corporation (IE Glasgow City Council) and then for Glasgow DC. She then took a break from her career to have children, and was a full-time mother between 1977 and 1989.

In 2004 she became the Children and Young People's Commissioner Scotland. In September 2008, she announced that she would not be seeking reappointment.

== Selected works ==
- Marshall, Kathleen (1997). Children's rights in the balance: the participation-protection debate. Edinburgh: Stationery Office. ISBN 0114958521.
- Marshall, Kathleen; Parvis, Paul (2004). Honouring children: the human rights of the child in Christian perspective. Edinburgh: Saint Andrew Press. ISBN 0715208101.

Government offices
| New office | Scotland's Commissioner for Children and Young People; 2004 — 2009 | Succeeded by Tam Baillie |
