= Marietta Farrell =

Irish politician (born 1951)

Member of the Northern Ireland Assembly for Lagan Valley
- In office 9 January 2007 – 7 March 2007
- Preceded by: Patricia Lewsley
- Succeeded by: Paul Butler

Personal details
- Born: 26 October 1951 (age 74) County Sligo, Ireland
- Party: Social Democratic and Labour Party

Marietta Farrell (born 26 October 1951) is an Irish Social Democratic and Labour Party (SDLP) politician who was a Member of the Northern Ireland Assembly (MLA) for Lagan Valley between January and March 2007.

== Background ==
Born in County Sligo, Farrell studied in London and Northern Ireland before becoming a teacher and joining the SDLP. A former member of BBC Northern Ireland Education Committee and the Northern Ireland Youth Council, she stood unsuccessfully for the Westminster seat of North Down at the 1997 and 2001 general elections.

When SDLP MLA Patricia Lewsley resigned from the Northern Ireland Assembly, Farrell replaced her, her appointment being ratified on 9 January 2007. She stood for Lewsley's former Lagan Valley seat at the 2007 election, but was unsuccessful, with Sinn Féin's Paul Butler winning the seat.

Northern Ireland Assembly
Preceded by Patricia Lewsley	MLA for Lagan Valley; January 2007 – March 2007	Succeeded by Paul Butler
