= International Play Association =

The International Play Association (IPA) is an international, non-governmental organization founded in Copenhagen, Denmark in 1961, with an original emphasis on adventure playgrounds. The organization gradually changed its focus to play and children's right to play. Its purpose is to protect, preserve and promote children's right to play as a fundamental human right, according to the Article 31 of the United Nations Convention on the Rights of the Child.

IPA has members in close to 50 countries.

At the IPA Malta Consultation, November 1977, the Declaration of the Child’s Right to Play was produced. It was revised by the IPA International Council in Vienna, September 1982, and Barcelona, September 1989.

IPA published a report in 2005 stating that children in the United Kingdom were suffering from "play malnourishment".

Janet Dalglish MBE, one of the founders of IPA, received London Play's first Lifetime in Play in London Award in 2006.
