= Peter Clarke (social worker) =

Welsh activist

- Born: 7 October 1948; Llandudno, Wales
- Died: 21 January 2007 (aged 58)
- Occupation: Social worker
- Known for: Prominent child welfare activist in Wales

Peter Clarke (7 October 1948 – 21 January 2007) was a prominent child welfare activist in Wales.

Clarke was born in Llandudno. His early life included military training at Sandhurst, from which he moved on to social work in London and Brighton, studying philosophy (BA & MA) at Sussex University.

Clarke worked first at the Stamford House Remand Home in London. In 1985 he became community care advisor for the Spastics Society (now named Scope). From 1991 he was a director of the National Schizophrenia Fellowship, and from 1995 a director of Childline Cymru and worked for many voluntary organisations.

== Children's Commissioner for Wales ==
Clarke is most well known for his work as Children's Commissioner for Wales, a post created in 2001 following the North Wales child abuse scandal report from by Ronald Waterhouse (judge).

In March 2002 Clarke led the Clywch inquiry, which investigated failings made by adults in authority surrounding allegations of abuse by John Owen at Ysgol Gyfun. Owen taught drama at the school from 1974 to 1991, before resigning over allegations of abuse. In 2001 Owen was arrested and charged with criminal offences against children. He was found dead on the 4th of October 2001 after committing suicide. He was due to appear in court the next day.

In 2004 Clarke published the Clywch report, sharing the results of the inquiry and 31 recommendations for the local education authorities and school governing bodies.

In 2003 he headed the social services report, Telling Concerns. Clarke called for local authorities to provide specialist children's complaint officers, whistleblowing policies for staff in social services, and recommendations that a failure to report malpractice should be made a disciplinary offence.

Clarke held this post until his death at age 58 from cancer.
