= How Voters Feel =

2013 book by Stephen Coleman

- Author: Stephen Coleman
- Language: English
- Subject: Political Communication
- Genre: Politics
- Published: April 2013
- Publisher: Cambridge University Press
- Publication place: United Kingdom
- Pages: 280
- ISBN: 9781107014602

How Voters Feel is a 2013 book by Stephen Coleman, Professor of Political Communication at the University of Leeds.

== About ==
The book examines hidden genealogies of democracy, and particularly its most widely recognized act: voting. The book offers insight into the feeling of being a citizen of a democracy. The book is based upon in-depth research involving sixty interviews with voters and non-voters.
