= CRY America =

Children's rights organization

Child Rights and You America
- Location(s): P.O. Box 850948; Braintree, Massachusetts 02185-0948
- Website: http://www.america.cry.org

Child Rights and You America Inc. (formerly Child Relief and You) is an independent, non-religious, non-political, 501(c)(3) registered non-profit organization in the United States. It works to restore basic rights to underprivileged children, especially from India. It is affiliated with Child Rights and You, a non-profit organization in India. CRY focuses mainly on four basic rights which were defined by the United Nations Convention on the Rights of the Child (CRC), an international human rights treaty. The treaty has been ratified by 192 countries, including India.

The CRC is built on certain foundation principles that underpin all children's rights. The CRC confers without discrimination the following basic rights on all children across the world:

- The right to health, nutrition, and name and nationality
- The right to develop through education, care, leisure, and recreation
- The right to be protected from exploitation, abuse, or neglect
- The right to express thoughts, receive and give information, and practice religion

CRY America works to ensure these rights to all underprivileged children, who could be street children, children bonded in labor, children of commercial sex workers, physically and mentally challenged children, or children in juvenile institutions.

The San Francisco Bay Area Action Center and the Connecticut Action Center are just two representative centers out of many CRY America action centers throughout the United States.

The Bay Area Action Center raises funds and awareness through events, such as, CRY Walk 2007, Dhamaka - a musical song and dance event and the Holiday Donation Drive 2007.

The Connecticut Action Center raises funds and awareness through events, such as, the upcoming event, "INDIAN OCEAN" Concert 2008.

The Detroit Action Center is actively involved in fund raising and local community challenges prevail in the Detroit area.

== Projects ==
CRY America's role is not limited to funding. Drawing on the management services of CRY, their partner in India, CRY America attempts to ensure optimal utilization of funds for the enhancement and quality of the supported initiative.

Project name	State	Country	Grant Amount
Boys and Girls Clubs of America	All 50 States	United States	35,000
Children Welfare Society (CWS)	Uttar Pradesh	India	33,737
Collective Action for Rural Development (CAFORD)	Andhra Pradesh	India	34,437
Disha	Odisha	India	16,695
Don Bosco Anbu Illam Social Service Society	Tamil Nadu	India	19,725
JAGRUTHI (Tsunami Support)	Andhra Pradesh	India	14,489
Kalapandhari Magasvargiya & Adivasi Gramin Vikas	Maharashtra	India	51,044
Mahan Seva Sansthan	Rajasthan	India	22,986
Mahila Mandal Barmer Agor (MMBA)	Rajasthan	India	8,599
PARYAVARAN CHETNA KENDRA (PCK)	Jharkhand	India	17,285
SATHEE - Society for Advancement in Tribes, Health, Education, Environment	Jharkhand	India	17,853
Save the Children (Hurricane Katrina Support)	3 States	United States	20,000
Shramika Vikas Kendram (SVK)	Andhra Pradesh	India	25,280
Society for Help Entire Lower and Rural People (Tsunami Support)	Andhra Pradesh	India	16,044
SPREAD - Society for Promotion of Rural Education and Development	Odisha	India	13,869
The Community Services Guild (Tsunami Support)	Tamil Nadu	India	50,969
Vatsalya	Rajasthan	India	22,594
Vikramshila Education Resource Society (VERS)	West Bengal	India	60,000
Youth Council for Development Alternatives (YCDA)	Odisha	India	23,056
CRY (Grant Management Services for 9 projects in India)			34,819
CRY (Tsunami Grant Management Services)			8,133
