= Nigel Williams (children's rights activist) =

British children's rights activist

Northern Ireland Commissioner for Children and Young People
- In office October 1, 2003 – 28 March 2006
- Succeeded by: Patricia Lewsley

Nigel Williams (died March 2006) was a British children's rights activist, known for his engagement against child abuse on the internet. In 1995, he founded the Childnet International. In 2003, he was appointed as the first Northern Ireland Commissioner for Children and Young People, a position he held until his death.

== Internet child abuse countermeasures ==
In 1995, Williams founded and became the first CEO of Childnet International, a position he held until July 2003. Under his leadership, Childnet took the initiative to found the INHOPE association. He has also served on the boards of the Internet Watch Foundation and the Internet Content Rating Association.

== Children's commissioner ==
In 2003, Williams became the first Commissioner for children and young people in Northern Ireland. In spite of illness, he continued to uphold this position until his death in 2006.

== Honours ==
In January 2006, just a few months before his demise, Williams was awarded the "IFIP-WG9.2 Namur Award", which was "to be accorded for an outstanding contribution with international impact to the awareness of social implications of information technology", for his work on keeping children safe".
