= Sally Holland =

Scottish social activist

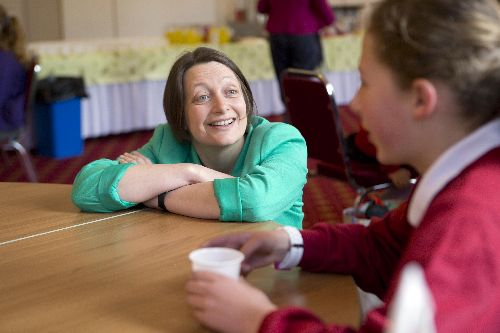
- Holland in November 2015

Children's Commissioner for Wales
- In office 2015–2022
- Preceded by: Keith Towler
- Succeeded by: Rocío Cifuentes

Personal details
- Education: Cardiff University

Sally Holland is a registered social worker, researcher, and teacher, who was the Children's Commissioner for Wales 2015–2022.

== Early life ==
Holland was born in Scotland.

She moved to Wales in 1992 and became an academic at Cardiff University. Her early career also included work as a registered social worker and she has experience in the statutory and voluntary sectors.

== Background ==
Holland worked as a Professor at the School of Social Sciences at Cardiff University, and established the Children's Social Care Research and Development Centre (CASCADE) at Cardiff as its director until taking up the role as Children's Commissioner. She has learned Welsh since moving to Wales.

== Children's Commissioner ==
Holland was appointed as the next Children's Commissioner for Wales in January 2015, and took up the role in April 2015. There was some controversy around the process through which Holland came to become Commissioner, after the Welsh Government initially interviewed for the role and was initially unable to appoint a suitable candidate from the shortlist. The Government was also criticised for failing to make Welsh language skills a desirable requirement for the role. She succeeded incumbent Commissioner Keith Towler, who stepped down after seven years.

== Views ==
Prof Holland is a campaigner for a ban on smacking children and a member of the pressure group Academics for Equal Protection.
