= Children (Equal Protection from Assault) (Scotland) Act 2019 =

Act of the Scottish Parliament

Children (Equal Protection from assault) (Scotland) Act 2019
- Act of the Scottish Parliament
- Scottish Parliament
- Long title: An Act of the Scottish Parliament to abolish the defence of reasonable chastisement; and for connected purposes.
- Citation: 2019 asp 16
- Introduced by: John Finnie MSP
- Territorial extent: Scotland

Dates
- Royal assent: 7 November 2019
- Commencement: 8 November 2019; 7 November 2020

Status: Current legislation

Text of statute as originally enacted

Text of the Children (Equal Protection from Assault) (Scotland) Act 2019 as in force today (including any amendments) within the United Kingdom, from legislation.gov.uk.

The Children (Equal Protection from assault) (Scotland) Act 2019 (asp 3) is an act of the Scottish Parliament that outlaws the use of corporal punishment on children.

== Legal effect ==
Before the act's passage all physical attacks on adults could be treated as assault under Scots Law, however, a person accused of assaulting a child could claim the defence of "reasonable chastisement" or "justifiable assault" when they had used physical force as a form of discipline on an individual under the age of 16. The act abolishes this defence, meaning parents and carers could face prosecution for any use of physical punishment on children.

== Political debate ==
The bill was lodged by the Scottish Green MSP John Finnie who argued that it would "send a strong message that violence is never acceptable in any setting". The bill was supported by the Scottish Greens, the Scottish National Party, the Labour Party and the Liberal Democrats. Outside of politics, the act was praised by the Children and Young People's Commissioner for Scotland and various children's charities.

The bill was opposed by the Conservatives with higher education spokesperson in the Scottish Parliament, Oliver Mundell arguing that “These concerns about criminalisation have been dismissed throughout the passage of this bill but the truth is no one here can guarantee how this bill will be implemented and interpreted by the police, prosecutors or our courts.”

== Timeline ==
The ban was passed by the Scottish Parliament on 3 October 2019 and came into force on 7 November 2020. At the time of its introduction, Scotland was the only part of the UK to have entirely outlawed all use of corporal punishment on minors but a similar law came into force in Wales in 2022.

== See also ==
- Children First Act 2015
- Children (Abolition of Defence of Reasonable Punishment) (Wales) Act 2020
- Child corporal punishment laws
