= Koulla Yiasouma =

Northern Irish public servant

Northern Ireland Commissioner for Children and Young People
- In office 2015–2023
- Preceded by: Patricia Lewsley

Koulla Yiasouma was the Northern Ireland Commissioner for Children and Young People. She took up the post in January or March 2015, and ended her term on March 1, 2023.

== Private life ==
Koulla is of Greek Cypriot origin, and is married. She has a couple of daughters.

== Education ==
In 2015 Yiasouma called for an integrated education system in Northern Ireland.

== Report on 'reasonable chastisement' defence ==
Research carried out by Yiasouma, involving a survey by Kantar Millward Brown showed that 67% of adults in Northern Ireland were unaware of law permitting parents to physically discipline their children but that 63% of those asked supported changing the law. She said "Removing the defence of reasonable chastisement would allow Northern Ireland to join with 52 countries around the world which have moved to protect children from violence. Evidence suggests that protecting children has not led to increased prosecutions as feared by some. Rather, equal protection for children in the law should result in clearer guidance and better support for parents and families."

== Comments on 2021 riots ==
Yiasouma spoke to Broadcasting House about the 2021 Northern Ireland riots saying that the behaviour of some adults in contributing to the actions of young people during the riots involved "coercion by adults of vulnerable and at-risk children". When asked if it amounted to child abuse she said "'Child abuse' is a very loaded term but I think it is within that safeguarding family of abuses children may suffer and experience. When it comes to safeguarding issues I would put it in that group, yes.". She also said "Enough is enough when the first petrol bomb or stone is thrown," and "It's criminal actors trying to take control and what we need is a calm narrative from our politicians. We need them to be seen, to be supporting our community workers on the ground."
