= Rocío Cifuentes =

Children's Commissioner for Wales

Rocío Cifuentes MBE
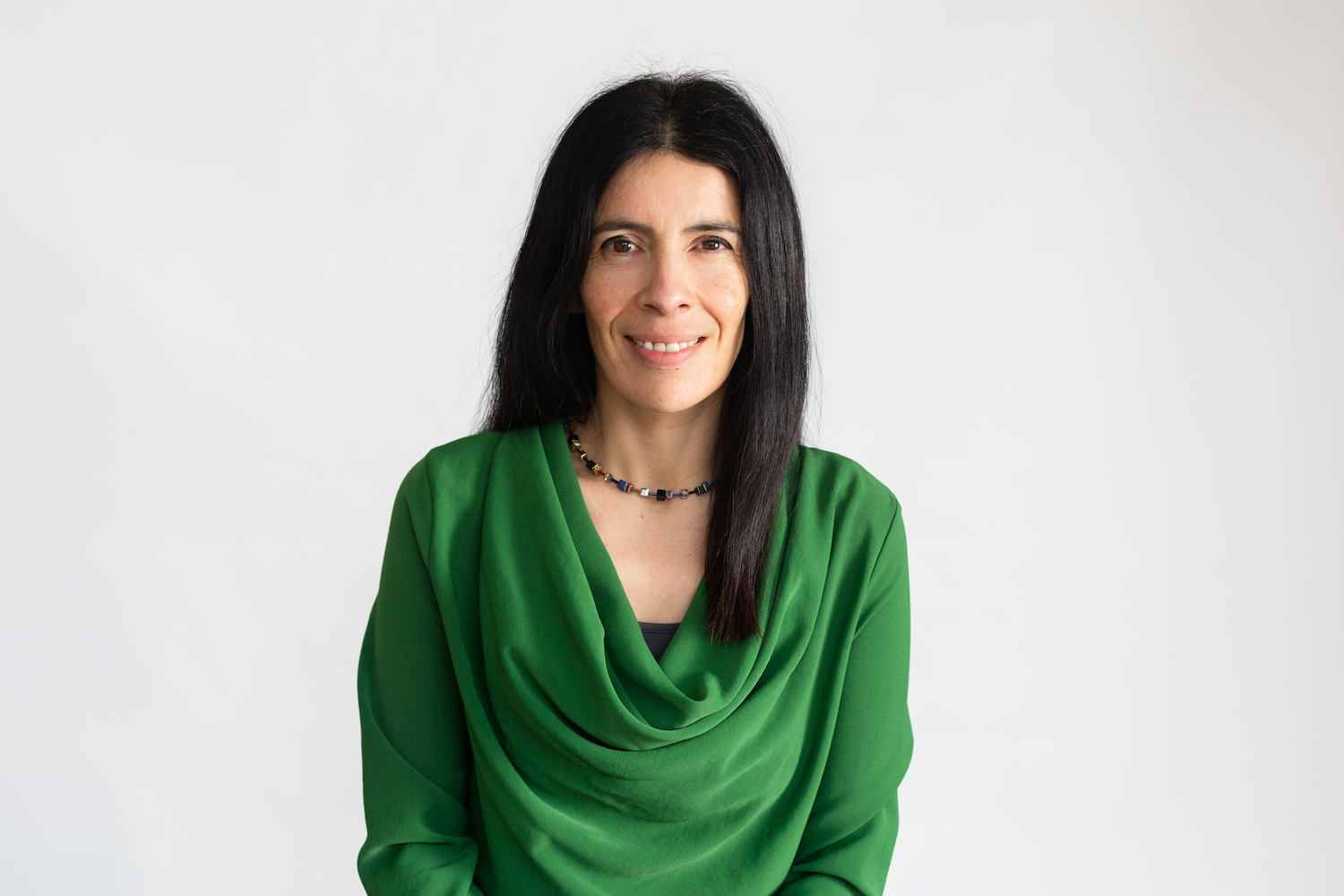
- Cifuentes in 2022

Children's Commissioner for Wales
- Incumbent
- Assumed office 2022
- Preceded by: Sally Holland

Personal details
- Born: c. 1976
- Education: University of Cambridge; University of Swansea

Rocio Cifuentes MBE is a Welsh academic, serving as the Children's Commissioner for Wales since 2022. Born to political dissidents in Chile under the dictatorship of Pinochet, Cifuentes spent her childhood years as a refugee in Swansea. After studying at Cambridge and Swansea universities, she worked in social work, charity and academia. In 2022, she was appointed as Children's Commissioner for Wales by Mark Drakeford.

== Early life and education ==
Rocio Cifuentes was born in Chile during the military dictatorship of General Pinochet. Her parents had been student activists attempting to help the poor under a previous left-wing government. Her father later wrote that he was imprisoned and tortured by the regime. In 1977, when Cifuentes was 13 months old, the family fled to the UK fearing for their safety and settled in Swansea. She has said about her childhood that "There was at the time a larger Chilean community in Swansea where I grew up, so it [the experience of the Pinochet dictatorship] was around me and it certainly shaped my values and who I am."

Cifuentes studied Social and Political Sciences at Cambridge University and later obtained a Master's degree in Social research from Swansea University.

== Career ==
Cifuentes was chief executive of the Ethnic Minorities and Youth Support Team (EYST), a Welsh organisation supporting ethnic minorities, for seventeen years prior to becoming Wales' children's commissioner. She had also previously worked for the Council of Ethnic Minority Voluntary Organisations, Swansea Young Single Homelessness Project, Gower College and Swansea University.

== Children's Commissioner for Wales ==
In January 2022, Welsh First Minister Mark Drakeford announced that Cifuentes would become the Children's Commissioner for Wales at the end of her predecessor Sally Holland's tenure. She was recommended for the role of Wales' children commissioner by a cross-party committee of MS's and took up the role in April 2022. She said in an interview shortly before starting that the COVID-19 pandemic's impact on children and young people would be one of her focus'. She was given an MBE at the Queen's Birthday Honours in 2022.
