= Stephen Coleman (professor) =

Stephen Coleman is Emeritus Professor of Political communication at the University of Leeds. He was born in 1957. He is the author or editor of ten books and over a hundred articles on politics and communication. He is an advocate of direct representation via the Internet. He has been described as a "leading commentator" on online democracy. He has led independent evaluations of the UK televised election debates since 2010 and has worked with the UK Health Security Agency to understand how different segments of the population respond to pandemic guidance in specific ways. He was a member of the Commission on the Future of Oracy Education in England.

Career summary includes:

- New York University, Lecturer in Politics, London campus (1984-1994)
- Hansard Society, Director of Research (1995-2002)
- London School of Economics, Lecturer in Media (1997-2002)
- Oxford Internet Institute, Visiting Professor in E-Democracy (2002-2006)
- University of Leeds, Professor of Political Communication (2006–present).

== iRights research ==
Coleman has conducted research into how young people form opinions about their online experiences. Supported by a group of actors, Coleman worked with the iRights juries drawn from Nottingham, Leeds and London, with whom different scenarios were acted out. These juries each consisted of about 12 young people aged 12–17 from mixed socio-economic backgrounds.

== Books ==
- Coleman, S. (2026) ‘Shaping Citizenship Through Talk Radio: Listening to the 2024 UK General Election’, Bristol: Intellect Books
- Coleman S.(2020) How People Talk About Politics: Brexit and After, London: Bloomsbury Press
- Coleman S (2017) Can the Internet Strengthen Democracy. Cambridge: Polity Press
- Coleman S (2013) How Voters Feel. New York; Cambridge: Cambridge University Press.
- Coleman S (2010) Leaders in the Living Room - the Prime Ministerial Debates of 2010: Evidence, Evaluation and Some Recommendations. Oxford: Reuters Institute for the Study of Journalism.
- Coleman S; Ross K (2010) The Media and the Public: Them and Us in Media Discourse. Oxford: Blackwell-Wiley.
- Coleman S; Coleman S; Morrison DE (2009) Public Trust in the News. Oxford: Reuters Institute for the Study of Journalism.
- Coleman S; Coleman S; Blumler JG (2009) The Internet and Democratic Citizenship: Theory, Practice and Policy. NY: Cambridge University Press.
- Coleman S (2003) The E-Connected World: Opportunities and Risks. McGill University Press.
- Coleman S (1997) Stilled Tongues: from soapbox to soundbite. Porcupine Press.
