= Patricia Lewsley =

Irish politician (born 1957)

Patricia Lewsley CBE

Northern Ireland Commissioner for Children and Young People
- In office 2007–2014
- Preceded by: Nigel Williams
- Succeeded by: Koulla Yiasouma

Member of the Northern Ireland Assembly for Lagan Valley
- In office 25 June 1998 – 19 December 2006
- Preceded by: New Creation
- Succeeded by: Marietta Farrell

Personal details
- Born: 3 March 1957 (age 69) Belfast, County Down, Northern Ireland
- Party: Social Democratic and Labour Party
- Website: http://www.niccy.org

Patricia Lewsley-Mooney CBE (born 3 March 1957) is an Irish former politician who was the Northern Ireland Commissioner for Children and Young People from 2007 to 2014. She was previously a Social Democratic and Labour Party (SDLP) Member of the Northern Ireland Assembly (MLA) for Lagan Valley from 1998 to 2006.

== Background ==
Born in Belfast, Lewsley attended the University of Ulster before working as a cook and an advice worker. She is married with five children, ten grandchildren and two great-grandchildren.

== Political career ==
She stood unsuccessfully for the Social Democratic and Labour Party (SDLP) at the 1997 local elections in Belfast.

In 1998, she was elected to the Northern Ireland Assembly representing the Social Democratic and Labour Party in Lagan Valley, a seat she held in 2003. During her time as an MLA she chaired All-Party Assembly Groups on Children and Young People, Disability, Diabetes, Anti-Poverty, and Ethnic minorities. On the day the Assembly was suspended in 2002, she had been due to introduce a Private Members Bill to strengthen child protection arrangements in Northern Ireland, by placing Area Child Protection Committees on a statutory footing.

In 2001, she was elected to Lisburn City Council. She was a co-founder of Shopmobility in Belfast and initiated the appointment of the only Disability/Equal Opportunity Officer in local government.

On 19 December 2006, Lewsley resigned from the Assembly in order to take up a post as Northern Ireland Commissioner for Children and Young People, and took up that post on 8 January 2007. She served two four-year terms as Commissioner and her final term came to an end in January 2015.

She was appointed Commander of the Order of the British Empire (CBE) in the 2015 New Year Honours for services to children's rights in Northern Ireland.

In 2017, Lewsley took up the role of Chief Executive Officer of Northern Ireland Childminding Association she served in this position for 9 years before stepping down in May 2026 to enjoy her retirement. Her successor being Alison McNulty who was appointed in June 2026.

Northern Ireland Assembly
New assembly	MLA for Lagan Valley; 1998–2007	Succeeded by Marietta Farrell
Party political offices
Preceded by Alex Attwood	Chairperson of the Social Democratic and Labour Party; 2004–2007	Succeeded by Eddie McGrady
