= Bruce Adamson =

New Zealand civil servant

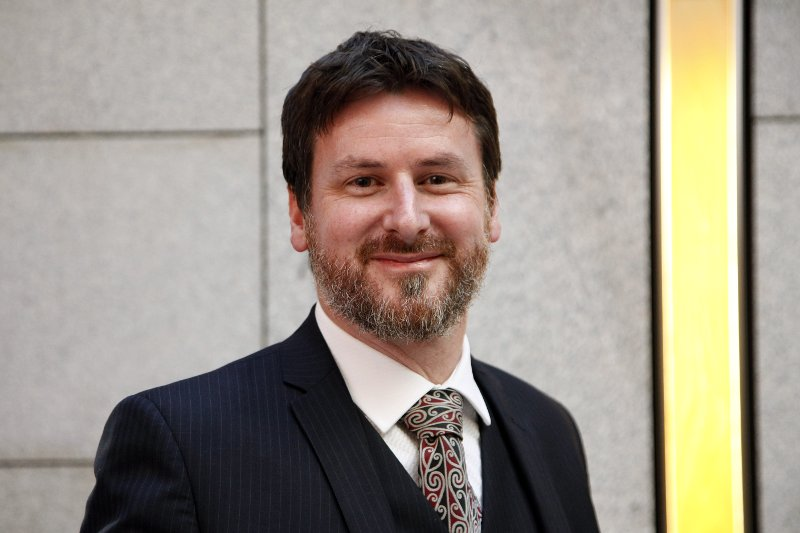
- Education: Victoria University of Wellington

Bruce Adamson is CEO of the Scottish Commission for People with Learning Disabilities having previously been Professor of Practice on a six month contract at the University of Glasgow's School of Law and, before that, the Children and Young People's Commissioner Scotland 2017–2023.

== Early life ==
Adamson was originally from Palmerston North, New Zealand. He attended Palmerston North Boys' High School. At the Victoria University of Wellington he gained a Bachelor of Arts (majoring in History) and a Bachelor of Laws.

Adamson practised in the family and criminal courts in New Zealand before moving to Scotland in 2002.

== Background ==
Adamson was part of the team when the Scotland's Commissioner for Children and Young People was set up in 2005.

He was a legal officer at the Scottish Human Rights Commission. and has worked as a member of Children's Panels.

In 2013 he was seconded to a position in Geneva with the Global Alliance of National Human Rights Institutions. representing institutions from over 100 countries working to improve human rights across the world.

== Children and Young People's Commissioner ==
On 14 March 2017, Parliament approved his nomination.

Adamson has spoken in support of a ban of smacking and the raising of the age of criminal responsibility.

== Academia ==
In October 2023, Adamson was announced by University of Glasgow as Professor of Practice at their School of Law for an initial six month period.
