= Childnet =

UK charity

- Founded: 1995
- Founder: Nigel Williams
- Registration no.: 1080173
- Purpose: To make the internet a great and safe place for children and young people.
- Location(s): Brockley, London, SE4
- Region served: England, Scotland, Wales, Northern Ireland
- Key people: Will Gardner, CEO
- Revenue: £500k – £1m
- Employees: 16
- Website: www.childnet.com

Childnet International is a registered UK charity that aims to make the internet a safe place for children and young people.

== Activities ==
=== Educational resources ===
Childnet produce educational resources for children, parents and teachers about a range of topics, including cyberbullying, sexting, copyright and grooming. These are available for free online or to order from the online shop. Childnet has a number of websites that provide advice and information: Childnet, KidSMART, and the UK Safer Internet Centre.

=== Education sessions ===
Childnet's Education Team run internet safety sessions for pupils, parents and carers, and staff members. They have worked with schools, local authorities, foster parent groups and local police forces.

=== Policy work ===
Childnet are involved in policy work in the UK and internationally, and they aim to facilitate the involvement of young people in the policy process.

Will Gardner, CEO of Childnet, sits on the executive board of the UK Council for Child Internet Safety. In November 2011, Childnet facilitated the involvement of young people in an executive board meeting of the UK Council for Child Internet Safety.

Childnet is part of Facebook's Safety Advisory Board, composed of five leading internet safety organisations. Facebook consults with these organisations on issues related to online safety.

Childnet launched the Youth IGF Project in 2009 to respond to constructive criticisms made of the Internet Governance Forum that there had been very limited involvement of young people at the IGF. Since then, Childnet has facilitated the involvement of young people from the UK in the annual conference, and in 2012, they delivered the first ever youth-chaired workshop at the IGF.

=== UK Safer Internet Centre ===
The UK Safer Internet Centre is coordinated by a partnership of three leading organisations; Childnet International, the Internet Watch Foundation, and the South West Grid for Learning. It is co-funded by the European Commission and has three main functions: an Awareness Centre, a Helpline and a Hotline.

=== Safer Internet Day ===
Safer Internet Day is celebrated worldwide to raise awareness about online safety. Many people take safety on the internet for granted and for that reason it is important to educate people about possible data breaches. Childnet, as part of the UK Safer Internet Centre, coordinate Safer Internet Day in the UK. Safer Internet Day 2015 saw over 800 organizations in the UK taking part to help promote the safe, responsible and positive use of digital technology for children and young people. For the day the UK Safer Internet Centre launched a new study Friendship in a Digital Age and launched the #Up2Us film, which was made by 150 young people to inspire others to do something kind online.
