= Northern Ireland Commissioner for Children and Young People =

The Northern Ireland Commissioner for Children and Young People (NICCY) is a publicly funded post, with responsibility for protecting children's rights as set out in the Convention on the Rights of the Child.

The position was established by the Commissioner for Children and Young People (Northern Ireland) Order 2003. Nigel Williams was the Commissioner from its introduction in 2003 until his death in 2006.

In day-to-day operation, the Commissioner is independent and free to determine his/her own priorities according to a number of guiding principles chief of which is a requirement that the rights of the child must be the Commissioner's paramount consideration; but also including, for example, a requirement to have regard to the role of parents. The remit includes the full spectrum of public authorities whose activities affect children and young people – including those operating in the non-devolved field, such as juvenile justice agencies, also to investigate complaints from individuals in particular circumstances.

== Commissioners ==
- Nigel Williams (2003 to 2006)
- Patricia Lewsley (2007 to 2015)
- Koulla Yiasouma (2015 to 2023)
- Chris Quinn (since 2023)

== See also ==
- Children's Commissioner for England
- Children's Commissioner for Wales
- Northern Ireland Public Services Ombudsman
- Scotland's Commissioner for Children and Young People
- Ombudsman for Children, Ireland
- Timeline of young people's rights in the United Kingdom
