= IRights Framework =

The iRights Framework is a set of five rights for the protection and empowerment of children on the Internet that adopts the United Nations Convention on the Rights of the Child. It was established through a coalition including the NSPCC, Nesta, Mind Candy, NASUWT, Joanna Shields and Mozilla. The organisation is working with Schillings for the legal assessment, which was presented in the House of Lords on June 3, 2015.

== The Five Rights ==
=== The Right to Remove ===
The option of being able to delete any activity generated before the age of 18 which could have been created out of immaturity. This allows the user to put behind past experiences that have long been forgotten but might be taken out of context and used against them in their adult life.

=== The Right to Know ===
Full knowledge and control over how their information is being used and what it is being used for and clear knowledge and understanding of what the disclosure of their data means.

=== The Right to Safety and Support ===
Children should receive support and protection from adults in order to easily understand their online activity and its consequences.

=== The Right to Make Informed and Conscious Choices ===
Children should have the information and ability to engage and disengage freely with creative and participatory part of the internet in order to develop and protect themselves.

=== The Right to Digital Literacy ===
Children should be educated on how to consume and create digital content freely and safely as well as managing their digital persona.

== United Kingdom ==
In the United Kingdom iRights Framework was adopted by iRights UK. One of their initiatives is the research on Youth Jury, gathering data on how young people perceive their need for privacy rights online. iRights supports Net-Aware.org.uk to provide guidelines and information on social networks to parents and educators.
