= Zinsmeyer Academy =

Defunct private school in California, USA

Location
- Long Beach, California, USA
- Coordinates: 33.782758°N 118.143123°W

Information
- Type: Private
- Authority: Childnet
- Website: Official website

Zinsmeyer Academy was a private school in Long Beach, California. The school was owned by the non-profit organization Childnet.
