= Children First Act 2015 =

Irish law

Oireachtas
- Long title: An Act for the purposes of making further and better provision for the care and protection of children and for those purposes to require the preparation, by certain providers of services to children, of child safeguarding statements; to require certain persons to make reports to the Child and Family Agency in respect of children in certain circumstances; to require certain persons to assist the Child and Family Agency in certain circumstances; to provide for the establishment of the Children First Inter-Departmental Implementation Group; to make provision for the preparation of sectoral implementation plans by Departments of State; to provide for the abolition of the common law defence of reasonable chastisement and, for that purpose, to amend the Non-Fatal Offences Against the Person Act 1997; and to provide for related matters.
- Citation: No. 36 of 2015
- Territorial extent: Ireland
- Passed by: Dáil
- Passed: 14 July 2015
- Passed by: Seanad
- Passed: 21 October 2015
- Signed by: President Michael D. Higgins
- Signed: 19 November 2015
- Commenced: Commenced in part: 11 December 2015; 1 May 2016; 11 December 2017

Legislative history

First chamber: Dáil
- Bill title: Children First Bill 2014
- Bill citation: No. 30 of 2014
- Introduced by: Minister for Children and Youth Affairs (James Reilly)
- Introduced: 10 April 2014
- Committee responsible: Health
- First reading: 30 April 2014
- Second reading: 7 May 2014
- Considered by the Health Committee: 11 November 2014
- Report and Final Stage: 14 July 2015

Second chamber: Seanad
- Second reading: 21 July 2015
- Considered in committee: 23 September 2015
- Report and Final Stage: 21 October 2015

Final stages
- Seanad amendments considered by the Dáil: 21 October 2015
- Finally passed both chambers: 21 October 2015
- Status: In force

The Children First Act 2015 (Act No. 36 of 2015) is an Act of the Oireachtas.

== Background ==
Ireland banned physical punishment against children in Irish schools since 1996.

The European Committee of Social Rights ruled that Ireland had failed to remedy Article 17 (the right of mothers and children to social and economic protection) by prohibiting corporal punishment of children.

The Minister for Justice committed to legislate to bring Ireland into 'full compliance' with the ruling.

== Commencement of the law ==
On 11 December 2015, the provision to ban smacking came into force.

== Impact ==
In 2020, Ireland was noted as still having a 'relatively high' acceptance of slapping children despite the ban on smacking.
