= Children's Commissioner for Wales =

Children's rights representative in Wales

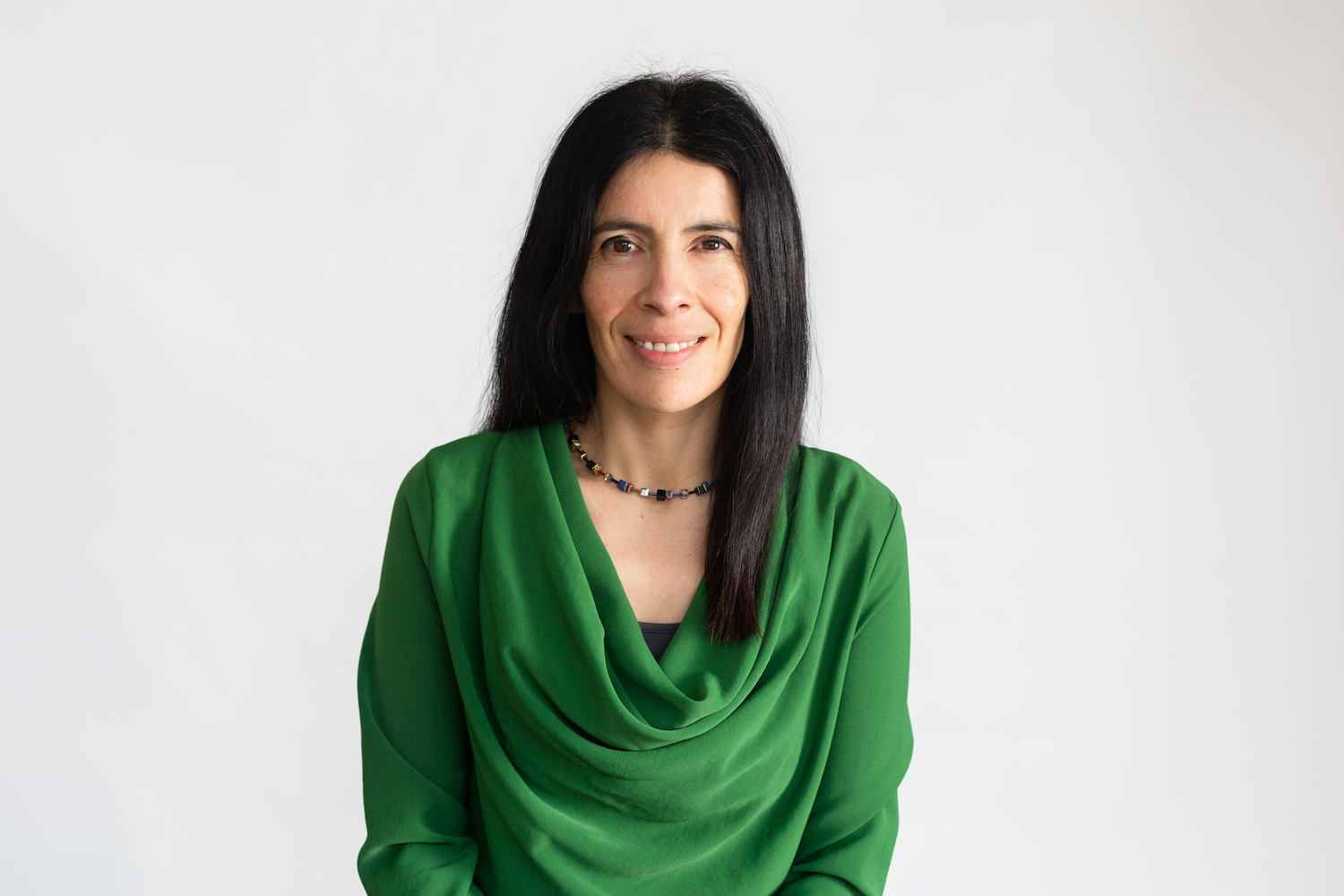
Rocio Cifuentes, the current children's commissioner for Wales

The children's commissioner for Wales is responsible for protecting children's rights as set out in the Convention on the Rights of the Child.

Peter Clarke was the commissioner from its introduction in 2001 until his death in 2007. The job interview process was notable for including children as panelists alongside adults. Keith Towler was Wales' second children's commissioner between 2008 and 2015. Sally Holland was children's commissioner between 2015 and 2022.

The current children's commissioner for Wales is Rocío Cifuentes, who took up her post in April 2022.

The post, equivalent to the Children's Ombudsman agencies of many other countries, was established following a decade-long campaign by children's organisations in Wales. In 2000, Sir Ronald Waterhouse published the report of his inquiry into abuse in children's homes in north Wales, and recommended the creation of a children's commissioner post to prevent such scandals in the future. The UK Parliament subsequently passed the necessary legislation for the position to be established - the Care Standards Act 2000. Initially, the legislation only included children in care, but this was expanded to all children by the Children’s Commissioner for Wales Act 2001.

The children's commissioner has a team of staff based in Port Talbot.

== Commissioners ==
- Peter Clarke (2001 to 2007)
- Keith Towler (2008 to 2015)
- Sally Holland (2015 to 2022)
- Rocío Cifuentes (2022 to present)

== See also ==
- Children's Commissioner for England
- Northern Ireland Commissioner for Children and Young People
- Scotland's Commissioner for Children and Young People
- Timeline of children's rights in the United Kingdom
- Children's Commissioner for Wales Strategy for 2026-2029
- Convention on the Rights of the Child
