= Children and Young People's Commissioner Scotland =

Scottish government agency

- Flag of Scotland
- Incumbent; Nicola Killean since August 2023; 3 years ago
- Reports to: Scottish Parliament
- Nominator: Scottish Parliament
- Appointer: Monarch of the United Kingdom; on the nomination of the Scottish Parliament
- Term length: 6 years
- Constituting instrument: Commissioner for Children and Young People (Scotland) Act 2003
- Inaugural holder: Kathleen Marshall
- Formation: April 2004; 22 years ago
- Salary: £77,260
- Website: www.cypcs.org.uk

The Children and Young People's Commissioner Scotland is a post in Scotland whose main task is to promote and safeguard the rights of children and young people. The position, equivalent to the Children's Ombudsman agencies of many other countries, was established by the Commissioner for Children and Young People (Scotland) Act 2003. The current Commissioner is Nicola Killean.

== Commissioner responsibilities ==
The Commissioner must review law, policy and practice relating to the rights of children and young people with a view to assessing their adequacy and effectiveness. Specific regard must be had to any relevant provisions of the United Nations Convention on the Rights of the Child, especially those requiring that the best interests of the child be a primary consideration in decision-making, and that due account be taken of the views of affected children and young people. The Commissioner cannot intervene in individual cases, however these can highlight issues affecting a broader range of children and young people and these issues can be investigated by the Commissioner. After an investigation the Commissioner can make recommendations to the Scottish Parliament on what action they feel is deemed appropriate.

The Commissioner consults with children and young people on a regular basis via the SCCYP website, and through the networks of organisations who work on or on behalf of children and young people.

== History ==
Scotland's first Commissioner, Kathleen Marshall, was appointed by Queen Elizabeth in April 2004, after a selection process which included her being interviewed by two groups of children and young people. Marshall was appointed for a period of five years, with the possibility of a further five-year period. Before taking up her post as Commissioner, Marshall worked as a child law consultant and from 1989 to 1994 she was the Director of the Scottish Child Law Centre.

Tam Baillie took up the position in May 2009, initially for a two-year term; he was reappointed in 2011 to serve until May 2017. Baillie was appointed in May 2009 after an interview process which included children and young people as well as Members of the Scottish Parliament. In 2009, the Commissioner's office began to plan a national consultation of children and young people in Scotland called 'a RIGHT blether'. As part of the consultation there was a national vote in which children and young people were able to influence the Commissioner's office's work plan for the next four years. Children and young people were able to vote on what they thought the Commissioner should take action on in four key areas: Where I live, where I learn and develop, My neighbourhood or community and Scotland. On 10 February 2011, Baillie was reappointed for a second term, to serve until May 2017. At that point the Commissioner's office had a budget of £1.3 million and employed fourteen people.

Bruce Adamson was appointed in May 2017 for a six-year term.

Nicola Killean, former Chief Executive of Sistema Scotland, was appointed in August 2023.

== List of commissioners ==
- Kathleen Marshall (April 2004 to April 2009); first commissioner
- Tam Baillie (April 2009 to May 2017)
- Bruce Adamson (May 2017 to May 2023)
- Nicola Killean (Assumed office August 2023 for six year term)

== See also ==
- Social care in Scotland
- Timeline of young people's rights in the United Kingdom
- Children's Commissioner for England
- Children's Commissioner for Wales
- Northern Ireland Commissioner for Children and Young People
