= Convention on the Rights of the Child =

International treaty about the rights of children

- Parties to the convention Signed, but not ratified Non-signatory
- Signed: 20 November 1989
- Location: New York City
- Effective: 2 September 1990
- Condition: 20 ratifications
- Signatories: 140
- Parties: 196 (all eligible states except the United States)
- Depositary: UN Secretary-General
- Languages: Arabic, Chinese, English, French, Russian, Spanish

Full text
- United Nations Convention on the Rights of the Child at Wikisource

Logo the UNCRC

The United Nations Convention on the Rights of the Child (commonly abbreviated as the CRC or UNCRC) is an international human rights treaty which sets out the civil, political, economic, social, health, and cultural rights of children. The convention defines a child as any human being under the age of eighteen, unless the age of majority is attained earlier under national legislation.

Nations that have ratified this convention or have acceded to it are bound by international law. When a state has signed the treaty but not ratified it, it is not yet bound by the treaty's provisions but is already obliged to not act contrary to its purpose.

The UN General Assembly adopted the convention and opened it for signature on 20 November 1989 (the 30th anniversary of its Declaration of the Rights of the Child). It came into force on 2 September 1990, after it was ratified by the required number of nations. As of 9 November 2026, 196 countries are party to it, including every member of the United Nations except the United States. Many countries have entered reservations or interpretative declarations for the convention.

Two optional protocols were adopted on 25 May 2000. The First Optional Protocol restricts the involvement of children in military conflicts, and the Second Optional Protocol prohibits the sale of children, child prostitution and child pornography. More than 170 states have ratified both protocols. A third optional protocol relating to communication of complaints was adopted in December 2011 and opened for signature on 28 February 2012. It came into effect on 14 April 2014.

== Contents ==
The UNCRC Articles with Icons

The convention deals with child-specific needs and rights. It requires that the "nations that ratify this convention are bound to it by international law." Ratifying states must act in the best interests of the child.

In all jurisdictions implementing the convention requires compliance with child custody and guardianship laws as every child has basic rights, including the right to life, to their own name and identity, to be raised by their parents within a family or cultural grouping, and to have a relationship with both parents, even if they are separated.

The convention obliges states to allow parents to exercise their parental responsibilities. The convention also acknowledges that children have the right to express their opinions and to have those opinions heard and acted upon when appropriate, to be protected from abuse or exploitation, and to have their privacy protected. It requires that their lives not be subject to excessive interference.

Article 19 of the convention states that state parties must "take all appropriate legislative, administrative, social and educational measures to protect the child from all forms of physical or mental violence", but it makes no reference to corporal punishment.

== Optional protocols ==
There are three optional protocols to the Convention on the Rights of the Child. The first, the Optional Protocol on the Involvement of Children in Armed Conflict requires parties to ensure that children under the age of 18 are not recruited compulsorily into their armed forces and calls on governments to do everything feasible to ensure that members of their armed forces who are under 18 years do not take part in hostilities. This protocol entered into force on 12 July 2002. As of 9 November 2026, 172 states are party to the protocol, and another 8 states have signed but not ratified it.

The second, the Optional Protocol on the Sale of Children, Child Prostitution and Child Pornography, requires parties to prohibit the sale of children, child prostitution and child pornography. It entered into force on 18 January 2002. As of 9 November 2026, 178 states are party to the protocol, and another 7 states have signed but not ratified it.

A third, the Optional Protocol to the Convention on the Rights of the Child on a Communications Procedure, which would allow children or their representatives to file individual complaints for violation of the rights of children, was adopted in December 2011 and opened for signature on 28 February 2012. The protocol currently has 52 signatures and 50 ratifications: it entered into force on 14 April 2014 following the tenth ratification three months beforehand.

=== Proposals ===
Proposals for additional optional protocols have also been made. In 2020, the independent "Lancet-WHO-UNICEF Commission" proposed the development of an optional protocol to protect children from the marketing of tobacco, alcohol, formula milk, sugar-sweetened beverages, gambling, and potentially damaging social media, and the inappropriate use of their personal data. (The WHO also has its own framework for making treaties.) In 2022, a group of international child rights and education experts joined a call for an update to the right to education under international law to explicitly guarantee children's right to free pre-primary and free secondary education. Human Rights Watch has suggested doing so through a fourth optional protocol to the CRC. In June 2024, the UN's Human Rights Council approved the establishment of a working group with the mandate of "exploring the possibility of, elaborating and submitting to the Human Rights Council a draft optional protocol to the Convention on the Rights of the Child with the aim to: (a) Explicitly recognize that the right to education includes early childhood care and education; (b) Explicitly state that, with a view to achieving the right to education, States shall: (i) Make public pre-primary education available free to all, beginning with at least one year; (ii) Make public secondary education available free to all."

On 7 October 2020, the vote on United Nations Draft Resolution A/HRC/45/L.48/Rev.1 – "Rights of the child: Realizing the rights of the child through a healthy environment" submitted by Germany (on behalf of the European Union) and Uruguay (on behalf of GRULAC) was adopted.

The Russian Federation's Amendments L.57 and L.64 to include parental rights were rejected. The Russian delegate, Kristina Sukacheva, remarked that governments voting against parents deliberately shirk their international responsibilities to provide for the rights of the child. At the time of adoption, Uruguay stated that the incorporation of parental rights language as proposed by the Russian Federation would "bring imbalance to the resolution and would also go against the spirit of the resolution".

== Interpretation ==
The UN Committee on the Rights of the Child, composed of eighteen independent experts, is the main monitoring body of the implementation of the convention by the states that have ratified it. Their governments are required to report to and appear before the UN Committee on the Rights of the Child periodically to be examined on their progress regarding the advancement of the implementation of the convention and the status of child rights in their country. Their reports and the committee's written views and concerns are available on the committee's website.

Individuals can appeal to the Committee on the Rights of the Child if they believe that rights, according to the convention, have been violated. The third possibility for monitoring the implementation of the convention is inquiries that the Committee on the Rights of the Child can carry out on their own initiative if they have reliable information that leads them to believe that a member state has violated the convention's rights. However, "states ... may opt-out from the inquiry procedure, at the time of signature or ratification or accession". Once a year, the committee submits a report to the Third Committee of the United Nations General Assembly, which also hears a statement from the CRC Chair, and the Assembly adopts a Resolution on the Rights of the Child.

In its General Comment 8 (2006) the committee stated that there was an "obligation of all state parties to move quickly to prohibit and eliminate all corporal punishment and all other cruel or degrading forms of punishment of children". The committee's judicial interpretation of this section to encompass a prohibition on corporal punishment has been rejected by several state parties to the convention, including Australia, Canada and the United Kingdom.

The European Court of Human Rights has referred to the convention when interpreting the European Convention on Human Rights.

Some interpretations of the convention have been criticized for systemic bias. Some interpretations of the best interests of the child have been criticized as ill-defined, inconsistently applied, unreasonably demanding or counter-productive.

=== Global standards and cultural relativism ===
Global human rights standards were challenged at the World Conference on Human Rights in Vienna (1993) when a number of governments (prominently China, Indonesia, Malaysia and Iran) raised serious objections to the idea of universal human rights. There are unresolved tensions between "universalistic" and "relativistic" approaches in the establishment of standards and strategies designed to prevent or overcome the abuse of children's capacity to work.

=== Child marriage and slavery ===
Some scholars link child marriages to slavery and slavery-like practices. Child marriage as slavery is not directly addressed by the convention.

In September 2026, the United Nations General Assembly adopted resolution A/RES/80/309, proclaiming 27 November as the International Day for the Elimination of Child, Early and Forced Marriage, reinforcing international efforts consistent with the Convention’s provisions on the protection of children from harmful practices.

== States party and signatories ==
The term "party" refers to a State that gives its explicit consent to be bound by the treaty.

As of 12 July 2022, 196 countries are parties to the UNCRC treaty, some with stated reservations or interpretations. Every member of the United Nations except the United States has either ratified or accepted the rights articulated for the child under eighteen or below the age of majority in that state. The most recent ratifications of the convention were by Cook Islands, Niue, the State of Palestine, and the Holy See. South Sudan ratified the convention in January 2015. Somalia's domestic ratification finished in January 2015 and the instrument was deposited with the United Nations in October 2015. Taiwan incorporated the convention into domestic law on 20 November 2014, and signed an Instrument of Accession to the CRC on 16 May 2016.

All successor states of Czechoslovakia (Czech Republic and Slovakia) and Yugoslavia (Bosnia and Herzegovina, Croatia, North Macedonia, Montenegro, Serbia, Slovenia) made declarations of succession to the treaty and currently apply it.

The convention does not apply in the territories of Tokelau, Akrotiri and Dhekelia and Gibraltar. Guernsey was also excluded until 2020.

=== Azerbaijan ===
Azerbaijan ratified the convention on 21 July 1992. In terms of the ratification of the convention, a significant number of laws, decrees and resolutions were approved in Azerbaijan by the President and the Cabinet of Ministers focusing on the development of the child welfare system. In this regard, the Convention No. 182 of the International Labour Organization, i.e. the Convention on the Elimination of the Worst Forms of Child Labour, the Recommendation No. 190 of the International Labour Organization and the Hague Adoption Convention were ratified by Milli Majlis, the parliament of Azerbaijan, in 2004.

There is a concern over the administration of juvenile justice in Azerbaijan, mostly regarding compliance with articles 37, 39, and 40 of the convention, as well as other relevant standards such as the Beijing Rules, the Riyadh Guidelines, and the United Nations Rules for the Protection of Juveniles Deprived of their Liberty. Therefore, international organizations assisted Azerbaijan to improve the situation in the field of juvenile justice. Juvenile offenders have been added to the Presidential pardons on a regular basis.

Azerbaijan has built cooperation with many international organizations, particularly with UNICEF in child protection. In 1993, UNICEF began its activity in Azerbaijan. In 2005, Azerbaijan and UNICEF signed a five-year country program. The country program for 2005-2009 was implemented in child protection, children's health and nutrition, children's education and youth health, and their development and participation. Also, UNICEF supports Azerbaijan in improving its juvenile justice system, establishing an alternative care system and raising awareness among youth about HIV/AIDS.

=== Bangladesh ===
Bangladesh ratified the convention on 3 August 1990, initially reserving Article 14 on freedom of thought, conscience, and religion, and fully withdrew the reservation on 2 March 2011. As required under the UNCRC, Bangladesh enacted the Children Act, 2013 (amended 2018), replacing the Children Act 1974 to provide comprehensive legal protection for children. The Act was explicitly drafted with regard to UNCRC principles, including juvenile justice, custody, and child welfare, though implementation gaps remain. Bangladesh ratified ILO Convention No 182 on the worst forms of child labour and later ratified Minimum Age Convention No 138 in March 2022.

Despite legal frameworks, juvenile justice remains problematic where the minimum age of criminal responsibility is still nine years, below the UNCRC-recommended 12 years. Child Development Centres (JDCs) established under the Children Act are few, overcrowded, and frequently accused of torture and inhumane treatment. Although every district is meant to have a separate Children's Court, most areas still rely on overburdened Women and Children Tribunals with no dedicated courtrooms.

In response, Bangladesh partnered with UNICEF to develop a national child protection system aligned with UNCRC standards through its Child-Friendly Justice initiative. On 24 March 2025, UNICEF welcomed government plans to establish separate Children's Courts nationwide as part of implementing the Children Act and aligning with international norms. Civil society and international monitors continue to call for stronger enforcement and resources to fully realize child protection commitments.

=== China ===
The People's Republic of China signed the Convention on the Rights of the Child on 29 August 1990 and ratified it on 2 March 1992.

=== Canada ===
Canada became a signatory to the convention on 28 May 1990 and ratified in 1991. Youth criminal laws in Canada underwent major changes resulting in the Youth Criminal Justice Act (YCJA) which went into effect on 1 April 2003. The Act specifically refers to Canada's different commitments under the convention. The convention was influential in the administrative law decision of Baker v Canada (Minister of Citizenship and Immigration), although the Supreme Court of Canada ultimately held that "Its provisions [...] have no direct application within Canadian law".

=== India ===
India ratified UNCRC on 11 December 1992, agreeing in principle to all articles but with certain reservations on issues relating to child labor. In India, there is a law that children under the age of 18 should not work, but there is no outright ban on child labor. The practice is generally permitted in most industries except those deemed "hazardous", for which minimum ages apply. Although a law in October 2006 banned child labor in hotels, restaurants, and as domestic servants, there continues to be a high demand for children as hired help in the home. There are different estimates as to the number of child laborers in the country. According to the government's conservative estimate, in 2011 4.4 million children under 14 years of age were working in India, while the NGO Save the Children in a statement of 2016 cites a study by the Campaign Against Child Labour that estimates the number of child laborers in India at 12.7 million.

In 2016, the Child and Adolescent Labour (Amendment) Act was introduced, which prohibited children's economic employment under the age of 14 years and the employment of adolescents (14–17 years of age) in hazardous occupations. Some exceptions exist for children under 14 —they can aid in the family enterprise and participate in the entertainment industry. It must not harm their school education and they must not work between 7 p.m. and 8 a.m.

=== Iran ===
Iran has adhered to the convention (except for alleged child slavery) since 1991 and ratified it in the Parliament in 1994. Upon ratification, Iran made the following reservation: "If the text of the Convention is or becomes incompatible with the domestic laws and Islamic standards at any time or in any case, the Government of the Islamic Republic shall not abide by it." Iran has also signed both optional protocols which relate to the special protection of children against involvement in armed conflict and the sale of children and sexual exploitation.

Although Iran is a state party to the convention, international human rights organisations and foreign governments routinely denounced executions of Iranian child offenders as a violation of the treaty. But on 10 February 2012, Iran's parliament changed the controversial law of executing juveniles. In the new law, the age of 18 (solar year) would be considered the minimum age for adulthood and offenders under this age will be sentenced under a separate law. Based on the previous law, which was revised, girls at the age of 9 and boys at 15 (lunar year, 11 days shorter than a solar year) were fully responsible for their crimes.

"According to Islamic sources, the criterion for criminal responsibility is reaching the age of maturity which, according to the Shi'ite School of the IRI, is 9 lunar years (8 years and 9 months) for girls and 15 lunar years (14 years and 7 months) for boys."

During the 2026 Iran war, Rahim Nadali, an IRGC official in Tehran, announced the launch of the initiative "For Iran" which recruits 12 year olds into the Basij militia for them to assist in manning "operational patrols" and checkpoints, as well as providing logistical support and performing other duties. This move contradicts Iran's commitment to abstain from the use of children in military activities under the Convention on the Rights of the Child. However, Nadali justified to move stating "Given that the age of those coming forward has dropped and they are asking to take part, we lowered the minimum age to 12". According to Al-Arabiya, from the beginning of the war, Tehran residents reported of untrained teenagers and youths armed with Uzi sub-machine guns and Kalshnikov rifles, stopping vehicles, shouting orders, and firing warning shots into the air.

=== Ireland ===
Ireland signed the convention on 30 September 1990 and ratified it, without reservation, on 28 September 1992. In response to criticisms expressed in the 1998 review by the UN Committee on the Rights of the Child in Geneva, the Irish government established the office of Ombudsman for Children. It drew up a national children's strategy. In 2006, following concerns expressed by the committee that the wording of the Irish Constitution does not allow the State to intervene in abuse cases other than in very exceptional cases, the Irish government undertook to amend the constitution to make a more explicit commitment to children's rights.

=== Israel ===
Israel ratified the convention in 1991. In 2010, UNICEF criticized the country for its failure to create a government-appointed commission on children's rights or adopt a national children's rights strategy or program to implement various Israeli laws addressing children's rights. The report criticizes Israel for holding that the convention does not apply in the West Bank and for defining Palestinians under the age of 16 in the occupied territories as children, even though Israeli law defines a child as being under 18, in line with the convention. A contemporaneous report by the Organisation for Economic Co-operation and Development found that Israel's investment in children is below the international average. The actual investment had fallen between 1995 and 2006. In 2012, the United Nations Committee on the Rights of the Child criticized Israel for its bombing attacks on Palestinians in the Gaza Strip, stating, "Destruction of homes and damage to schools, streets and other public facilities gravely affect children" and called them "gross violations of the convention on the Rights of the Child, its Optional Protocol on the involvement of children in armed conflict and international humanitarian law". It also criticized Palestinian rocket attacks from Gaza on southern Israel, which traumatized Israeli children, calling on all parties to protect children.

=== New Zealand ===
New Zealand ratified the convention on 6 April 1993 with reservations concerning the right to distinguish between persons according to the nature of their authority to be in New Zealand, the need for legislative action on economic exploitation—which it argued was adequately protected by existing law, and the provisions for the separation of juvenile offenders from adult offenders.

In 1994, the Court of Appeal of New Zealand dismissed the suggestion that the Minister for Immigration and his department were at liberty to ignore the convention, arguing that this would imply that the country's adherence was "at least partly window-dressing".

The Children's Commissioner Act 2003 enhanced the Children's Commissioner, giving it significantly stronger investigative powers. The Children's Commissioner is responsible for convening the UNCROC Monitoring Group, which monitors the New Zealand Government's implementation of the Children's Convention, its Optional Protocols and the Government's response to recommendations from the United Nations Committee on the Rights of the Child. The monitoring group comprises members from the Human Rights Commission (New Zealand), UNICEF New Zealand, Action for Children and Youth Aotearoa and Save the Children New Zealand.

In May 2007, New Zealand passed the Crimes (Substituted Section 59) Amendment Act 2007, which removed the defence of "reasonable force" for the purpose of correction. In its third and final vote, Parliament voted 113–8 in favour of the legislation.

=== Saudi Arabia ===
Saudi Arabia ratified the convention in 1996, with a reservation "with respect to all such articles as are in conflict with the provisions of Islamic law" which is the national law. The Committee on the Rights of the Child, which reviewed Saudi Arabia's treatment of children under the convention in January 2005, strongly condemned the government for its practice of imposing the death penalty on juveniles, calling it "a serious violation of the fundamental rights". The committee said it was "deeply alarmed" over the discretionary power judges hold to treat juveniles as adults: In its 2004 report, the Saudi Arabian government had stated that it "never imposes capital punishment on persons ... below the age of 18". The government delegation later acknowledged that a judge could impose the death penalty whenever he decided that the convicted person had reached his or her maturity, regardless of the person's actual age at the time of the crime or at the time of the scheduled execution. But the death penalty was ended for minors in April 2020.

On 20 October 2020, Human Rights Watch said that Saudi Arabia was seeking the death penalty against eight Saudi men who were accused of committing protest-related crimes at the age of 14 and 17. One of the boys who turned 18 in 2020 was charged with a nonviolent crime that he allegedly committed aged 9. Under the hudud – an Islamic law – prosecutors have reportedly sought the death penalty for the eight men, which if granted will make them ineligible for pardon.

=== South Korea ===
South Korea ratified the Convention of the Rights of the Child in 1991. The country then created further legislation to protect children experiencing physical and sexual abuse. However, a 2002 report indicated that South Korea had not yet satisfied article 12 of the CRC and that corporal violence of children in certain settings is not prohibited. A 2017 review by the Committee on the Rights of the Child concluded that further legal protections had been enacted such as legislation against child pornography, prostitution, and the ratification of the Convention on the Rights of Persons with Disabilities. A 2017 decision by the National Human Rights Commission of Korea ruled that no kid zones were discriminatory, but this did not legally restrict them from existing. The decision concluded that no-kid zones conflict with a child's right to equality under the constitution and the CRC. South Korea joined the Hague convention on International Child Abduction in 2012, but was criticized for its repetitive pattern of non-compliance. The pattern continued even after the 2023 Special Commissioner meeting of the Hague Conference, held in The Hague, Netherlands, in 2023, when the shared goal was reaffirmed between the Hague Convention and UNCRC.

=== Sweden ===
The Convention on the Rights of the Child has status as Swedish law since 1 January 2020. Also, before that, Swedish legislation was well in line with the convention and went in some cases further. It was given this status because Swedish authorities and the government thought the childs right perspective was not applied sufficiently in Swedish social welfare decisions and law enforcement.

=== Thailand ===
Upon accession to the convention on 27 March 1992, Thailand registered the following reservation: "The application of Articles 7, 22 and 29 of the Convention on the Rights of the Child shall be subject to the national laws, regulations and prevailing practices in Thailand." This reservation was withdrawn on 11 April 1997 with respect to article 29 (goals of education), on 13 December 2010 with respect to article 7 (birth registration, name, nationality, care) and finally on 30 August 2024 with respect to article 22 (refugee children).

=== United Kingdom ===
The United Kingdom ratified the convention on 16 December 1991, with several declarations and reservations, and made its first report to the Committee on the Rights of the Child in January 1995. Concerns raised by the committee included the growth in child poverty and inequality, the extent of violence towards children, the use of custody for young offenders, the low age of criminal responsibility, and the lack of opportunities for children and young people to express views. The 2002 report of the committee expressed similar concerns, including the welfare of children in custody, unequal treatment of asylum seekers, and the negative impact of poverty on children's rights. In September 2008, the UK government decided to withdraw its reservations and agree to the convention in these respects.

Although child slavery is difficult to gauge within the UK, child slaves are imported into the UK and sold. Laws and enforcement mechanisms against slavery and human trafficking were consolidated and strengthened in the Modern Slavery Act 2015.

==== Wales ====
The National Assembly for Wales, now known as the Senedd passed the Rights of Children and Young Persons (Wales) Measure 2011, partially incorporating the Convention into domestic law. The National Assembly for Wales passed the Children (Abolition of Defence of Reasonable Punishment) (Wales) Act 2020, banning smacking, by abolishing the "reasonable punishment defence."

==== Scotland ====
The Scottish Parliament passed the Children (Equal Protection from Assault) (Scotland) Act 2019, banning smacking, by removing the defence of "justifiable assault". In March 2021, the Scottish Parliament unanimously passed the United Nations Convention on the Rights of the Child (Incorporation) (Scotland) Bill, which partially incorporated the Convention into Scots law. The Bill was challenged by the UK Government and specified sections were found by the Supreme Court to be outwith the competence of the Scottish Parliament. The bill was amended and again passed in December 2023, receiving Royal Assent on 16 January 2024 and the United Nations Convention on the Rights of the Child (Incorporation) (Scotland) Act 2024 came into force on 16 July 2024.

==== Jersey ====
The States Assembly passed the Children and Young People (Jersey) Law 2022, banning smacking, by abolishing the defence of "reasonable corporal punishment". The States Assembly incorporated the Convention into domestic law through the passage of the Children (Convention Rights) (Jersey) Law 2022.

=== United States ===
The United States government played an active role in the drafting of the convention and signed it on 16 February 1995, but has not ratified it. A 2022 law review claimed that American opposition to the convention stems primarily from political and religious conservatives. For example, The Heritage Foundation considers that "a civil society in which moral authority is exercised by religious congregations, family, and other private associations is fundamental to the American order," and the Home School Legal Defense Association (HSLDA) argues that the CRC threatens homeschooling. Other Christian right organizations such as Concerned Women for America have argued that the CRC is an effort by globalists to remove children from their religious and family contexts; Christian right figures such as John Whitehead state that it will limit parental rights.

Most notably, at the time several states permitted the execution and life imprisonment of juvenile offenders, a direct contravention of Article 37 of the convention. The landmark 2005 Supreme Court decision in Roper v. Simmons declared juvenile executions to be unconstitutional as "cruel and unusual punishment"; in the 2012 case Miller v. Alabama, the court held that mandatory sentences of life without the possibility of parole are unconstitutional for juvenile offenders. However, the Court issued a ruling in Jones v. Mississippi that Miller does not require States to make an independent finding of "permanent incorrigibility" before sentencing the juvenile to life imprisonment without parole.

State laws regarding the practice of closed adoption may also require an overhaul in light of the convention's position that children have a right to identity from birth.

During his 2008 campaign for president, Senator Barack Obama described the failure to ratify the convention as "embarrassing" and promised to review the issue; however, this action did not occur during his tenure as president. No president of the United States has submitted the treaty to the Senate requesting its advice and consent to ratification since the US signed it in 1995.

The United States has ratified two of the optional protocols to the convention: the Optional Protocol on the Involvement of Children in Armed Conflict, and the Optional Protocol on the Sale of Children, Child Prostitution and Child Pornography.

== See also ==
- Adultcentrism
- Cartoons for Children's Rights
- Child advocacy
- Child custody
- Child labour
- Child laundering
- Child survival revolution
- Children's rights
- Children's rights education
- Children's rights movement
- CRY America
- Declaration of the Rights of the Child
- Evolving capacities
- Execution of Rizana Nafeek
- Global Movement for Children
- iRights Framework
- Inter-Agency Guiding Principles on Unaccompanied and Separated Children
- Intergenerational equity
- International child abduction
- International Play Association
- Save the Children
- Stop Child Executions
- Student voice
- Youth voice
- Worst Forms of Child Labour Convention, 1999
