= 1997 Lisburn Borough Council election =

Local government election in Northern Ireland

← 1993	21 May 1997	2001 →

All 30 seats to Lisburn Borough Council 16 seats needed for a majority
	First party	Second party	Third party
Party	UUP	Sinn Féin	Alliance
Seats won	13	4	3
Seat change	▼3	▲1	▲1
	Fourth party	Fifth party	Sixth party
Party	DUP	SDLP	Ulster Democratic
Seats won	2	2	2
Seat change	▼1	▼1	▲1
	Seventh party	Eighth party
Party	NI Conservatives	Others
Seats won	1	3
Seat change	0	▲2
- Results by district electoral area, shaded by First Preference Votes.

Elections to Lisburn Borough Council were held on 21 May 1997 on the same day as the other Northern Irish local government elections. The election used five district electoral areas to elect a total of 30 councillors.

== Election results ==
Lisburn Borough Council Election Result 1997
Party	Seats	Gains	Losses	Net gain/loss	Seats %	Votes %	Votes	+/−
UUP	13	0	3	▼3	43.3	36.6	11,799	▼2.5
Sinn Féin	4	1	0	▲1	13.3	13.7	4,427	▲4.4
Alliance	3	0	0	▲1	10.0	13.0	4,188	▲0.7
DUP	2	0	1	▼1	6.7	13.2	4,239	▼2.6
SDLP	2	0	1	▼1	6.7	5.8	1,859	▼2.1
Ulster Democratic	2	1	0	▲1	6.7	5.0	1,615	▲0.2
Ind. Unionist	1	0	0	0	3.3	3.3	1,068	▼0.8
NI Conservatives	1	0	0	0	3.3	2.9	935	▼1.2
Protestant Unionist	1	1	0	▲1	3.3	2.1	671	▲2.1
Ind. Nationalist	1	1	0	▲1	3.3	1.6	502	▲1.6
NI Women's Coalition	0	0	0	0	0.0	0.6	209	New
Workers' Party	0	0	0	0	0.0	0.6	192	▼1.2

Note: "Votes" are the first preference votes.

== Districts summary ==
Results of the Lisburn Borough Council election, 1997 by district
Ward	%	Cllrs	%	Cllrs	%	Cllrs	%	Cllrs	%	Cllrs	%	Cllrs	%	Cllrs	%	Cllrs	Total Cllrs
Ward	UUP		Sinn Féin		Alliance		DUP		SDLP		UDP		Conservative		Others		Total Cllrs
Downshire	39.0	2	0.0	0	17.0	1	28.0	1	0.0	0	0.0	0	16.0	1	0.0	0	5
Dunmurry Cross	20.0	1	50.1	4	3.2	0	2.6	0	16.2	1	0.0	0	0.0	0	7.9	1	7
Killultagh	47.1	3	0.0	0	9.1	0	24.1	1	17.0	1	0.0	0	0.0	0	2.7	0	5
Lisburn Town North	33.8	3	0.0	0	20.3	1	9.8	0	0.0	0	10.5	1	0.0	0	25.6	2	7
Lisburn Town South	54.4	4	0.0	0	19.4	1	9.3	0	0.0	0	15.8	1	0.0	0	1.1	0	6
Total	36.6	13	13.7	4	13.0	3	13.2	2	5.8	2	5.0	2	2.9	1	9.8	3	30

== Districts results ==
=== Downshire ===
1993: 3 x UUP, 1 x DUP, 1 x Conservative
1997: 2 x UUP, 1 x DUP, 1 x Alliance, 1 x Conservative
1997-2001 Change: Alliance gain from UUP

Downshire - 5 seats
Party	Candidate	FPv%	Count			
Party	Candidate	FPv%	1	2	3	4
UUP	William Falloon*	25.06%	1,328			
DUP	Edwin Poots	19.65%	1,041			
Alliance	Elizabeth Campbell	17.02%	902			
NI Conservatives	William Bleakes*	15.97%	846	784.9		
UUP	Kenneth Hull	6.64%	352	637.6	647.05	945.05
DUP	Jonathan Craig	8.32%	441	457.66	567.16	608.16
UUP	William Moore	7.34%	389	500.18	519.38	
Electorate: 12,872 Valid: 5,299 (41.17%) Spoilt: 81 Quota: 884 Turnout: 5,380 (41.80%)

=== Dunmurry Cross ===
1993: 3 x Sinn Féin, 2 x UUP, 2 x SDLP
1997: 4 x Sinn Féin, 1 x SDLP, 1 x UUP, 1 x Independent Nationalist
1993-1997 Change: Sinn Féin gain from UUP, Independent Nationalist leaves SDLP

Dunmurry Cross - 7 seats
Party	Candidate	FPv%	Count											
Party	Candidate	FPv%	1	2	3	4	5	6	7	8	9	10	11	12
Sinn Féin	Michael Ferguson*	15.45%	1,365											
Sinn Féin	Paul Butler	14.26%	1,260											
Sinn Féin	Sue Ramsey	11.60%	1,025	1,061.86	1,146.94									
UUP	Billy Bell*	10.90%	963	963.57	963.69	966.89	1,095.69	1,173.69						
SDLP	William McDonnell*	10.50%	928	933.89	937.73	1,006.16	1,006.16	1,064.35	1,066.35	1,071.35	1,480.35			
Sinn Féin	Ita Gray	8.79%	777	982.01	1,038.41	1,044.41	1,045.6	1,045.91	1,046.91	1,046.91	1,060.39	1,098.39	1,139.73	
Ind. Nationalist	Hugh Lewsley*	5.68%	502	504.85	507.01	542.01	543.01	600.01	607.01	610.01	690.94	959.94	960.24	966.3
UUP	Frederick Parkinson	5.36%	474	474	474	475	523	545	888	945	948	949	949	949.12
SDLP	Mary Rodgers	5.67%	501	502.52	504.08	517.46	517.46	541.46	542.46	542.46				
UUP	Andrew Park	3.73%	330	330	330.12	330.12	381.12	406.12						
Alliance	Owen Gawith	3.21%	284	284.76	284.88	298.88	301							
DUP	Yvonne Craig	2.67%	236	236.19	236.31	236.31								
Workers' Party	Frances McCarthy	1.88%	192	192.76	193									
Electorate: 18,255 Valid: 8,837 (48.41%) Spoilt: 194 Quota: 1,105 Turnout: 9,031 (49.47%)

=== Killultagh ===
1993: 3 x UUP, 1 x DUP, 1 x SDLP
1997: 3 x UUP, 1 x DUP, 1 x SDLP
1993-1997 Change: No change

Killultagh - 5 seats
Party	Candidate	FPv%	Count			
Party	Candidate	FPv%	1	2	3	4
UUP	Jim Dillon*	26.23%	1,432			
SDLP	Peter O'Hagan*	17.05%	931			
DUP	Cecil Calvert*	16.56%	904	949.72		
UUP	David Greene*	10.09%	551	919.64		
UUP	Kenneth Watson*	10.82%	591	668.4	686.12	973.12
Alliance	Trevor Lunn	8.96%	489	496.92	605.64	621.64
DUP	James Tinsley	7.55%	412	422.44	426.44	
NI Women's Coalition	Sybil Moses	2.75%	150	151.44		
Electorate: 12,966 Valid: 5,460 (42.11%) Spoilt: 84 Quota: 911 Turnout: 5,544 (42.76%)

=== Lisburn Town North ===
1993: 4 x UUP, 1 x Alliance, 1 x DUP, 1 x Independent Unionist
1997: 3 x UUP, 1 x Alliance, 1 x UDP, 1 x Independent Unionist, 1 x Protestant Unionist
1993-1997 Change: UDP gain from UUP, Protestant Unionist leaves DUP

Lisburn Town North - 7 seats
Party	Candidate	FPv%	Count								
Party	Candidate	FPv%	1	2	3	4	5	6	7	8	9
UUP	William Lewis*	17.39%	1,237								
Alliance	Frazer McCammond*	13.37%	951								
Ind. Unionist	Ronnie Crawford*	11.39%	810	838	844.56	850.52	852.08	1,027.08			
UUP	William Gardiner-Watson*	9.17%	652	751.12	764.52	798.12	799.14	809.5	857.34	870.8	932.8
Ulster Democratic	David Adams	10.52%	748	758.92	760.92	765.2	765.56	774.46	798.38	827.34	892.34
Protestant Unionist	William Beattie*	9.43%	671	692.28	697.56	702.12	702.3	724.04	735.08	760.92	788.74
UUP	Lorraine Martin*	5.74%	408	476.32	483.32	596.52	597	613.74	637.66	663.98	760.34
DUP	Eleanor Calvert	5.64%	401	408.56	412.84	415.52	415.7	433.7	440.14	645.82	656.72
Alliance	William Whitley	6.96%	495	503.4	531.68	535.52	587.06	602.46	622.79	627.66	
DUP	James Tinsley	4.13%	294	304.64	307.64	313.48	313.66	318.78	321.54		
Ind. Unionist	Anne Blake	3.63%	258	267.24	275.52	279.08	279.44				
UUP	Noel Malcolm	1.39%	99	172.36	181.2						
NI Conservatives	Leonard Jarvis	1.25%	89	92.92							
Electorate: 17,508 Valid: 7,113 (40.63%) Spoilt: 111 Quota: 890 Turnout: 7,224 (41.26%)

=== Lisburn Town South ===
1993: 4 x UUP, 1 x Alliance, 1 x UDP
1997: 4 x UUP, 1 x Alliance, 1 x UDP
1993-1997 Change: No change

Lisburn Town South - 6 seats
Party	Candidate	FPv%	Count				
Party	Candidate	FPv%	1	2	3	4	5
UUP	Ivan Davis*	26.73%	1,469				
Alliance	Seamus Close*	19.41%	1,067				
Ulster Democratic	Gary McMichael*	13.65%	750	844.56			
UUP	Thomas Archer	10.52%	578	749.84	781.8	791.37	
UUP	George Morrison*	7.04%	387	565.56	612.14	634.25	757.3
UUP	Joseph Lockhart*	8.26%	454	588.88	621.18	626.79	744.02
DUP	Stuart Deignan	9.28%	510	549.36	552.42	554.73	599.8
NI Women's Coalition	Bronya Bonar	1.07%	59	63.32	204.08	206.06	
Ulster Democratic	Philip Dean	2.13%	117	139.56	151.12	164.32	
UUP	Margaret Little	1.91%	105	141	152.22	155.52	
Electorate: 13,176 Valid: 5,496 (41.71%) Spoilt: 105 Quota: 786 Turnout: 5,601 (42.51%)
