= 1993 Lisburn Borough Council election =

Local government election in Northern Ireland

← 1989	19 May 1993	1997 →

All 30 seats to Lisburn Borough Council 16 seats needed for a majority
	First party	Second party	Third party
Party	UUP	DUP	Sinn Féin
Seats won	16	3	3
Seat change	▲1	▼2	▲1
	Fourth party	Fifth party	Sixth party
Party	SDLP	Alliance	Ulster Democratic
Seats won	3	2	1
Seat change	0	0	▲1
	Seventh party	Eighth party	Ninth party
Party	NI Conservatives	Ind. Unionist	Ind. Conservative
Seats won	1	1	0
Seat change	▲1	▲1	▼1
- Party with the most votes by district.

Elections to Lisburn Borough Council were held on 19 May 1993 on the same day as the other Northern Irish local government elections. The election used five district electoral areas to elect a total of 30 councillors.

== Election results ==
Lisburn Borough Council Election Result 1993
Party	Seats	Gains	Losses	Net gain/loss	Seats %	Votes %	Votes	+/−
UUP	16	1	0	▲1	53.3	39.1	13,216	▼10.8
DUP	3	0	2	▼2	10.0	15.8	5,350	▼2.0
Sinn Féin	3	1	0	▲1	10.0	9.3	3,138	▲1.7
SDLP	3	0	0	0	10.0	7.9	2,661	▼0.1
Alliance	2	0	0	0	6.7	12.3	4,169	▲1.6
Ulster Democratic	1	1	0	▲1	3.3	4.8	1,617	▲4.1
NI Conservatives	1	1	0	▲1	3.3	4.1	1,402	New
Ind. Unionist	1	1	0	▲1	3.3	4.1	1,394	▲4.1
Workers' Party	0	0	0	0	0.0	1.8	598	▼1.3
Independent	0	0	0	0	0.0	0.8	281	▲0.8

Note: "Votes" are the first preference votes.

== Districts summary ==
Results of the Lisburn Borough Council election, 1993 by district
Ward	%	Cllrs	%	Cllrs	%	Cllrs	%	Cllrs	%	Cllrs	%	Cllrs	%	Cllrs	%	Cllrs	Total Cllrs
Ward	UUP		DUP		Sinn Féin		SDLP		Alliance		UDP		Conservative		Others		Total Cllrs
Downshire	41.6	3	24.7	1	0.0	0	0.0	0	13.2	0	4.7	1	15.7	1	0.0	0	5
Dunmurry Cross	22.5	2	5.5	0	37.3	3	21.0	2	5.1	0	0.0	0	0.0	0	8.6	0	7
Killultagh	48.4	3	26.3	1	0.0	0	16.0	1	9.3	0	0.0	0	0.0	0	0.0	0	5
Lisburn Town North	34.3	3	18.9	1	0.0	0	0.0	0	17.9	1	5.9	0	2.9	0	20.1	1	7
Lisburn Town South	56.0	4	8.3	0	0.0	0	0.0	0	17.1	1	14.1	1	3.7	0	0.8	0	6
Total	39.1	16	15.8	3	9.3	3	7.9	3	12.3	2	4.8	1	4.1	1	6.7	3	30

== Districts results ==
=== Downshire ===
1993: 3 x UUP, 1 x DUP, 1 x Conservative

Downshire - 5 seats
Party	Candidate	FPv%	Count				
Party	Candidate	FPv%	1	2	3	4	5
UUP	Thomas Lilburn*	18.38%	1,104				
DUP	Charles Poots*	16.49%	990	1,030			
NI Conservatives	William Bleakes*	15.73%	945	999	1,010.61		
UUP	William Falloon*	13.62%	818	863	907.91	1,042.91	
UUP	William McConnell	9.64%	579	601	632.41	868.02	906.02
Alliance	Kenneth Hull*	13.25%	796	811	813.34	831.7	833.6
DUP	James McCann	8.18%	491	552	557.67		
Ulster Democratic	David Adams	8.18%	283				
Electorate: 12,290 Valid: 6,006 (48.87%) Spoilt: 124 Quota: 1,002 Turnout: 6,130 (49.88%)

=== Dunmurry Cross ===
1993: 3 x Sinn Féin, 2 x UUP, 2 x SDLP

Dunmurry Cross - 7 seats
Party	Candidate	FPv%	Count							
Party	Candidate	FPv%	1	2	3	4	5	6	7	8
Sinn Féin	Patrick Rice*	16.83%	1,417							
UUP	William McAllister*	15.02%	1,265							
SDLP	Hugh Lewsley*	12.78%	1,076							
Sinn Féin	Michael Ferguson*	11.16%	940	1,215.34						
UUP	Billy Bell*	7.43%	626	626	797.36	797.51	812.7	812.76	818.76	1,244.76
Sinn Féin	Anne Marie Armstrong	9.28%	781	841.58	841.58	994.13	1,011.65	1,012.37	1,041.14	1,041.31
SDLP	William McDonnell*	8.25%	695	707.22	707.56	710.11	816.04	833.72	1,035.6	1,037.6
Alliance	Elizabeth Campbell	5.07%	427	428.04	432.97	433.12	504.8	505.72	592.1	611.39
DUP	Jonathan Craig	5.50%	463	463	492.24	492.24	497.75	497.77	502.11	
Workers' Party	Anne-Marie Lowry	5.33%	449	453.16	453.84	454.29	491.63	492.83		
Independent	Peter McAnespie	3.34%	281	283.34	286.23	286.98				
Electorate: 16,184 Valid: 8,420 (52.03%) Spoilt: 307 Quota: 1,053 Turnout: 8,727 (53.92%)

=== Killultagh ===
1993: 3 x UUP, 1 x DUP, 1 x SDLP

Killultagh - 5 seats
Party	Candidate	FPv%	Count			
Party	Candidate	FPv%	1	2	3	4
UUP	Jim Dillon*	27.83%	1,550			
DUP	Cecil Calvert*	17.33%	965			
SDLP	Peter O'Hagan*	15.98%	890	890.8	890.89	1,064.89
UUP	David Greene*	7.61%	424	827.6	834.86	977.86
UUP	Kenneth Watson	12.91%	719	863	867.44	966.44
DUP	William Stevenson	8.98%	500	538	553.54	581.02
Alliance	Eileen Drayne	9.36%	521	543.8	544.73	
Electorate: 11,781 Valid: 5,569 (47.27%) Spoilt: 115 Quota: 929 Turnout: 5,684 (48.25%)

=== Lisburn Town North ===
1993: 4 x UUP, 1 x Alliance, 1 x DUP, 1 x Independent Unionist

Lisburn Town North - 7 seats
Party	Candidate	FPv%	Count									
Party	Candidate	FPv%	1	2	3	4	5	6	7	8	9	10
Ind. Unionist	Ronnie Crawford*	18.75%	1,394									
DUP	William Beattie*	17.03%	1,266									
UUP	William Gardiner-Watson*	8.16%	607	718.86	751.8	753.8	770.56	812.47	959.71			
UUP	Samuel Semple*	9.91%	737	791.4	822.99	823.26	867.9	903.06	951.22			
UUP	William Lewis*	9.71%	722	805.98	833.52	833.52	865	908.43	930.43			
Alliance	Frazer McCammond	9.68%	720	746.18	747.53	794.55	794.55	846.21	850.73	852.16	852.97	870.19
UUP	Lorraine Martin	4.55%	338	383.9	397.13	398.47	439.07	458.01	511.12	535.56	553.11	793.83
Alliance	William Whitley	8.22%	611	635.48	637.64	675.34	681.38	706.39	709.68	709.81	710.08	738.1
Ulster Democratic	Raymond Smallwoods	5.84%	434	452.36	469.1	470.1	487.88	492.49	544.38	546.2	548.63	
DUP	Josephine Challis	1.88%	140	177.4	363.43	364.43	375.95	392.44				
NI Conservatives	Leonard Jarvis	2.95%	219	250.96	259.33	263.33	266.16					
UUP	Andrew Park	1.98%	147	168.08	178.61	179.61						
Workers' Party	J. J. Magee	1.34%	100	103.06	103.6							
Electorate: 16,142 Valid: 7,435 (46.06%) Spoilt: 142 Quota: 930 Turnout: 7,577 (46.94%)

=== Lisburn Town South ===
1993: 4 x UUP, 1 x Alliance, 1 x UDP

Lisburn Town South - 6 seats
Party	Candidate	FPv%	Count								
Party	Candidate	FPv%	1	2	3	4	5	6	7	8	9
UUP	Ivan Davis*	31.21%	1,996								
Alliance	Seamus Close*	15.37%	983								
UUP	William Belshaw*	12.57%	804	1,158.2							
Ulster Democratic	Gary McMichael	14.07%	900	1,013.3							
UUP	Joseph Lockhart	6.18%	395	536.9	593.48	606.68	620.98	628.78	786.48	811.7	916.7
UUP	George Morrison*	3.88%	248	494.95	588.43	622.53	636.44	648.14	717.64	766.81	885.67
DUP	Edwin Poots	4.38%	280	309.15	317.35	327.8	332.35	335.5	346.31	537.12	572.76
NI Conservatives	Anne Blake*	3.72%	238	274.85	292.07	301.97	344.13	376.83	395.01	416.28	
DUP	Robin McMaster*	3.99%	255	285.25	300.01	308.81	313.91	317.66	327.02		
UUP	John Curry	2.14%	137	226.65	276.26	286.71	303.38	309.98			
Alliance	Trevor Lunn	1.74%	111	137.95	140.82	143.02					
Workers' Party	Gerard Dunlop	0.77%	49	50.65	51.06	51.06					
Electorate: 13,615 Valid: 6,396 (46.98%) Spoilt: 134 Quota: 914 Turnout: 6,530 (47.96%)
