= 2001 Lisburn Borough Council election =

Local government election in Northern Ireland

← 1997	7 June 2001	2005 →

All 30 seats to Lisburn Borough Council 16 seats needed for a majority
	First party	Second party	Third party
Party	UUP	DUP	Sinn Féin
Seats won	13	5	4
Seat change	0	▲3	0
	Fourth party	Fifth party	Sixth party
Party	Alliance	SDLP	Independent
Seats won	3	3	2
Seat change	0	▲1	▲1
	Seventh party	Eighth party	Ninth party
Party	Ulster Democratic	Ind. Unionist	NI Conservatives
Seats won	0	0	0
Seat change	▼2	▼2	▼1
- Party with the most votes by district.

Elections to Lisburn Borough Council were held on 7 June 2001 on the same day as the other Northern Irish local government elections. The election used five district electoral areas to elect a total of 30 councillors.

== Election results ==
Lisburn Borough Council Election Result 2001
Party	Seats	Gains	Losses	Net gain/loss	Seats %	Votes %	Votes	+/−
UUP	13	2	2	0	43.3	35.2	16,449	▼1.4
DUP	5	3	0	▲3	16.7	20.2	9,444	▲7.0
Sinn Féin	4	0	0	0	13.3	16.0	7,508	▲2.3
Alliance	3	0	0	0	10.0	11.0	5,169	▼2.0
SDLP	3	1	0	▲2	10.0	8.5	3,987	▲2.7
Independent	2	2	1	▲1	6.7	7.5	3,502	▲4.4
NI Conservatives	0	0	0	0	0.0	1.4	636	▼1.5
NI Unionist	0	0	0	0	0.0	0.2	64	New

Note: "Votes" are the first preference votes.

== Districts summary ==
Results of the Lisburn Borough Council election, 2001 by district
Ward	%	Cllrs	%	Cllrs	%	Cllrs	%	Cllrs	%	Cllrs	%	Cllrs	Total Cllrs
Ward	UUP		DUP		Sinn Féin		Alliance		SDLP		Others		Total Cllrs
Downshire	43.7	3	31.1	1	1.3	0	14.2	1	0.0	0	9.7	0	5
Dunmurry Cross	13.4	1	7.9	0	53.9	4	0.0	0	23.0	2	1.8	0	7
Killultagh	35.2	2	29.9	2	5.2	0	6.4	0	14.9	1	8.4	0	5
Lisburn Town North	44.0	4	17.1	1	4.2	0	17.7	1	0.0	0	17.0	1	7
Lisburn Town South	47.3	3	19.9	1	3.5	0	21.2	1	0.0	0	8.1	0	6
Total	35.2	13	20.2	5	16.0	4	11.0	3	8.5	3	9.1	2	30

== Districts results ==
=== Downshire ===
1997: 2 x UUP, 1 x DUP, 1 x Alliance, 1 x Conservative
2001: 3 x UUP, 1 x DUP, 1 x Alliance
1997-2001 Change: UUP gain from Conservative

Downshire - 5 seats
Party	Candidate	FPv%	Count				
Party	Candidate	FPv%	1	2	3	4	5
DUP	Edwin Poots*	23.65%	2,006				
UUP	James Baird	17.76%	1,507				
Alliance	Elizabeth Campbell*	14.16%	1,201	1,208.2	1,350.1	1,483.1	
UUP	William Ward	14.06%	1,193	1,273.7	1,315.9	1,460.9	
UUP	William Falloon*	11.87%	1,007	1,055.6	1,100	1,308.5	1,382.48
DUP	Allan Ewart	7.45%	632	1,025.3	1,044	1,159.2	1,168.44
Independent	William Bleakes*	7.18%	609	650.1	691.7		
UUP	Joanne Johnston	2.56%	217	255.4			
Sinn Féin	Cara McCann	1.31%	111	111.3			
Electorate: 12,983 Valid: 8,483 (65.34%) Spoilt: 119 Quota: 1,414 Turnout: 8,602 (66.26%)

=== Dunmurry Cross ===
1997: 4 x Sinn Féin, 1 x SDLP, 1 x UUP, 1 x Independent
2001: 4 x Sinn Féin, 2 x SDLP, 1 x DUP
1997-2001 Change: SDLP gain from Independent

Dunmurry Cross - 7 seats
Party	Candidate	FPv%	Count					
Party	Candidate	FPv%	1	2	3	4	5	6
Sinn Féin	Paul Butler*	17.78%	2,061					
SDLP	Patricia Lewsley	17.50%	2,029					
UUP	Billy Bell*	13.37%	1,550					
Sinn Féin	Michael Ferguson*	13.36%	1,549					
Sinn Féin	Sue Ramsey*	10.52%	1,219	1,306.6	1,321.6	1,333.3	1,333.58	1,599.38
Sinn Féin	Veronica Willis*	8.57%	993	1,007.1	1,012.5	1,017.1	1,017.17	1,470.27
SDLP	William McDonnell*	5.52%	640	682.9	1,191.4	1,334.4	1,346.02	1,459.12
DUP	Stephen Moore	7.85%	910	910.6	912.4	930.7	1,008.61	1,008.61
Sinn Féin	Paul Flynn	3.64%	422	866.6	885.8	896.6	897.02	
Independent	Malachy McAnespie	1.88%	218	225.5	254.3			
Electorate: 18,673 Valid: 11,591 (62.07%) Spoilt: 440 Quota: 1,449 Turnout: 12,031 (64.43%)

=== Killultagh ===
1997: 3 x UUP, 1 x DUP, 1 x SDLP
2001: 2 x DUP, 2 x UUP, 1 x SDLP
1997-2001 Change: DUP gain from UUP

Killultagh - 5 seats
Party	Candidate	FPv%	Count								
Party	Candidate	FPv%	1	2	3	4	5	6	7	8	9
UUP	Jim Dillon*	21.71%	1,923								
SDLP	Peter O'Hagan*	14.88%	1,318	1,323.06	1,333.52	1,351.52	1,751.32				
DUP	Cecil Calvert*	15.60%	1,382	1,414.43	1,417.43	1,471.12	1,473.12	1,475.12	1,516.12		
DUP	James Tinsley	14.26%	1,263	1,277.03	1,278.03	1,352.72	1,353.72	1,354.72	1,389.41	1,415.41	1,445.87
UUP	Samuel Johnston*	6.06%	537	782.87	785.1	827.02	827.25	828.25	978.76	986.76	1,210.82
UUP	Kenneth Watson*	7.43%	658	749.77	753.23	811.38	811.84	818.84	905.49	906.49	1,053.48
Alliance	Alison Gawith	4.96%	439	449.12	552.58	576.81	584.81	777.81	889.81	890.91	
NI Conservatives	Neil Johnston	4.73%	419	442.46	446.69	472.69	472.69	483.69			
Sinn Féin	Ita Gray	5.16%	457	457.69	458.69	462.69					
Independent	Gordon Ross	3.75%	332	335.91	336.91						
Alliance	Owen Gawith	1.48%	131	133.3							
Electorate: 14,118 Valid: 8,859 (62.75%) Spoilt: 160 Quota: 1,477 Turnout: 9,019 (63.88%)

=== Lisburn Town North ===
1997: 3 x UUP, 1 x Alliance, 1 x UDP, 1 x Independent Unionist, 1 x Protestant Unionist
2001: 4 x UUP, 1 x Alliance, 1 x DUP, 1 x Independent
1997-2001 Change: UUP and DUP gain from UDP and Protestant Unionist, Independent Unionist becomes Independent

Lisburn Town North - 7 seats
Party	Candidate	FPv%	Count						
Party	Candidate	FPv%	1	2	3	4	5	6	7
Alliance	Trevor Lunn	17.66%	1,903						
UUP	David Archer	15.03%	1,619						
UUP	William Gardiner-Watson*	11.05%	1,190	1,276.76	1,377.06				
UUP	William Lewis*	10.98%	1,183	1,276.6	1,328.11	1,353.11			
DUP	Jonathan Craig	9.62%	1,036	1,039.96	1,062.74	1,070.44	1,203.84	1,205.84	1,341.73
UUP	Lorraine Martin*	6.95%	749	832.88	872.32	902	973.56	1,036.48	1,246.49
Independent	Ronnie Crawford*	6.60%	711	761.4	769.39	820.72	906.58	954.3	1,125.05
DUP	William Leathem	7.50%	808	817	843.35	847.52	923.39	926.75	991.34
Independent	David Adams*	5.36%	577	624.16	631.47	647.52	700.83	790.03	
Sinn Féin	James Armstrong	4.19%	451	557.92	557.92	563.24	564.6		
Independent	William Beattie*	3.93%	423	443.16	455.74	470.79			
Independent	Adrian Creighton	2.90%	123	176.64	178.51				
Electorate: 17,506 Valid: 10,773 (61.54%) Spoilt: 167 Quota: 1,347 Turnout: 10,940 (62.49%)

=== Lisburn Town South ===
1997: 4 x UUP, 1 x Alliance, 1 x UDP
2001: 3 x UUP, 1 x Alliance, 1 x DUP, 1 x Independent
1997-2001 Change: DUP gain from UUP, UDP becomes Independent

Lisburn Town South - 6 seats
Party	Candidate	FPv%	Count							
Party	Candidate	FPv%	1	2	3	4	5	6	7	8
UUP	Ivan Davis*	21.57%	1,521							
Alliance	Seamus Close*	21.20%	1,495							
DUP	Paul Porter	15.04%	1,061							
UUP	Thomas Archer*	10.22%	721	865.67	934.14	949.71	1,006.05	1,007.3	1,016.3	
UUP	Joseph Lockhart*	8.39%	592	689.68	734.78	741.08	840.08	840.93	848.21	1,021.55
Independent	Gary McMichael*	7.22%	509	599.65	709.53	719.43	761.38	763.13	855.27	945.48
UUP	Margaret Little	3.59%	253	358.45	414.21	418.88	479.88	480.23	502.91	585.81
DUP	Allen Russell	4.91%	346	370.42	382.31	414.13	431.02	478.57	480.57	
Sinn Féin	Frances Kerr	3.47%	245	247.22	389.08	389.08	391.9	391.9		
UUP	Samuel Mateer	3.49%	246	284.48	319.74	326.34				
NI Unionist	Gary Teeney	0.91%	64	72.51	82.35					
Electorate: 12,339 Valid: 7,053 (57.16%) Spoilt: 199 Quota: 1,008 Turnout: 7,252 (58.77%)
