= Northern Ireland Assembly Public Accounts Committee =

The Northern Ireland Assembly Public Accounts Committee is appointed by the Northern Ireland Assembly to examine public spending, highlight good practice and poor value for money, and recommend improvements.

== History ==
The committee was created in 1999 following the Belfast Agreement. The committee considers issues across a wide range of areas such as education, health and justice.

== Membership ==
Membership of the committee is as follows:

| Party | Member | Constituency |
|---|---|---|
| SDLP | Daniel McCrossan MLA (Chairperson) | West Tyrone |
| DUP | Diane Forsythe MLA (Deputy Chairperson) | South Down |
| Sinn Féin | Cathal Boylan MLA | Newry and Armagh |
| DUP | Tom Buchanan MLA | West Tyrone |
| Sinn Féin | Pádraig Delargy MLA | Foyle |
| DUP | Stephen Dunne MLA | North Down |
| Sinn Féin | Colm Gildernew MLA | Fermanagh and South Tyrone |
| Alliance | David Honeyford MLA | Lagan Valley |
| UUP | Vacant | |

== 2022–2027 Mandate ==
| Party | Member | Constituency |
|---|---|---|
| SDLP | Daniel McCrossan MLA (Chairperson) | West Tyrone |
| DUP | Diane Forsythe MLA (Deputy Chairperson) | South Down |
| Sinn Féin | Cathal Boylan MLA | Newry and Armagh |
| DUP | Cheryl Brownlee MLA | East Antrim |
| DUP | Tom Buchanan MLA | West Tyrone |
| UUP | Robbie Butler MLA | Lagan Valley |
| Sinn Féin | Pádraig Delargy MLA | Foyle |
| Sinn Féin | Colm Gildernew MLA | Fermanagh and South Tyrone |
| Alliance | David Honeyford MLA | Lagan Valley |

=== Changes 2022–2027 ===
| Date | Outgoing member and party | Constituency | → | New member and party | Constituency |
|---|---|---|---|---|---|
| 5 March 2024 | Robbie Butler MLA (UUP) | Lagan Valley | → | John Stewart MLA (UUP) | East Antrim |
| 21 October 2024 | John Stewart MLA (UUP) | East Antrim | → | Colin Crawford MLA (UUP) | North Antrim |
| 31 July 2025 | Colin Crawford MLA (UUP) | North Antrim | → | Vacant | |
| 23 September 2025 | Cheryl Brownlee MLA (DUP) | East Antrim | → | Stephen Dunne MLA (DUP) | North Down |

== 2017–2022 Mandate ==
| Party | Member | Constituency |
|---|---|---|
| DUP | William Humphrey MLA (Chairperson) | Belfast North |
| UUP | Roy Beggs Jr MLA (Deputy Chairperson) | East Antrim |
| Sinn Féin | Cathal Boylan MLA | Newry and Armagh |
| SDLP | John Dallat MLA | East Londonderry |
| Sinn Féin | Órlaithí Flynn MLA | Belfast West |
| DUP | David Hilditch MLA | East Antrim |
| Alliance | Trevor Lunn MLA | Lagan Valley |
| Sinn Féin | Maolíosa McHugh MLA | West Tyrone |
| DUP | Gary Middleton MLA | Foyle |

=== Changes 2017–2022 ===
| Date | Outgoing member and party | Constituency | → | New member and party | Constituency |
|---|---|---|---|---|---|
| 17 February 2020 | Gary Middleton MLA (DUP) | Foyle | → | Harry Harvey MLA (DUP) | Strangford |
| 31 March 2020 | Trevor Lunn MLA (Alliance) | Lagan Valley | → | Andrew Muir MLA (Alliance) | North Down |
| 19 May 2020 | John Dallat MLA (SDLP) | East Londonderry | → | Matthew O'Toole MLA (SDLP) | Belfast South |
| 21 June 2021 | Harry Harvey MLA (DUP) | Strangford | → | William Irwin MLA (DUP) | Newry and Armagh |
| 18 October 2021 | Matthew O'Toole MLA (SDLP) | Belfast South | → | Cara Hunter MLA (SDLP) | East Londonderry |

== 2016–2017 Mandate ==
| Party | Member | Constituency |
|---|---|---|
| UUP | Robin Swann MLA (Chairperson) | North Antrim |
| SDLP | Daniel McCrossan MLA (Deputy Chairperson) | West Tyrone |
| UUP | Robbie Butler MLA | Lagan Valley |
| DUP | Trevor Clarke MLA | South Antrim |
| DUP | Gordon Dunne MLA | North Down |
| DUP | Alex Easton MLA | North Down |
| Sinn Féin | Michelle Gildernew MLA | Fermanagh and South Tyrone |
| Sinn Féin | Declan Kearney MLA | South Antrim |
| DUP | Carla Lockhart MLA | Upper Bann |
| Alliance | Trevor Lunn MLA | Lagan Valley |
| Sinn Féin | Oliver McMullan MLA | East Antrim |

=== Changes 2016–2017 ===
None

== 2011–2016 Mandate ==
| Party | Member | Constituency |
|---|---|---|
| Sinn Féin | Paul Maskey MLA (Chairperson) | Belfast West |
| SDLP | Joe Byrne MLA (Deputy Chairperson) | West Tyrone |
| DUP | Sydney Anderson MLA | Upper Bann |
| UUP | Michael Copeland MLA | Belfast East |
| SDLP | John Dallat MLA | East Londonderry |
| DUP | Alex Easton MLA | North Down |
| DUP | Paul Frew MLA | North Antrim |
| DUP | Paul Girvan MLA | South Antrim |
| UUP | Ross Hussey MLA | West Tyrone |
| Sinn Féin | Jennifer McCann MLA | Belfast West |
| Sinn Féin | Mitchel McLaughlin MLA | South Antrim |

=== Changes 2011–2016 ===
| Date | Outgoing member and party | Constituency | → | New member and party | Constituency |
|---|---|---|---|---|---|
| 25 October 2011 | Paul Frew MLA (DUP) | North Antrim | → | Adrian McQuillan MLA (DUP) | East Londonderry |
| 25 October 2011 | Jennifer McCann MLA (Sinn Féin) | Belfast West | → | Conor Murphy MLA (Sinn Féin) | Newry and Armagh |
| 1 July 2012 | Conor Murphy MLA (Sinn Féin) | Newry and Armagh | → | Vacant | |
| 2 July 2012 | Paul Maskey MLA (Chairperson, Sinn Féin) | Belfast West | → | Michaela Boyle MLA (Chairperson, Sinn Féin) | West Tyrone |
| 6 September 2012 | Joe Byrne MLA (Deputy Chairperson, SDLP) | West Tyrone | → | John Dallat MLA (Deputy Chairperson, SDLP) | East Londonderry |
| 10 September 2012 | Joe Byrne MLA (SDLP) | West Tyrone | → | Seán Rogers MLA (SDLP) | South Down |
| 11 September 2012 | Vacant | | → | Daithí McKay MLA (Sinn Féin) | North Antrim |
| 1 October 2012 | Alex Easton MLA (DUP) | North Down | → | Trevor Clarke MLA (DUP) | South Antrim |
| 11 February 2013 | Sydney Anderson MLA (DUP) | Upper Bann | → | Sammy Douglas MLA (DUP) | Belfast East |
| 15 April 2013 | Mitchel McLaughlin MLA (Sinn Féin) | South Antrim | → | Chris Hazzard MLA (Sinn Féin) | South Down |
| 7 May 2013 | Sammy Douglas MLA (DUP) | Belfast East | → | David McIlveen MLA (DUP) | North Antrim |
| 16 September 2013 | David McIlveen MLA (DUP) | North Antrim | → | Alex Easton MLA (DUP) | North Down |
| 6 October 2014 | Chris Hazzard MLA (Sinn Féin) | South Down | → | Phil Flanagan MLA (Sinn Féin) | Fermanagh and South Tyrone |
| 6 October 2014 | Michael Copeland MLA (UUP) | Belfast East | → | Roy Beggs Jr MLA (UUP) | East Antrim |
| 18 May 2015 | Alex Easton MLA (DUP) | North Down | → | Jim Wells MLA (DUP) | South Down |
| 7 September 2015 | Seán Rogers MLA (SDLP) | South Down | → | Claire Hanna MLA (SDLP) | Belfast South |
| 14 September 2015 | Daithí McKay MLA (Sinn Féin) | North Antrim | → | Conor Murphy MLA (Sinn Féin) | Newry and Armagh |
| 5 October 2015 | Adrian McQuillan MLA (DUP) | East Londonderry | → | Edwin Poots MLA (DUP) | Lagan Valley |

== 2007–2011 Mandate ==
| Party | Member | Constituency |
|---|---|---|
| Sinn Féin | John O'Dowd MLA (Chairperson) | Upper Bann |
| UUP | Roy Beggs Jr MLA (Deputy Chairperson) | East Antrim |
| Sinn Féin | Willie Clarke MLA | South Down |
| DUP | Jonathan Craig MLA | Lagan Valley |
| SDLP | John Dallat MLA | East Londonderry |
| DUP | Simon Hamilton MLA | Strangford |
| DUP | David Hilditch MLA | East Antrim |
| Alliance | Trevor Lunn MLA | Lagan Valley |
| SDLP | Patsy McGlone MLA | Mid Ulster |
| Sinn Féin | Mitchel McLaughlin MLA | South Antrim |
| PUP | Dawn Purvis MLA | Belfast East |

=== Changes 2007–2011 ===
| Date | Outgoing member and party | Constituency | → | New member and party | Constituency |
|---|---|---|---|---|---|
| 1 October 2007 | Willie Clarke MLA (Sinn Féin) | South Down | → | Mickey Brady MLA (Sinn Féin) | Newry and Armagh |
| 21 January 2008 | Mickey Brady MLA (Sinn Féin) | Newry and Armagh | → | Ian McCrea MLA (DUP) | Mid Ulster |
| 4 March 2008 | Patsy McGlone MLA (SDLP) | Mid Ulster | → | Thomas Burns MLA (SDLP) | South Antrim |
| 20 May 2008 | John O'Dowd MLA (Chairperson, Sinn Féin) | Upper Bann | → | Paul Maskey MLA (Chairperson, Sinn Féin) | Belfast West |
| 26 May 2008 | Ian McCrea MLA (DUP) | Mid Ulster | → | Jim Wells MLA (DUP) | South Down |
| 15 September 2008 | Simon Hamilton MLA (DUP) | Strangford | → | George Robinson MLA (DUP) | East Londonderry |
| 15 September 2008 | David Hilditch MLA (DUP) | East Antrim | → | Jim Shannon MLA (DUP) | Strangford |
| 29 June 2009 | Thomas Burns MLA (SDLP) | South Antrim | → | Patsy McGlone MLA (SDLP) | Mid Ulster |
| 18 September 2009 | George Robinson MLA (DUP) | East Londonderry | → | Jeffrey Donaldson MLA (DUP) | Lagan Valley |
| 18 September 2009 | Jim Wells MLA (DUP) | South Down | → | David Hilditch MLA (DUP) | East Antrim |
| 20 April 2010 | Jonathan Craig MLA (DUP) | Lagan Valley | → | Wallace Browne MLA (DUP) | Belfast East |
| 20 April 2010 | Jeffrey Donaldson MLA (DUP) | Lagan Valley | → | Stephen Moutray MLA (DUP) | Upper Bann |
| 3 August 2010 | Jim Shannon MLA (DUP) | Newry and Armagh | → | Vacant | |
| 14 September 2010 | Wallace Browne MLA (DUP) | Belfast East | → | Gregory Campbell MLA (DUP) | East Londonderry |
| 14 September 2010 | David Hilditch MLA (DUP) | East Antrim | → | William Irwin MLA (DUP) | Newry and Armagh |
| 14 September 2010 | Vacant | | → | Adrian McQuillan MLA (DUP) | East Londonderry |

== 2007–2011 Mandate ==
| Party | Member | Constituency |
|---|---|---|
| UUP | Billy Bell MLA (Chairperson) | Lagan Valley |
| UUP | Pauline Armitage MLA | East Londonderry |
| UUP | Roy Beggs Jr MLA (Chairperson) | East Antrim |
| DUP | Mervyn Carrick MLA | Upper Bann |
| Alliance | Seamus Close MLA | Lagan Valley |
| SDLP | John Dallat MLA | East Londonderry |
| DUP | David Hilditch MLA | East Antrim |
| SDLP | Donovan McClelland MLA | South Antrim |
| NI Women's Coalition | Jane Morrice MLA | North Down |
| SDLP | Danny O'Connor MLA | East Antrim |
| Sinn Féin | Sue Ramsey MLA | Belfast West |

=== Changes 1998–2003 ===
| Date | Outgoing member and party | Constituency | → | New member and party | Constituency |
|---|---|---|---|---|---|
| 1 July 2002 | Sue Ramsey MLA (Sinn Féin) | Belfast West | → | Conor Murphy MLA (Deputy Chairperson, Sinn Féin) | Newry and Armagh |
