= Lisburn South (District Electoral Area) =

District electoral area in Northern Ireland

- Lisburn and Castlereagh City Council DEA constituency

Current constituency
- Created: 1993
- Seats: 6 (1993-)
- Councillors: Jessica Bamford (APNI); Andrew Ewing (DUP); Alan Givan (DUP); Amanda Grehan (APNI); Tim Mitchell (UUP); Paul Porter (DUP)

Lisburn South DEA within Lisburn and Castlereagh

Lisburn Town South DEA (1993-2014) within Lisburn

Lisburn South is one of the seven district electoral areas (DEA) in Lisburn and Castlereagh, Northern Ireland. The district elects six members to Lisburn and Castlereagh City Council and contains the wards of Ballymacash, Ballymacoss, Knockmore, Lagan Valley, Lisnagarvey and Old Warren. Lisburn South forms part of the Lagan Valley constituencies for the Northern Ireland Assembly and UK Parliament.

It was created for the 1993 local elections, largely replacing the old Lisburn Town DEA and gaining areas from the Downshire DEA and Killultagh DEA, where it contained seven wards (Blaris, Hilden, Hillhall, Lagan Valley, Old Warren and Tonagh), and was known as Lisburn Town South. For the 2014 local elections, Blaris moved to Downshire West DEA, and Hilden moved to Lisburn North DEA, while Ballymacash, Ballymacoss and Lisnagarvey moved from Lisburn North DEA.

== Councillors ==
Election	Councillor (Party)	Councillor (Party)	Councillor (Party)	Councillor (Party)	Councillor (Party)	Councillor (Party)
March 2025 Co-Option	Amanda Grehan (Alliance)	Jessica Bamford (Alliance)	Tim Mitchell (UUP)	Alan Givan (DUP)	Andrew Ewing (DUP)	Paul Porter (DUP)
2023	Amanda Grehan (Alliance)	Peter Kennedy (Alliance)	Tim Mitchell (UUP)	Alan Givan (DUP)	Andrew Ewing (DUP)	Paul Porter (DUP)
2019	Amanda Grehan (Alliance)	Jenny Palmer (UUP)	Tim Mitchell (UUP)	Alan Givan (DUP)	Andrew Ewing (DUP)	Paul Porter (DUP)
2014	Amanda Grehan (Alliance)	Rhoda Walker (DUP)	Tim Mitchell (UUP)	Alan Givan (DUP)	Andrew Ewing (DUP)	Paul Porter (DUP)
2011	Stephen Martin (Alliance)	Roy Young (DUP)	Alan Carlisle (UUP)	Jenny Palmer (DUP)	Andrew Ewing (DUP)	Paul Porter (DUP)
2005	Seamus Close (Alliance)	Ivan Davis (UUP)	Jeffrey Donaldson (DUP)	Jenny Palmer (DUP)	Andrew Ewing (DUP)	Paul Porter (DUP)
2001	Seamus Close (Alliance)	Ivan Davis (UUP)	Thomas Archer (UUP)	Joseph Lockhart (UUP)	Gary McMichael (UDP)/ (Independent)	Paul Porter (DUP)
1997	Seamus Close (Alliance)	Ivan Davis (UUP)	Thomas Archer (UUP)	Joseph Lockhart (UUP)	Gary McMichael (UDP)/ (Independent)	George Morrison (UUP)
1993	Seamus Close (Alliance)	Ivan Davis (UUP)	William Belshaw (UUP)	Joseph Lockhart (UUP)	Gary McMichael (UDP)/ (Independent)	George Morrison (UUP)

== 2023 Election ==
2019: 3 x DUP, 2 x UUP, 1 x Alliance

2023: 3 x DUP, 2 x Alliance, 1 x UUP

2019–2023 Change: Alliance gain from UUP

Lisburn South - 6 seats
Party	Candidate	FPv%	Count							
Party	Candidate	FPv%	1	2	3	4	5	6	7	8
DUP	Andrew Ewing*	15.19%	1,139							
Alliance	Amanda Grehan*	14.82%	1,111							
DUP	Alan Givan*	13.85%	1,038	1,089.60						
Alliance	Peter Kennedy †	8.99%	674	674.24	677.30	707.33	707.55	949.27	1,324.27	
UUP	Tim Mitchell*	11.61%	870	871.44	962.86	963.58	965.12	971.12	1,007.29	1,065.29
DUP	Paul Porter*	9.16%	687	696	900.42	900.81	915.15	921.15	931.23	937.23
UUP	Jenny Palmer*	8.34%	625	628.42	692.90	693.59	694.27	706.42	727.48	745.48
Sinn Féin	Aisling Flynn	6.58%	493	493.42	494.42	494.90	494.94	671.09		
SDLP	Dee French	6.30%	472	472.42	476.42	477.32	477.34			
TUV	Stewart McEvoy	5.16%	387	388.44						
Electorate: 16,838 Valid: 7,496 (44.52%) Spoilt: 99 Quota: 1,071 Turnout: 7,595 (45.11%)

== 2019 Election ==
2014: 4 x DUP, 1 x UUP, 1 x Alliance

2019: 3 x DUP, 2 x UUP, 1 x Alliance

2014-2019 Change: UUP gain from DUP

Lisburn South - 6 seats
Party	Candidate	FPv%	Count					
Party	Candidate	FPv%	1	2	3	4	5	6
UUP	Jenny Palmer	12.60%	877	924	942	1,022		
DUP	Andrew Ewing*	10.60%	738	758	895	997		
Alliance	Amanda Grehan*	13.34%	929	947	949	965	1,176	
UUP	Tim Mitchell*	10.27%	715	742	758	859	969	1,010
DUP	Paul Porter*	10.14%	706	748	857	906	942	944
DUP	Alan Givan*	10.56%	735	758	825	890	934	940
SDLP	Brendan Corr	9.32%	649	654	655	661	738	822
Independent	Jonny Orr	7.67%	534	578	589	615		
TUV	Alison Chittick	5.52%	384	466	477			
DUP	Rhoda Walker*	5.08%	354	376				
Democrats and Veterans	Ricky Taylor	3.48%	242					
UKIP	Helen Love	1.42%	99					
Electorate: 15,521 Valid: 6,962 (44.86%) Spoilt: 82 Quota: 995 Turnout: 7,044 (45.38%)

== 2014 Election ==
This election was carried out under new ward boundaries, as a result of local government reform.

2011: 4 x DUP, 1 x UUP, 1 x Alliance

2014: 4 x DUP, 1 x UUP, 1 x Alliance

2011-2014 Change: No change

Lisburn South - 6 seats
Party	Candidate	FPv%	Count							
Party	Candidate	FPv%	1	2	3	4	5	6	7	8
UUP	Tim Mitchell	14.04%	874	890						
DUP	Alan Givan	13.06%	813	818	831	918				
DUP	Andrew Ewing*	11.18%	696	699	703	764	1,089			
DUP	Paul Porter*	12.33%	768	782	794	882	982			
DUP	Rhoda Walker	9.07%	565	570	578	661	737	924.96		
Alliance	Amanda Grehan	6.91%	430	481	719	727	744	749.92	754.92	765.32
NI21	David Cairns	7.10%	442	553	642	680	695	697.96	710.96	735.4
DUP	Alan Carlisle*	7.93%	494	497	504	561				
TUV	Andrew Moore	7.53%	469	475	480					
SDLP	Conor Quinn	6.79%	423	438						
Green (NI)	James McMurray	2.22%	138							
NI21	Andrew Doran	1.85%	115							
Electorate: 14,566 Valid: 6,227 (42.75%) Spoilt: 94 Quota: 890 Turnout: 6,321 (43.40%)

== 2011 Election ==
2005: 4 x DUP, 1 x UUP, 1 x Alliance

2011: 4 x DUP, 1 x UUP, 1 x Alliance

2005-2011 Change: No change

Lisburn Town South - 6 seats
Party	Candidate	FPv%	Count								
Party	Candidate	FPv%	1	2	3	4	5	6	7	8	9
DUP	Paul Porter*	27.57%	1,340								
DUP	Andrew Ewing*	14.42%	701								
DUP	Jenny Palmer*	13.31%	647	1,018.42							
DUP	Roy Young	5.62%	273	457.73	702.6						
Alliance	Stephen Martin	9.73%	473	483.78	488.48	496.48	496.74	551.72	587.19	663.15	756.15
UUP	Alan Carlisle	10.70%	520	553.81	588.12	612.57	615.41	628.41	633.88	639.88	646.88
UUP	Tim Mitchell	6.32%	307	322.19	346.16	361	362.76	375.74	378.74	380.29	392.29
Sinn Féin	Patricia Magennis	3.64%	177	177.49	177.49	177.49	177.49	179.98	204.98	266.96	
SDLP	Aisling Twomey	2.65%	129	133.9	135.78	137.78	137.88	141.86	189.86		
SDLP	Marzena Czarnecka	2.59%	126	126.49	128.37	129.37	129.37	135.37			
Green (NI)	Luke Robinson	2.24%	109	113.9	117.66	121.13	121.25				
Independent	Colin Preen	1.21%	59	65.37	67.72						
Electorate: 11,107 Valid: 4,861 (43.77%) Spoilt: 106 Quota: 695 Turnout: 4,967 (44.72%)

== 2005 Election ==
2001: 3 x UUP, 1 x Alliance, 1 x DUP, 1 x Independent

2005: 4 x DUP, 1 x UUP, 1 x Alliance

2001-2005 Change: DUP (three seats) gain from UUP (two seats) and Independent

Lisburn Town South - 6 seats
Party	Candidate	FPv%	Count					
Party	Candidate	FPv%	1	2	3	4	5	6
DUP	Jeffrey Donaldson	37.16%	2,109					
Alliance	Seamus Close*	17.65%	1,002					
DUP	Andrew Ewing	5.55%	315	918.54				
DUP	Paul Porter*	9.69%	550	813.34				
UUP	Ivan Davis*	10.34%	587	711.11	773.31	776.17	782.8	862.8
DUP	Jenny Palmer	7.40%	420	629.79	642.39	736	739.94	783.24
UUP	Thomas Archer*	4.03%	229	278.14	301.74	303.06	303.06	375.53
SDLP	Yvonne Byrne	2.57%	146	151.67	213.27	213.27	346.47	351.07
UUP	Denis Troughton	2.92%	166	198.13	216.13	218.88	220.08	
Sinn Féin	Martin Parker	2.68%	152	155.78	161.18	161.51		
Electorate: 10,869 Valid: 5,676 (52.22%) Spoilt: 144 Quota: 811 Turnout: 5,820 (53.55%)

== 2001 Election ==
1997: 4 x UUP, 1 x Alliance, 1 x UDP

2001: 3 x UUP, 1 x Alliance, 1 x DUP, 1 x Independent

1997-2001 Change: DUP gain from UUP, UDP becomes Independent

Lisburn Town South - 6 seats
Party	Candidate	FPv%	Count							
Party	Candidate	FPv%	1	2	3	4	5	6	7	8
UUP	Ivan Davis*	21.57%	1,521							
Alliance	Seamus Close*	21.20%	1,495							
DUP	Paul Porter	15.04%	1,061							
UUP	Thomas Archer*	10.22%	721	865.67	934.14	949.71	1,006.05	1,007.3	1,016.3	
UUP	Joseph Lockhart*	8.39%	592	689.68	734.78	741.08	840.08	840.93	848.21	1,021.55
Independent	Gary McMichael*	7.22%	509	599.65	709.53	719.43	761.38	763.13	855.27	945.48
UUP	Margaret Little	3.59%	253	358.45	414.21	418.88	479.88	480.23	502.91	585.81
DUP	Allen Russell	4.91%	346	370.42	382.31	414.13	431.02	478.57	480.57	
Sinn Féin	Frances Kerr	3.47%	245	247.22	389.08	389.08	391.9	391.9		
UUP	Samuel Mateer	3.49%	246	284.48	319.74	326.34				
NI Unionist	Gary Teeney	0.91%	64	72.51	82.35					
Electorate: 12,339 Valid: 7,053 (57.16%) Spoilt: 199 Quota: 1,008 Turnout: 7,252 (58.77%)

== 1997 Election ==
1993: 4 x UUP, 1 x Alliance, 1 x UDP

1997: 4 x UUP, 1 x Alliance, 1 x UDP

1993-1997 Change: No change

Lisburn Town South - 6 seats
Party	Candidate	FPv%	Count				
Party	Candidate	FPv%	1	2	3	4	5
UUP	Ivan Davis*	26.73%	1,469				
Alliance	Seamus Close*	19.41%	1,067				
Ulster Democratic	Gary McMichael*	13.65%	750	844.56			
UUP	Thomas Archer	10.52%	578	749.84	781.8	791.37	
UUP	George Morrison*	7.04%	387	565.56	612.14	634.25	757.3
UUP	Joseph Lockhart*	8.26%	454	588.88	621.18	626.79	744.02
DUP	Stuart Deignan	9.28%	510	549.36	552.42	554.73	599.8
NI Women's Coalition	Bronya Bonar	1.07%	59	63.32	204.08	206.06	
Ulster Democratic	Philip Dean	2.13%	117	139.56	151.12	164.32	
UUP	Margaret Little	1.91%	105	141	152.22	155.52	
Electorate: 13,176 Valid: 5,496 (41.71%) Spoilt: 105 Quota: 786 Turnout: 5,601 (42.51%)

== 1993 Election ==
1993: 4 x UUP, 1 x Alliance, 1 x UDP

Lisburn Town South - 6 seats
Party	Candidate	FPv%	Count								
Party	Candidate	FPv%	1	2	3	4	5	6	7	8	9
UUP	Ivan Davis*	31.21%	1,996								
Alliance	Seamus Close*	15.37%	983								
UUP	William Belshaw*	12.57%	804	1,158.2							
Ulster Democratic	Gary McMichael	14.07%	900	1,013.3							
UUP	Joseph Lockhart	6.18%	395	536.9	593.48	606.68	620.98	628.78	786.48	811.7	916.7
UUP	George Morrison*	3.88%	248	494.95	588.43	622.53	636.44	648.14	717.64	766.81	885.67
DUP	Edwin Poots	4.38%	280	309.15	317.35	327.8	332.35	335.5	346.31	537.12	572.76
NI Conservatives	Anne Blake*	3.72%	238	274.85	292.07	301.97	344.13	376.83	395.01	416.28	
DUP	Robin McMaster*	3.99%	255	285.25	300.01	308.81	313.91	317.66	327.02		
UUP	John Curry	2.14%	137	226.65	276.26	286.71	303.38	309.98			
Alliance	Trevor Lunn	1.74%	111	137.95	140.82	143.02					
Workers' Party	Gerard Dunlop	0.77%	49	50.65	51.06	51.06					
Electorate: 13,615 Valid: 6,396 (46.98%) Spoilt: 134 Quota: 914 Turnout: 6,530 (47.96%)
