= Killultagh (District Electoral Area) =

District electoral area in Northern Ireland

- Lisburn and Castlereagh City Council DEA constituency

Current constituency
- Created: 1985
- Seats: 7 (1985-1989); 5 (1993-)
- Councillors: Thomas Beckett (DUP); Claire Kemp (APNI); Gary McCleave (SF); Ross McLernon (UUP); James Tinsley (DUP)

Killultagh DEA within Lisburn and Castlereagh

Killultagh DEA (1993–2014) within Lisburn

Killultagh is one of the seven district electoral areas (DEA) in Lisburn and Castlereagh, Northern Ireland. The district elects five members to Lisburn and Castlereagh City Council and contains the wards of Ballinderry, Glenavy, Maghaberry, Stonyford and White Mountain. Killultagh forms part of the Lagan Valley constituencies for the Northern Ireland Assembly and UK Parliament, and part of the South Antrim constituencies for the Northern Ireland Assembly and UK Parliament.

It was created for the 1985 local elections, replacing Lisburn Area A and part of Lisburn Area C which had existed since 1973, where it originally contained seven wards (Ballymacash, Ballymacoss, Glenavy, Knockmore, Lisnagarvy, Magheragall and Moira). For the 1993 local elections it was reduced to five wards, losing Ballymacash, Ballymacoss and Lisnagavy to the new Lisburn North DEA, and gaining Ballinderry and Maghaberry. For the 2014 local elections, Moira moved to the new Downshire West DEA, and Knockmore moved to Lisburn South DEA, while Killultagh gained Stonyford and White Mountain.

== Councillors ==
Election	Councillor (party)	Councillor (party)	Councillor (party)	Councillor (party)	Councillor (party)	Councillor (party)	Councillor (party)
2023	Gary McCleave (Sinn Féin)	Claire Kemp (Alliance)	Ross McLernon (UUP)	Thomas Beckett (DUP)	James Tinsley (DUP)	5 seats 1993–present	5 seats 1993–present
May 2022 co-option	Gary McCleave (Sinn Féin)	Sian Mulholland (Alliance)	Ross McLernon (UUP)	Thomas Beckett (DUP)	James Tinsley (DUP)	5 seats 1993–present	5 seats 1993–present
2019	Gary McCleave (Sinn Féin)	David Honeyford (Alliance)	Ross McLernon (UUP)	Thomas Beckett (DUP)	James Tinsley (DUP)	5 seats 1993–present	5 seats 1993–present
July 2018 co-option	Máiría Cahill (SDLP)	William Leathem (DUP)	Alexander Redpath (UUP)	Thomas Beckett (DUP)	James Tinsley (DUP)	5 seats 1993–present	5 seats 1993–present
April 2018 co-option	Christine Robb (SDLP)	William Leathem (DUP)	Alexander Redpath (UUP)	Thomas Beckett (DUP)	James Tinsley (DUP)	5 seats 1993–present	5 seats 1993–present
May 2017 co-option	Conor Quinn (SDLP)	William Leathem (DUP)	Alexander Redpath (UUP)	Thomas Beckett (DUP)	James Tinsley (DUP)	5 seats 1993–present	5 seats 1993–present
June 2016 co-option	Pat Catney (SDLP)	William Leathem (DUP)	Alexander Redpath (UUP)	Thomas Beckett (DUP)	James Tinsley (DUP)	5 seats 1993–present	5 seats 1993–present
2014	Pat Catney (SDLP)	William Leathem (DUP)	Robbie Butler (UUP)	Thomas Beckett (DUP)	James Tinsley (DUP)	5 seats 1993–present	5 seats 1993–present
2011	Pat Catney (SDLP)	John Palmer (DUP)	Jim Dillon (UUP)	Thomas Beckett (DUP)	James Tinsley (DUP)	5 seats 1993–present	5 seats 1993–present
2005	Peter O'Hagan (SDLP)	Cecil Calvert (DUP)	Jim Dillon (UUP)	Thomas Beckett (DUP)	James Tinsley (DUP)	5 seats 1993–present	5 seats 1993–present
2001	Peter O'Hagan (SDLP)	Cecil Calvert (DUP)	Jim Dillon (UUP)	Samuel Johnston (UUP)	James Tinsley (DUP)	5 seats 1993–present	5 seats 1993–present
1997	Peter O'Hagan (SDLP)	Cecil Calvert (DUP)	Jim Dillon (UUP)	David Greene (UUP)/ (Ind. Conservative)	Kenneth Watson (UUP)	5 seats 1993–present	5 seats 1993–present
1993	Peter O'Hagan (SDLP)	Cecil Calvert (DUP)	Jim Dillon (UUP)	David Greene (UUP)/ (Ind. Conservative)	Kenneth Watson (UUP)	5 seats 1993–present	5 seats 1993–present
1989	Peter O'Hagan (SDLP)	Cecil Calvert (DUP)	Jim Dillon (UUP)	David Greene (UUP)/ (Ind. Conservative)	William Lewis (UUP)	Ronnie Crawford (UUP)	David Campbell (UUP)
1985	Paddy Ritchie (SDLP)	Cecil Calvert (DUP)	Jim Dillon (UUP)	Robert McNeice (DUP)	William Lewis (UUP)	Henry McGiffin (UUP)	Ronald Campbell (UUP)

== 2023 election ==
2019: 2 x DUP, 1 x Alliance, 1 x UUP, 1 x Sinn Féin

2023: 2 x DUP, 1 x Sinn Féin, 1 x Alliance, 1 x UUP

2019–2023 change: No change

Killultagh - 5 seats
Party	Candidate	FPv%	Count					
Party	Candidate	FPv%	1	2	3	4	5	6
Sinn Féin	Gary McCleave*	23.36%	1,958					
Alliance	Claire Kemp	22.22%	1,862					
DUP	Thomas Beckett*	18.01%	1,509					
DUP	James Tinsley*	15.48%	1,297	1,297.68	1,312.26	1,325.80	1,415.05	
UUP	Ross McLernon*	7.80%	654	657.74	732.80	765.65	776.78	1,398.14
SDLP	Jack Patton	4.34%	364	888.28	1,145.86	1,178.05	1,178.47	1,192.49
UUP	Laura Turner	7.86%	659	664.10	728.63	748.84	752.69	
Independent	Stuart Brown	0.93%	78	93.64	136.57			
Electorate: 15,956 Valid: 8,381 (52.53%) Spoilt: 68 Quota: 1,397 Turnout: 8,449 (52.95%)

== 2019 election ==
2014: 3 x DUP, 1 x UUP, 1 x SDLP

2019: 2 x DUP, 1 x UUP, 1 x Alliance, 1 x Sinn Féin

2014-2019 change: Alliance and Sinn Féin gain from DUP and SDLP

Killultagh - 5 seats
Party	Candidate	FPv%	Count						
Party	Candidate	FPv%	1	2	3	4	5	6	7
Alliance	David Honeyford †	20.30%	1,524						
UUP	Ross McLernon	9.40%	707	729	775.8	1,313.8			
Sinn Féin	Gary McCleave	13.22%	994	996	1,022.8	1,024.8	1,025.22	1,438.22	
DUP	Thomas Beckett*	14.18%	1,006	1,018	1,024.6	1,047.4	1,058.88	1,091.66	1,115.66
DUP	James Tinsley*	13.03%	979	988	993.8	1,032.8	1,057.3	1,079.28	1,102.28
DUP	William Leathem*	10.87%	871	885	891.2	909.4	923.4	925.16	944.16
SDLP	Ally Haydock	9.25%	695	717	863.3	884.6	891.46		
UUP	Alexander Redpath*	8.41%	632	639	667.2				
Independent	Stuart Brown	1.42%	107						
Electorate: 14,361 Valid: 7,515 (52.33%) Spoilt: 76 Quota: 1,253 Turnout: 7,591 (52.86%)

== 2014 election ==
2011: 3 x DUP, 1 x UUP, 1 x SDLP

2014: 3 x DUP, 1 x UUP, 1 x SDLP

2011-2014 change: No change

Killultagh - 5 seats
Party	Candidate	FPv%	Count				
Party	Candidate	FPv%	1	2	3	4	5
DUP	Thomas Beckett*	18.78%	1,216				
UUP	Robbie Butler †	18.22%	1,180				
SDLP	Pat Catney* †††	10.78%	698	700.42	703.12	774.97	1,072.61
DUP	William Leathem	12.49%	809	897.44	936.86	980.51	1,040.93
DUP	James Tinsley*	13.34%	864	896.67	929.7	965.66	1,018.47
Sinn Féin	Mary Quinn	13.19%	854	854.33	854.42	870.51	900.62
Alliance	Jonnie McCrea	7.03%	455	458.96	466.7	654.73	
NI21	David Honeyford	6.16%	399	402.19	414.7		
Electorate: 12,863 Valid: 6,475 (50.34%) Spoilt: 59 Quota: 1,080 Turnout: 6,534 (50.80%)

== 2011 election ==
2005: 3 x DUP, 1 x UUP, 1 x SDLP

2011: 3 x DUP, 1 x UUP, 1 x SDLP

2005-2011 change: No change

Killultagh - 5 seats
Party	Candidate	FPv%	Count					
Party	Candidate	FPv%	1	2	3	4	5	6
DUP	Thomas Beckett*	20.54%	1,756					
DUP	James Tinsley*	18.24%	1,559					
SDLP	Pat Catney	10.50%	898	902.37	902.93	923.23	1,526.23	
UUP	Jim Dillon*	8.91%	762	788.03	794.91	917.97	919.97	1,425.97
DUP	John Palmer	8.94%	764	1,007.01	1,108.05	1,211.76	1,216.49	1,342.28
Alliance	Owen Gawith	10.42%	891	897.46	899.86	978.92	1,036.27	1,102.27
UUP	Roy Hanna	7.91%	676	693.1	698.3	790.95	795.22	
Sinn Féin	Mary-Kate Quinn	9.03%	772	773.14	773.7	778.08		
Independent	Cecil Calvert*	2.68%	229	249.33	253.17			
NI Conservatives	Steve McIlwrath	2.83%	242	250.17	251.53			
Electorate: 16,299 Valid: 8,549 (52.45%) Spoilt: 140 Quota: 1,425 Turnout: 8,689 (53.31%)

== 2005 election ==
2001: 2 x UUP, 2 x DUP, 1 x SDLP

2005: 3 x DUP, 1 x UUP, 1 x SDLP

2001-2005 change: DUP gain from UUP

Killultagh - 5 seats
Party	Candidate	FPv%	Count						
Party	Candidate	FPv%	1	2	3	4	5	6	7
DUP	Thomas Beckett	20.77%	1,751						
SDLP	Peter O'Hagan*	11.59%	977	978.33	986.33	1,003.33	1,531.33		
UUP	Jim Dillon*	12.41%	1,046	1,054.17	1,164.17	1,243.55	1,246.74	1,252.34	1,560.34
DUP	Cecil Calvert*	12.44%	1,049	1,304.74	1,322.69	1,373.26	1,379.26	1,379.61	1,436.61
DUP	James Tinsley*	15.17%	1,279	1,333.15	1,343.72	1,367.1	1,367.1	1,370.25	1,471.25
Alliance	Owen Gawith	6.86%	578	579.52	600.71	678.71	714.71	824.96	928.96
UUP	Samuel Johnston*	5.46%	460	463.8	584.56	654.56	656.56	661.11	
Sinn Féin	Chris Donnelly	7.73%	652	652.38	652.38	653.38			
NI Conservatives	Neil Johnston	3.95%	333	334.71	348.71				
UUP	David Greene	3.63%	306	308.85					
Electorate: 14,029 Valid: 8,431 (60.10%) Spoilt: 122 Quota: 1,406 Turnout: 8,553 (60.97%)

== 2001 election ==
1997: 3 x UUP, 1 x DUP, 1 x SDLP

2001: 2 x DUP, 2 x UUP, 1 x SDLP

1997-2001 change: DUP gain from UUP

Killultagh - 5 seats
Party	Candidate	FPv%	Count								
Party	Candidate	FPv%	1	2	3	4	5	6	7	8	9
UUP	Jim Dillon*	21.71%	1,923								
SDLP	Peter O'Hagan*	14.88%	1,318	1,323.06	1,333.52	1,351.52	1,751.32				
DUP	Cecil Calvert*	15.60%	1,382	1,414.43	1,417.43	1,471.12	1,473.12	1,475.12	1,516.12		
DUP	James Tinsley	14.26%	1,263	1,277.03	1,278.03	1,352.72	1,353.72	1,354.72	1,389.41	1,415.41	1,445.87
UUP	Samuel Johnston*	6.06%	537	782.87	785.1	827.02	827.25	828.25	978.76	986.76	1,210.82
UUP	Kenneth Watson*	7.43%	658	749.77	753.23	811.38	811.84	818.84	905.49	906.49	1,053.48
Alliance	Alison Gawith	4.96%	439	449.12	552.58	576.81	584.81	777.81	889.81	890.91	
NI Conservatives	Neil Johnston	4.73%	419	442.46	446.69	472.69	472.69	483.69			
Sinn Féin	Ita Gray	5.16%	457	457.69	458.69	462.69					
Independent	Gordon Ross	3.75%	332	335.91	336.91						
Alliance	Owen Gawith	1.48%	131	133.3							
Electorate: 14,118 Valid: 8,859 (62.75%) Spoilt: 160 Quota: 1,477 Turnout: 9,019 (63.88%)

== 1997 election ==
1993: 3 x UUP, 1 x DUP, 1 x SDLP

1997: 3 x UUP, 1 x DUP, 1 x SDLP

1993-1997 change: No change

Killultagh - 5 seats
Party	Candidate	FPv%	Count			
Party	Candidate	FPv%	1	2	3	4
UUP	Jim Dillon*	26.23%	1,432			
SDLP	Peter O'Hagan*	17.05%	931			
DUP	Cecil Calvert*	16.56%	904	949.72		
UUP	David Greene*	10.09%	551	919.64		
UUP	Kenneth Watson*	10.82%	591	668.4	686.12	973.12
Alliance	Trevor Lunn	8.96%	489	496.92	605.64	621.64
DUP	James Tinsley	7.55%	412	422.44	426.44	
NI Women's Coalition	Sybil Moses	2.75%	150	151.44		
Electorate: 12,966 Valid: 5,460 (42.11%) Spoilt: 84 Quota: 911 Turnout: 5,544 (42.76%)

== 1993 election ==
1989: 4 x UUP, 1 x DUP, 1 x SDLP, 1 x Independent Conservative

1993: 3 x UUP, 1 x DUP, 1 x SDLP

1989-1993 change: UUP loss (two seats) due to the reduction of two seats, Independent Conservative joins UUP

Killultagh - 5 seats
Party	Candidate	FPv%	Count			
Party	Candidate	FPv%	1	2	3	4
UUP	Jim Dillon*	27.83%	1,550			
DUP	Cecil Calvert*	17.33%	965			
SDLP	Peter O'Hagan*	15.98%	890	890.8	890.89	1,064.89
UUP	David Greene*	7.61%	424	827.6	834.86	977.86
UUP	Kenneth Watson	12.91%	719	863	867.44	966.44
DUP	William Stevenson	8.98%	500	538	553.54	581.02
Alliance	Eileen Drayne	9.36%	521	543.8	544.73	
Electorate: 11,781 Valid: 5,569 (47.27%) Spoilt: 115 Quota: 929 Turnout: 5,684 (48.25%)

== 1989 election ==
1985: 4 x UUP, 2 x DUP, 1 x SDLP

1989: 4 x UUP, 1 x DUP, 1 x SDLP, 1 x Independent Conservative

1985-1989 change: Independent Conservative gain from DUP

Killultagh - 7 seats
Party	Candidate	FPv%	Count						
Party	Candidate	FPv%	1	2	3	4	5	6	7
UUP	David Campbell	21.39%	2,072						
UUP	Ronnie Crawford	9.46%	917	1,371.69					
UUP	Jim Dillon*	12.50%	1,211	1,352.86					
DUP	Cecil Calvert*	12.41%	1,202	1,294.66					
UUP	William Lewis*	9.56%	926	1,021.12	1,141.92	1,250.6			
SDLP	Peter O'Hagan	10.92%	1,058	1,059.64	1,059.8	1,059.8	1,083.8	1,086.96	1,091.28
Ind. Conservative	David Greene	7.76%	752	765.53	775.13	783.49	788.9	827.19	1,024.49
Alliance	Eileen Drayne	7.64%	740	752.71	758.63	761.71	794.12	813.92	845.02
DUP	William Stevenson	5.20%	504	524.91	533.87	545.75	548.91	653.91	
Ulster Democratic	Richard Haggan	2.43%	235	241.97	253.81	261.29	264.29		
Workers' Party	Anne-Marie Lowry	0.74%	72	72.82	73.62	73.62			
Electorate: 18,323 Valid: 9,689 (52.88%) Spoilt: 141 Quota: 1,212 Turnout: 9,830 (53.65%)

== 1985 election ==
1985: 4 x UUP, 2 x DUP, 1 x SDLP

Killultagh - 7 seats
Party	Candidate	FPv%	Count				
Party	Candidate	FPv%	1	2	3	4	5
UUP	Ronald Campbell*	26.22%	2,386				
DUP	Cecil Calvert	14.63%	1,331				
UUP	William Lewis	12.78%	1,163				
UUP	Jim Dillon*	10.96%	997	1,968.49			
UUP	Henry McGiffin	3.30%	300	447.34	1,124.84		
DUP	Robert McNeice*	6.13%	558	613.12	685.12	808.87	1,338.87
SDLP	Paddy Ritchie	11.76%	1,070	1,073.71	1,074.71	1,074.71	1,079.29
Alliance	Eileen Drayne	7.74%	704	731.03	765.03	768.78	805.72
DUP	Henry Stevenson	6.49%	591	625.45	664.95	707.1	
Electorate: 15,793 Valid: 9,100 (57.62%) Spoilt: 133 Quota: 1,138 Turnout: 9,233 (58.46%)
