= Dunmurry Cross (District Electoral Area) =

District electoral areas in Ards, Northern Ireland

Dunmurry Cross DEA (1993-2014) within Lisburn

Dunmurry Cross was one of the district electoral areas in Lisburn, Northern Ireland which existed from 1985 to 2014. It was one of four Lisburn DEAs until 1993, and one of five until 2014. The district elected seven members to Lisburn City Council and formed part of Belfast West constituencies for the Northern Ireland Assembly and UK Parliament and part of the Lagan Valley constituencies for the Northern Ireland Assembly and UK Parliament.

It was created for the 1985 local elections. It contained the whole of Lisburn Area E which had existed since 1973 and the addition of the Lambeg area from Lisburn Area D. It contained the wards of Collin Glen, Derryaghy, Dunmurry, Kilwee, Lambeg, Seymour Hill and Twinbrook. For the 1993 local elections, Lambeg moved to the new Lisburn North DEA, while a new Poleglass ward was created within the DEA. It was abolished for the 2014 local elections with Derryaghy also moving to Lisburn North DEA and the rest of the area was transferred to the new Collin DEA for the 2014 Belfast City Council election.

== Councillors ==
Election	Councillor (Party)	Councillor (Party)	Councillor (Party)	Councillor (Party)	Councillor (Party)	Councillor (Party)	Councillor (Party)
2011	David Bell (Sinn Féin)	Arder Carson (Sinn Féin)	Stephen Magennis (Sinn Féin)	Angela Nelson (Sinn Féin)	Charlene O'Hara (Sinn Féin)	Brian Heading (SDLP)	Margaret Tolerton (DUP)
2005	Paul Butler (Sinn Féin)	Michael Ferguson (Sinn Féin)	Veronica Willis (Sinn Féin)	Angela Nelson (Sinn Féin)	Patricia Lewsley (SDLP)	Brian Heading (SDLP)	Stephen Moore (DUP)
2001	Paul Butler (Sinn Féin)	Michael Ferguson (Sinn Féin)	Veronica Willis (Sinn Féin)	Sue Ramsey (Sinn Féin)	Patricia Lewsley (SDLP)	William McDonnell (SDLP)	Billy Bell (UUP)
1997	Paul Butler (Sinn Féin)	Michael Ferguson (Sinn Féin)	Ita Gray (Sinn Féin)	Sue Ramsey (Sinn Féin)	Hugh Lewsley (Independent Nationalist)/ (SDLP)	William McDonnell (SDLP)	Billy Bell (UUP)
1993	Patrick Rice (Sinn Féin)	Michael Ferguson (Sinn Féin)	Anne Marie Armstrong (Sinn Féin)	William McAllister (UUP)	Hugh Lewsley (Independent Nationalist)/ (SDLP)	William McDonnell (SDLP)	Billy Bell (UUP)
1989	Patrick Rice (Sinn Féin)	Michael Ferguson (Sinn Féin)	William Beattie (DUP)	William McAllister (UUP)	Hugh Lewsley (Independent Nationalist)/ (SDLP)	William McDonnell (SDLP)	Billy Bell (UUP)
1985	Patrick Rice (Sinn Féin)	Damien Gibney (Sinn Féin)	William Beattie (DUP)	William McAllister (UUP)	Donald Cheyne (Alliance)	William McDonnell (SDLP)	Richard Scott (UUP)

== 2011 Election ==
2005: 4 x Sinn Féin, 2 x SDLP, 1 x DUP

2011: 5 x Sinn Féin, 1 x SDLP, 1 x DUP

2005-2011 Change: Sinn Féin gain from SDLP

Dunmurry Cross - 7 seats
Party	Candidate	FPv%	Count						
Party	Candidate	FPv%	1	2	3	4	5	6	7
Sinn Féin	David Bell	17.19%	1,796						
Sinn Féin	Charlene O'Hara	13.07%	1,365						
Sinn Féin	Arder Carson	12.81%	1,338						
Sinn Féin	Stephen Magennis	11.02%	1,151	1,553.57					
Sinn Féin	Angela Nelson*	11.58%	1,210	1,249.96	1,479.24				
DUP	Margaret Tolerton	10.84%	1,132	1,132.81	1,133.45	1,134.41	1,357.41		
SDLP	Brian Heading*	9.77%	1,020	1,041.6	1,043.68	1,052.32	1,059.32	1,079.9	1,272.03
SDLP	Matthew McDermott	6.02%	629	637.64	639.08	646.44	653.71	684.79	843.54
Alliance	Aaron McIntyre	4.38%	458	459.89	460.53	462.45	533.61	539.91	
UUP	Mark Hill	3.31%	346	346.81	346.81	346.97			
Electorate: 19,745 Valid: 10,445 (52.90%) Spoilt: 251 Quota: 1,306 Turnout: 10,696 (54.17%)

== 2005 Election ==
2001: 4 x Sinn Féin, 2 x SDLP, 1 x UUP

2005: 4 x Sinn Féin, 2 x SDLP, 1 x DUP

2001-2005 Change: DUP gain from UUP

Dunmurry Cross - 7 seats
Party	Candidate	FPv%	Count				
Party	Candidate	FPv%	1	2	3	4	5
Sinn Féin	Paul Butler*	17.12%	1,823				
Sinn Féin	Michael Ferguson*	13.75%	1,464				
DUP	Stephen Moore	13.08%	1,393				
SDLP	Patricia Lewsley*	12.86%	1,369				
SDLP	Brian Heading	7.83%	834	898.12	909.82	1,268.31	1,326.81
Sinn Féin	Angela Nelson	9.48%	1,010	1,196.2	1,220.86	1,229.22	1,229.97
Sinn Féin	Veronica Willis*	8.83%	940	1,142.72	1,222.01	1,222.01	1,222.01
Sinn Féin	Máireád Uí Adhmaill	10.56%	1,125	1,157.48	1,167.11	1,168.11	1,168.11
UUP	Kenneth Bishop	6.49%	691	693.52	694.33		
Electorate: 17,676 Valid: 10,649 (60.25%) Spoilt: 309 Quota: 1,332 Turnout: 10,958 (61.99%)

== 2001 Election ==
1997: 4 x Sinn Féin, 1 x SDLP, 1 x UUP, 1 x Independent

2001: 4 x Sinn Féin, 2 x SDLP, 1 x DUP

1997-2001 Change: SDLP gain from Independent

Dunmurry Cross - 7 seats
Party	Candidate	FPv%	Count					
Party	Candidate	FPv%	1	2	3	4	5	6
Sinn Féin	Paul Butler*	17.78%	2,061					
SDLP	Patricia Lewsley	17.50%	2,029					
UUP	Billy Bell*	13.37%	1,550					
Sinn Féin	Michael Ferguson*	13.36%	1,549					
Sinn Féin	Sue Ramsey*	10.52%	1,219	1,306.6	1,321.6	1,333.3	1,333.58	1,599.38
Sinn Féin	Veronica Willis*	8.57%	993	1,007.1	1,012.5	1,017.1	1,017.17	1,470.27
SDLP	William McDonnell*	5.52%	640	682.9	1,191.4	1,334.4	1,346.02	1,459.12
DUP	Stephen Moore	7.85%	910	910.6	912.4	930.7	1,008.61	1,008.61
Sinn Féin	Paul Flynn	3.64%	422	866.6	885.8	896.6	897.02	
Independent	Malachy McAnespie	1.88%	218	225.5	254.3			
Electorate: 18,673 Valid: 11,591 (62.07%) Spoilt: 440 Quota: 1,449 Turnout: 12,031 (64.43%)

== 1997 Election ==
1993: 3 x Sinn Féin, 2 x UUP, 2 x SDLP

1997: 4 x Sinn Féin, 1 x SDLP, 1 x UUP, 1 x Independent Nationalist

1993-1997 Change: Sinn Féin gain from UUP, Independent Nationalist leaves SDLP

Dunmurry Cross - 7 seats
Party	Candidate	FPv%	Count											
Party	Candidate	FPv%	1	2	3	4	5	6	7	8	9	10	11	12
Sinn Féin	Michael Ferguson*	15.45%	1,365											
Sinn Féin	Paul Butler	14.26%	1,260											
Sinn Féin	Sue Ramsey	11.60%	1,025	1,061.86	1,146.94									
UUP	Billy Bell*	10.90%	963	963.57	963.69	966.89	1,095.69	1,173.69						
SDLP	William McDonnell*	10.50%	928	933.89	937.73	1,006.16	1,006.16	1,064.35	1,066.35	1,071.35	1,480.35			
Sinn Féin	Ita Gray	8.79%	777	982.01	1,038.41	1,044.41	1,045.6	1,045.91	1,046.91	1,046.91	1,060.39	1,098.39	1,139.73	
Ind. Nationalist	Hugh Lewsley*	5.68%	502	504.85	507.01	542.01	543.01	600.01	607.01	610.01	690.94	959.94	960.24	966.3
UUP	Frederick Parkinson	5.36%	474	474	474	475	523	545	888	945	948	949	949	949.12
SDLP	Mary Rodgers	5.67%	501	502.52	504.08	517.46	517.46	541.46	542.46	542.46				
UUP	Andrew Park	3.73%	330	330	330.12	330.12	381.12	406.12						
Alliance	Owen Gawith	3.21%	284	284.76	284.88	298.88	301							
DUP	Yvonne Craig	2.67%	236	236.19	236.31	236.31								
Workers' Party	Frances McCarthy	1.88%	192	192.76	193									
Electorate: 18,255 Valid: 8,837 (48.41%) Spoilt: 194 Quota: 1,105 Turnout: 9,031 (49.47%)

== 1993 Election ==
1989: 2 x Sinn Féin, 2 x UUP, 2 x SDLP, 1 x DUP

1993: 3 x Sinn Féin, 2 x UUP, 2 x SDLP

1989-1993 Change: Sinn Féin gain from DUP

Dunmurry Cross - 7 seats
Party	Candidate	FPv%	Count							
Party	Candidate	FPv%	1	2	3	4	5	6	7	8
Sinn Féin	Patrick Rice*	16.83%	1,417							
UUP	William McAllister*	15.02%	1,265							
SDLP	Hugh Lewsley*	12.78%	1,076							
Sinn Féin	Michael Ferguson*	11.16%	940	1,215.34						
UUP	Billy Bell*	7.43%	626	626	797.36	797.51	812.7	812.76	818.76	1,244.76
Sinn Féin	Anne Marie Armstrong	9.28%	781	841.58	841.58	994.13	1,011.65	1,012.37	1,041.14	1,041.31
SDLP	William McDonnell*	8.25%	695	707.22	707.56	710.11	816.04	833.72	1,035.6	1,037.6
Alliance	Elizabeth Campbell	5.07%	427	428.04	432.97	433.12	504.8	505.72	592.1	611.39
DUP	Jonathan Craig	5.50%	463	463	492.24	492.24	497.75	497.77	502.11	
Workers' Party	Anne-Marie Lowry	5.33%	449	453.16	453.84	454.29	491.63	492.83		
Independent	Peter McAnespie	3.34%	281	283.34	286.23	286.98				
Electorate: 16,184 Valid: 8,420 (52.03%) Spoilt: 307 Quota: 1,053 Turnout: 8,727 (53.92%)

== 1989 Election ==
1985: 2 x Sinn Féin, 2 x UUP, 1 x SDLP, 1 x DUP, 1 x Alliance

1989: 2 x Sinn Féin, 2 x UUP, 2 x SDLP, 1 x DUP

1985-1989 Change: SDLP gain from Alliance

Dunmurry Cross - 7 seats
Party	Candidate	FPv%	Count				
Party	Candidate	FPv%	1	2	3	4	5
Sinn Féin	Patrick Rice*	16.69%	1,498				
UUP	William McAllister*	12.91%	1,159				
UUP	Billy Bell	10.66%	957	1,145			
Sinn Féin	Michael Ferguson	11.98%	1,075	1,075	1,421.06		
DUP	William Beattie*	10.74%	964	1,005	1,005	1,007.28	1,123.28
SDLP	William McDonnell*	9.12%	819	819	835.12	1,000.04	1,086.84
SDLP	Hugh Lewsley	9.00%	808	808	813.2	882.36	1,068.66
Workers' Party	John Lowry	8.48%	761	764	768.16	808.44	972.7
Alliance	Patrick Bell	7.62%	684	698	698.52	719.8	
UUP	Richard Scott*	2.81%	252				
Electorate: 16,626 Valid: 8,977 (53.99%) Spoilt: 337 Quota: 1,123 Turnout: 9,314 (56.02%)

== 1985 Election ==
1985: 2 x Sinn Féin, 2 x UUP, 1 x SDLP, 1 x DUP, 1 x Alliance

Dunmurry Cross - 7 seats
Party	Candidate	FPv%	Count					
Party	Candidate	FPv%	1	2	3	4	5	6
UUP	William McAllister*	22.98%	1,886					
DUP	William Beattie*	16.49%	1,353					
SDLP	William McDonnell*	13.32%	1,093					
Sinn Féin	Damien Gibney	12.78%	1,049					
UUP	Richard Scott	3.64%	299	904.82	962.66	1,033.66		
Alliance	Donald Cheyne	7.77%	638	657.32	664.76	672.8	704.54	1,002.26
Sinn Féin	Patrick Rice	10.04%	824	825.84	826.08	827.08	835.96	908.5
UUP	Norman Tulip	4.22%	346	514.82	536.18	791.06	791.12	802.8
Workers' Party	John Lowry	7.12%	584	590.44	591.64	594.36	611.76	
DUP	Ronald Kelly	1.64%	135	188.82	420.42			
Electorate: 14,907 Valid: 8,207 (55.05%) Spoilt: 216 Quota: 1,026 Turnout: 8,423 (56.50%)
