= Paul Butler (politician) =

Northern Irish politician (1956/1957–2026)

Member of the Northern Ireland Assembly for Lagan Valley
- In office 7 March 2007 – 5 May 2011
- Preceded by: Marietta Farrell
- Succeeded by: Brenda Hale

Member of Lisburn City Council
- In office 21 May 1997 – 5 May 2011
- Preceded by: Patrick Rice
- Succeeded by: David Bell
- Constituency: Dunmurry Cross

Personal details
- Born: 1956 or 1957 Lisburn, Northern Ireland
- Died: 23 September 2026
- Party: Sinn Féin
- Website: Sinn Féin

Paul Butler (Irish: Pól de Buitléir; 1956 or 1957 – 23 September 2026) was an Irish republican politician in Northern Ireland. He was a member of the Provisional Irish Republican Army, and served 15 years in prison after being convicted of murdering a police officer. Butler served as a member of the Northern Ireland Assembly for Lagan Valley from 2007 to 2011.

== Involvement in the Troubles ==
In 1974, aged 17, Butler confessed to, and was convicted of, the murder of 50-year-old reserve Royal Ulster Constabulary officer John Rodgers. Rodgers was murdered in an IRA gun attack near the Glen Inn in Glengormley. Butler was given a life sentence, for which he spent 15 years in jail.

== Lisburn City Council ==
Butler was the leader of the Sinn Féin group on the Lisburn City Council. The party held four seats on the council at the time, making it the third party and the largest nationalist party. Butler had a served as a Councillor for Lisburn City Council from 1997 until 2011 and was a member of their Strategic Policy, Planning and Finance Committees. Butler campaigned against discrimination on the council, culminating in the Irish Government sending a representative to witness council proceedings. Nationalists claim that the unionist majority on the council has prevented nationalists from taking council positions. Butler successfully campaigned for the town to gain city status.

== Westminster elections ==
Butler stood in the UK general elections in 2001 and 2005 in the Lagan Valley constituency but was not elected.

In October 2023, he called on Sinn Féin and the SDLP to not stand a candidate in Lagan Valley in the 2024 general election.

== Standing down ==
Butler announced that he would not contest the May 2011 Assembly elections after only one term as an MLA. "I am standing down," confirmed Butler. "The Party's position on this is that anyone who is a councillor and an MLA should only have one job."

== Death ==
Butler died suddenly on 23 September 2026.

== Assembly elections ==
=== Results of the election to the Northern Irish Assembly, Lagan Valley, 2003 ===
Party	Candidate	1st Pref	Result
UUP	Jeffrey Donaldson	14,104	Elected
DUP	Edwin Poots	5,175	Elected
Alliance	Seamus Close	4,408	Elected
DUP	Andrew Hunter	3,300	Not Elected
Sinn Féin	Paul Butler	3,242	Not Elected
SDLP	Patricia Lewsley*	3,133	Elected
UUP	Billy Bell	2,782	Elected
Independent	Ivan Davis	2,223	Not elected
UUP	Norah Beare	1,508	Elected
UUP	Jim Kirkpatrick	675	Not elected
NI Conservatives	Joanne Johnston	395	Not elected
PUP	Andrew Park	212	Not elected
Workers' Party	Frances McCarthy	97	Not elected

- Patricia Lewsley was appointed as Children's Commissioner and was replaced as an MLA by Marietta Farrell

=== Results of the election to the Northern Irish Assembly, Lagan Valley, 2007 ===
Butler became the first Sinn Féin member for Lagan Valley in the Northern Irish Assembly. He won the SDLP seat previously held by Patricia Lewsley and subsequently Marietta Farrell. Butler was the only nationalist elected in the six-seater constituency.

Party	Candidate	1st Pref	Result	Count
DUP	Jeffrey Donaldson	9,793	Elected	1
Sinn Féin	Paul Butler	5,098	Elected	6
UUP	Basil McCrea	4,031	Elected	7
Alliance	Trevor Lunn	3,765	Elected	7
DUP	Jonathan Craig	3,471	Elected	8
DUP	Edwin Poots	3,457	Elected	9
DUP	Paul Givan	3,377	Not elected	9
SDLP	Marietta Farrell	2,839	Not elected	5
UUP	Billy Bell	2,599	Not elected	6
UUP	Ronnie Crawford	1,147	Not elected	4
Green	Michael Rogan	922	Not elected	4
UK Unionist	Robert McCartney	853	Not elected	3
NI Conservatives	Neil Johnston	387	Not elected	2
Workers' Party	John Magee	83	Not elected	2

== Notes and references ==
Northern Ireland Assembly
Preceded by Marietta Farrell	MLA for Lagan Valley; 2007–2011	Succeeded by Brenda Hale
