= Lisburn North (District Electoral Area) =

District electoral area in Northern Ireland

- Lisburn and Castlereagh City Council DEA constituency

Current constituency
- Created: 1993
- Seats: 7 (1993-2014); 6 (2014-)
- Councillors: Pat Catney (SDLP); Jonathan Craig (DUP); Gary Hynds (IND); Declan Lynch (SF); Nicola Parker (APNI); Nicholas Trimble (UUP)

Lisburn North DEA within Lisburn and Castlereagh

Lisburn Town North DEA (1993-2014) within Lisburn

Lisburn North is one of the seven district electoral areas (DEA) in Lisburn and Castlereagh, Northern Ireland. The district elects six members to Lisburn and Castlereagh City Council and contains the wards of Derryaghy, Harmony Hill, Hilden, Lambeg, Magheralave and Wallace Park. Lisburn North forms parts of the Lagan Valley and Belfast West constituencies for the Northern Ireland Assembly and UK Parliament.

It was created for the 1993 local elections, largely replacing the old Lisburn Town DEA and gaining areas from Killultagh DEA, where it contained seven wards (Ballymacash, Ballymacoss, Harmony Hill, Lambeg, Lisnagarvey, Magheralave and Wallace Park), and was known as Lisburn Town North. For the 2014 local elections, it was decreased to six wards, losing Ballymacash, Ballymacoss and Lisnagarvey to Lisburn South DEA but gaining Hilden from Lisburn South DEA and Derryaghy from Dunmurry Cross DEA.

== Councillors ==
Election	Councillor (Party)	Councillor (Party)	Councillor (Party)	Councillor (Party)	Councillor (Party)	Councillor (Party)	Councillor (Party)
November 2024 Co-Option	Nicola Parker (Alliance)	Pat Catney (SDLP)	Declan Lynch (Sinn Féin)	Nicholas Trimble (UUP)	Jonathan Craig (DUP)	Gary Hynds (Independent)	7 seats 2014-present
2023	Nicola Parker (Alliance)	Pat Catney (SDLP)	Paul Burke (Sinn Féin)	Nicholas Trimble (UUP)	Jonathan Craig (DUP)	Gary Hynds (Independent)	7 seats 2014-present
2019	Stephen Martin (Alliance)	Johnny McCarthy (SDLP)/ (Independent)/ (NI21)	Stuart Hughes (UUP)	Nicholas Trimble (UUP)	Jonathan Craig (DUP)	Scott Carson (DUP)	7 seats 2014-present
June 2016 Co-Option	Stephen Martin (Alliance)	Johnny McCarthy (SDLP)/ (Independent)/ (NI21)	Brian Bloomfield (UUP)	Margaret Tolerton (DUP)	Jonathan Craig (DUP)	Scott Carson (DUP)	7 seats 2014-present
February 2016 Defection	Stephen Martin (Alliance)	Johnny McCarthy (SDLP)/ (Independent)/ (NI21)	Brian Bloomfield (UUP)	Margaret Tolerton (DUP)	Jenny Palmer (UUP)/ (DUP)	Scott Carson (DUP)	7 seats 2014-present
December 2015 Defection	Stephen Martin (Alliance)	Johnny McCarthy (SDLP)/ (Independent)/ (NI21)	Brian Bloomfield (UUP)	Margaret Tolerton (DUP)	Jenny Palmer (UUP)/ (DUP)	Scott Carson (DUP)	7 seats 2014-present
September 2015 Defection	Stephen Martin (Alliance)	Johnny McCarthy (SDLP)/ (Independent)/ (NI21)	Brian Bloomfield (UUP)	Margaret Tolerton (DUP)	Jenny Palmer (UUP)/ (DUP)	Scott Carson (DUP)	7 seats 2014-present
2014	Stephen Martin (Alliance)	Johnny McCarthy (SDLP)/ (Independent)/ (NI21)	Brian Bloomfield (UUP)	Margaret Tolerton (DUP)	Jenny Palmer (UUP)/ (DUP)	Scott Carson (DUP)	7 seats 2014-present
2011	Brian Doran (Alliance)	John Drake (SDLP)	Brian Bloomfield (UUP)	Paul Givan (DUP)	Jonathan Craig (DUP)	William Leathem (DUP)	Ronnie Crawford (UUP)/ (Independent Unionist)
2005	Trevor Lunn (Alliance)	David Archer (UUP)	William Gardiner-Watson (UUP)	Paul Givan (DUP)	Jonathan Craig (DUP)	William Leathem (DUP)	Ronnie Crawford (UUP)/ (Independent Unionist)
2001	Trevor Lunn (Alliance)	David Archer (UUP)	William Gardiner-Watson (UUP)	William Lewis (UUP)	Jonathan Craig (DUP)	Lorraine Martin (UUP)	Ronnie Crawford (UUP)/ (Independent Unionist)
1997	Frazer McCammond (Alliance)	David Adams (UDP)	William Gardiner-Watson (UUP)	William Lewis (UUP)	William Beattie (DUP)/ (Protestant Unionist)	Lorraine Martin (UUP)	Ronnie Crawford (UUP)/ (Independent Unionist)
1993	Frazer McCammond (Alliance)	Samuel Semple (UUP)	William Gardiner-Watson (UUP)	William Lewis (UUP)	William Beattie (DUP)/ (Protestant Unionist)	Lorraine Martin (UUP)	Ronnie Crawford (UUP)/ (Independent Unionist)

== 2023 Election ==
2019: 2 x DUP, 2 x UUP, 1 x Alliance, 1 x SDLP

2023: 1 x DUP, 1 x Alliance, 1 x Sinn Féin, 1 x UUP, 1 x SDLP, 1 x Independent

2019–2023 Change: Sinn Féin and Independent gain from DUP and UUP

Lisburn North - 6 seats
Party	Candidate	FPv%	Count				
Party	Candidate	FPv%	1	2	3	4	5
Sinn Féin	Paul Burke †	14.67%	1,239				
DUP	Jonathan Craig*	14.45%	1,220				
Alliance	Nicola Parker	13.47%	1,137	1,147	1,900		
SDLP	Pat Catney	11.07%	935	941	1,002	1,360	
UUP	Nicholas Trimble*	7.43%	627	1,035	1,070	1,242	
Independent	Gary Hynds	10.54%	890	933	946	1,045	1,162
DUP	Scott Carson*	12.02%	1,015	1,049	1,053	1,066	1,071
Alliance	Stephen Martin*	10.14%	856	874			
UUP	Linsey Gibson	6.22%	525				
Electorate: 16,680 Valid: 8,444 (50.62%) Spoilt: 89 Quota: 1,207 Turnout: 8,553 (51.28%)

== 2019 Election ==
2014: 3 x DUP, 1 x UUP, 1 x Alliance, 1 x NI21

2019: 2 x DUP, 2 x UUP, 1 x Alliance, 1 x SDLP

2014-2019 Change: UUP gain from DUP, NI21 joins SDLP

Lisburn North - 6 seats
Party	Candidate	FPv%	Count						
Party	Candidate	FPv%	1	2	3	4	5	6	7
Alliance	Stephen Martin*	20.25%	1,483						
DUP	Jonathan Craig*	16.21%	1,187						
SDLP	Johnny McCarthy*	11.63%	852	1,100.62					
DUP	Scott Carson*	11.55%	846	856.56	883.2	951.51	951.81	1,060.81	
UUP	Nicholas Trimble*	9.82%	719	786.52	808.52	812.04	824.64	950.14	1,077.14
UUP	Stuart Hughes	7.89%	578	619.92	659.56	665.72	673.32	789.61	1,058.61
Sinn Féin	Joe Duffy	8.93%	654	680.24	685.88	686.43	710.13	716.13	717.13
DUP	Lindsay Reynolds	5.80%	425	429.8	449.12	497.19	497.99	559.04	
NI Conservatives	Gary Hynds	5.78%	423	443.8	467.72	469.7	475.1		
UKIP	Alan Love	2.13%	156	162.08					
Electorate: 15,356 Valid: 7,323 (47.69%) Spoilt: 89 Quota: 1,047 Turnout: 7,412 (48.27%)

== 2014 Election ==
This election was carried out under new ward boundaries, as a result of local government reform.

2011: 3 x DUP, 2 x UUP, 1 x Alliance, 1 x SDLP

2014: 3 x DUP, 1 x UUP, 1 x Alliance, 1 x NI21

2011-2014 Change: UUP and SDLP loss to NI21 and due to the reduction of one seat

Lisburn North - 6 seats
Party	Candidate	FPv%	Count									
Party	Candidate	FPv%	1	2	3	4	5	6	7	8	9	10
UUP	Brian Bloomfield*	15.51%	1,026									
Alliance	Stephen Martin*	10.75%	711	720	729.28	731.68	755	760.72	968.72			
DUP	Scott Carson*	10.34%	684	685	703.24	749.32	756.56	831.04	833.2	939.04	946.04	
DUP	Margaret Tolerton*	11.11%	735	735	743	779.16	785.24	823.2	828.2	886.6	889.68	889.97
NI21	Johnny McCarthy ‡‡	4.97%	329	340	343.68	348.76	516.64	524.36	587.52	656.56	838.56	859.44
DUP	Jenny Palmer* ‡†	8.07%	534	534	541.36	554.76	556.84	599.12	605.28	670.76	671.76	672.63
DUP	Yvonne Craig*	7.95%	526	527	535.8	554.28	558.36	597.08	598.16	664.04	669.04	669.33
Sinn Féin	Jacqui McGeough	7.45%	493	493	493	493	498	498	627	630.08		
UKIP	Alan Love	5.12%	339	341	345.72	378.12	380.36	500.04	511.12			
SDLP	Nicola Turtle	7.04%	466	469	470.2	470.28	483.28	484.36				
TUV	John McCall	4.53%	300	301	310.44	348.48	353.56					
NI21	Colin McCord	3.58%	237	241	243.16	243.16						
PUP	Matt Brennan	3.07%	203	203	208.44							
Independent	Jonny Orr	0.50%	33									
Electorate: 14,284 Valid: 6,616 (46.32%) Spoilt: 109 Quota: 946 Turnout: 6,725 (47.08%)

== 2011 Election ==
2005: 3 x DUP, 3 x UUP, 1 x Alliance

2011: 3 x DUP, 2 x UUP, 1 x Alliance, 1 x SDLP

2005-2011 Change: SDLP gain from UUP

Lisburn Town North - 7 seats
Party	Candidate	FPv%	Count							
Party	Candidate	FPv%	1	2	3	4	5	6	7	8
DUP	Paul Givan*	16.68%	1,528							
DUP	Jonathan Craig*	16.17%	1,481							
Alliance	Brian Doran	14.03%	1,285							
DUP	William Leathem*	9.71%	889	1,164						
UUP	Ronnie Crawford*	10.52%	963	986.25	1,012.17	1,033.77	1,119.77	1,148.77		
UUP	Brian Bloomfield	6.79%	622	630.75	642.27	661.47	681.68	705.96	708.96	1,150.96
SDLP	John Drake	5.78%	529	531	533.4	566.4	567.88	667.21	1,016.97	1,035.53
DUP	Ben Mallon	5.25%	481	518.25	784.89	794.13	799.98	814.5	825.98	914.14
UUP	David Archer*	5.91%	541	555.75	571.59	583.11	629.15	656.63	660.87	
Sinn Féin	Terry Quinn	4.50%	412	412.25	413.21	416.21	416.21	443.65		
Green (NI)	Connor Quinn	2.87%	263	265.25	267.41	302.69	306.93			
UUP	Neil McNickle	1.79%	164	169.5	172.38	177.54				
Electorate: 17,438 Valid: 9,158 (52.52%) Spoilt: 127 Quota: 1,145 Turnout: 9,285 (53.24%)

== 2005 Election ==
2001: 4 x UUP, 1 x Alliance, 1 x DUP, 1 x Independent

2005: 3 x DUP, 3 x UUP, 1 x Alliance

2001-2005 Change: DUP (two seats) gain from UUP and Independent

Lisburn Town North - 7 seats
Party	Candidate	FPv%	Count									
Party	Candidate	FPv%	1	2	3	4	5	6	7	8	9	10
DUP	Jonathan Craig*	18.33%	1,794									
DUP	Paul Givan	15.39%	1,506									
DUP	William Leathem	10.87%	1,064	1,556.8								
Alliance	Trevor Lunn*	11.04%	1,080	1,083.84	1,099.84	1,120.36	1,250.36					
UUP	Ronnie Crawford*	7.76%	759	777.88	817.24	869.89	875.24	877.24	908.28	1,035.81	1,039.41	1,097.37
UUP	David Archer*	6.58%	644	660.64	796.32	864.63	867.22	867.22	894.13	983.37	986.49	1,068.57
UUP	William Gardiner-Watson*	6.93%	678	687.6	720.88	757.06	762.7	762.7	782.47	922.54	930.94	1,006.73
UUP	Kenneth Armstrong	6.61%	647	662.04	701.08	752.38	753.24	754.56	778.19	871.86	875.94	920.08
SDLP	John Drake	5.80%	568	569.28	573.44	575.33	580.6	763.6	852.92	866.46	873.42	
UUP	Ellen Hillen	3.87%	379	385.08	415.48	448.42	452.69	452.69	502.98			
Green (NI)	Michael Rogan	2.90%	284	286.56	300.32	314.9	323.49	343.49				
Sinn Féin	Jacqui Currie	2.27%	222	222.32	222.96	222.96	222.96					
Alliance	Frazer McCammond	1.64%	160	160.64	162.24	165.48						
Electorate: 16,325 Valid: 9,785 (59.94%) Spoilt: 199 Quota: 1,224 Turnout: 9,984 (61.16%)

== 2001 Election ==
1997: 3 x UUP, 1 x Alliance, 1 x UDP, 1 x Independent Unionist, 1 x Protestant Unionist

2001: 4 x UUP, 1 x Alliance, 1 x DUP, 1 x Independent

1997-2001 Change: UUP and DUP gain from UDP and Protestant Unionist, Independent Unionist becomes Independent

Lisburn Town North - 7 seats
Party	Candidate	FPv%	Count						
Party	Candidate	FPv%	1	2	3	4	5	6	7
Alliance	Trevor Lunn	17.66%	1,903						
UUP	David Archer	15.03%	1,619						
UUP	William Gardiner-Watson*	11.05%	1,190	1,276.76	1,377.06				
UUP	William Lewis*	10.98%	1,183	1,276.6	1,328.11	1,353.11			
DUP	Jonathan Craig	9.62%	1,036	1,039.96	1,062.74	1,070.44	1,203.84	1,205.84	1,341.73
UUP	Lorraine Martin*	6.95%	749	832.88	872.32	902	973.56	1,036.48	1,246.49
Independent	Ronnie Crawford*	6.60%	711	761.4	769.39	820.72	906.58	954.3	1,125.05
DUP	William Leathem	7.50%	808	817	843.35	847.52	923.39	926.75	991.34
Independent	David Adams*	5.36%	577	624.16	631.47	647.52	700.83	790.03	
Sinn Féin	James Armstrong	4.19%	451	557.92	557.92	563.24	564.6		
Independent	William Beattie*	3.93%	423	443.16	455.74	470.79			
Independent	Adrian Creighton	2.90%	123	176.64	178.51				
Electorate: 17,506 Valid: 10,773 (61.54%) Spoilt: 167 Quota: 1,347 Turnout: 10,940 (62.49%)

== 1997 Election ==
1993: 4 x UUP, 1 x Alliance, 1 x DUP, 1 x Independent Unionist

1997: 3 x UUP, 1 x Alliance, 1 x UDP, 1 x Independent Unionist, 1 x Protestant Unionist

1993-1997 Change: UDP gain from UUP, Protestant Unionist leaves DUP

Lisburn Town North - 7 seats
Party	Candidate	FPv%	Count								
Party	Candidate	FPv%	1	2	3	4	5	6	7	8	9
UUP	William Lewis*	17.39%	1,237								
Alliance	Frazer McCammond*	13.37%	951								
Ind. Unionist	Ronnie Crawford*	11.39%	810	838	844.56	850.52	852.08	1,027.08			
UUP	William Gardiner-Watson*	9.17%	652	751.12	764.52	798.12	799.14	809.5	857.34	870.8	932.8
Ulster Democratic	David Adams	10.52%	748	758.92	760.92	765.2	765.56	774.46	798.38	827.34	892.34
Protestant Unionist	William Beattie*	9.43%	671	692.28	697.56	702.12	702.3	724.04	735.08	760.92	788.74
UUP	Lorraine Martin*	5.74%	408	476.32	483.32	596.52	597	613.74	637.66	663.98	760.34
DUP	Eleanor Calvert	5.64%	401	408.56	412.84	415.52	415.7	433.7	440.14	645.82	656.72
Alliance	William Whitley	6.96%	495	503.4	531.68	535.52	587.06	602.46	622.79	627.66	
DUP	James Tinsley	4.13%	294	304.64	307.64	313.48	313.66	318.78	321.54		
Ind. Unionist	Anne Blake	3.63%	258	267.24	275.52	279.08	279.44				
UUP	Noel Malcolm	1.39%	99	172.36	181.2						
NI Conservatives	Leonard Jarvis	1.25%	89	92.92							
Electorate: 17,508 Valid: 7,113 (40.63%) Spoilt: 111 Quota: 890 Turnout: 7,224 (41.26%)

== 1993 Election ==
1993: 4 x UUP, 1 x Alliance, 1 x DUP, 1 x Independent Unionist

Lisburn Town North - 7 seats
Party	Candidate	FPv%	Count									
Party	Candidate	FPv%	1	2	3	4	5	6	7	8	9	10
Ind. Unionist	Ronnie Crawford*	18.75%	1,394									
DUP	William Beattie*	17.03%	1,266									
UUP	William Gardiner-Watson*	8.16%	607	718.86	751.8	753.8	770.56	812.47	959.71			
UUP	Samuel Semple*	9.91%	737	791.4	822.99	823.26	867.9	903.06	951.22			
UUP	William Lewis*	9.71%	722	805.98	833.52	833.52	865	908.43	930.43			
Alliance	Frazer McCammond	9.68%	720	746.18	747.53	794.55	794.55	846.21	850.73	852.16	852.97	870.19
UUP	Lorraine Martin	4.55%	338	383.9	397.13	398.47	439.07	458.01	511.12	535.56	553.11	793.83
Alliance	William Whitley	8.22%	611	635.48	637.64	675.34	681.38	706.39	709.68	709.81	710.08	738.1
Ulster Democratic	Raymond Smallwoods	5.84%	434	452.36	469.1	470.1	487.88	492.49	544.38	546.2	548.63	
DUP	Josephine Challis	1.88%	140	177.4	363.43	364.43	375.95	392.44				
NI Conservatives	Leonard Jarvis	2.95%	219	250.96	259.33	263.33	266.16					
UUP	Andrew Park	1.98%	147	168.08	178.61	179.61						
Workers' Party	J. J. Magee	1.34%	100	103.06	103.6							
Electorate: 16,142 Valid: 7,435 (46.06%) Spoilt: 142 Quota: 930 Turnout: 7,577 (46.94%)
