= Housing Council =

The Housing Council is a public body in Northern Ireland, consulted by the Housing Executive and Department for Communities on all matters that affect housing policy in Northern Ireland.

The Council meets with the NIHE once a month to discuss strategy and operations. It is made up of one representative from each of the 11 district councils in Northern Ireland. Four members of the Housing Council members always sit on the Board of the Housing Executive.
