= David Adams (loyalist) =

Northern Irish activist

Member of Lisburn Borough Council
- In office 21 May 1997 – 7 June 2001
- Preceded by: Samuel Semple
- Succeeded by: David Archer
- Constituency: Lisburn Town North

Personal details
- Born: 1953 (age 72–73) Lisburn, Northern Ireland
- Party: UDP (until 2001)
- Other political affiliations: Independent (2001)

David Adams (born c. 1953) is a Northern Irish loyalist activist and former politician. He was instrumental in bringing about the loyalist ceasefire of 1994 and played a leading role in the early stages of the Northern Ireland peace process.

== Emergence in politics ==
A native of Lisburn, Adams was a member of the Ulster Defence Association (UDA) although he did not hold any position of importance within the movement and was never imprisoned. From early on, Adams was much more involved in the political side of loyalism rather than the paramilitary side. Unlike many of his contemporaries in the UDA, Adams was grammar school educated and gained a reputation as an articulate speaker. Adams, who lived near the Maze Prison and served as a community worker in the area, joined the Ulster Democratic Party (UDP) after being encouraged to do so by Ray Smallwoods.

== Towards ceasefire ==
Adams was, along with Gary McMichael, involved in negotiations between the UDP and the UDA during the early 1990s in which the possibility of a move towards a peace settlement was discussed. The main figure in these talks however was Ray Smallwoods. Adams became a representative to the Combined Loyalist Political Alliance, a semi-clandestine group established around sometime in late 1992 to early 1993 and made up of leading members of the UDP and the Progressive Unionist Party (PUP), when this initiative was established. This group was central to delivering the loyalist ceasefires.

Adams was close to Ray Smallwoods personally and described himself as "really devastated" following Smallwoods' killing by the Provisional IRA in July 1994. He identified Smallwoods as his mentor in heping to bring him to politics. Nonetheless Adams continued to work towards delivering a ceasefire and was described by Henry McDonald and Jim Cusack as "one of the moderate voices advising the UDA, even in the darkest days".

== Ceasefire aftermath ==
The Combined Loyalist Military Command (CLMC) ceasefire was announced on 13 October 1994 at Fernhill House, Glencairn when Gusty Spence read out a joint statement of ceasefire flanked by McMichael, Adams and John White of the UDP and Jim McDonald and William "Plum" Smith of the PUP. Although the speech had largely been written by Spence, he credits Adams with including a clause stating that they expected the status of Northern Ireland as part of the United Kingdom to be safeguarded as part of any settlement. A few days after the announcement Adams joined Spence, McMichael, Joe English and the PUP's David Ervine and Billy Hutchinson on a tour of the United States where amongst their engagements was one as guests of honour of the National Committee on American Foreign Policy.

In the late 1990s Adams also represented the UDP on Lisburn Borough Council. He had been a candidate in the 1993 elections in the Downshire area but had finished bottom of the poll. However, in 1997 as candidate in Lisburn Town North Adams was elected. In the meantime, he had been an unsuccessful candidate in the Northern Ireland Forum election in South Belfast.

== Departure from politics ==
On 7 January 1998 Adams travelled with McMichael to London where the two held a hastily arranged meeting with Northern Ireland Secretary Mo Mowlam. The recent killing of Loyalist Volunteer Force leader Billy Wright, who had a lot of support amongst elements of the UDA made the ceasefire shaky. As a result of the meeting Mowlam was convinced to go onto the UDA wings of the Maze prison in an attempt to regain support for the peace process. Disarray had set in however and by this point the UDA had two wings, those loyal to the ceasefire and the McMichael-Adams UDP leadership and those such as Stephen McKeag who were continuing to kill despite the ceasefire, with John White falling somewhere between both wings due to his close relationship with Johnny Adair.

Nonetheless Adams campaigned heavily on behalf of the UDP for the 1998 Assembly elections and described himself as "dejected and rejected" when the party failed to win any seats. Even an unidentified figure known only as "the Craftsman", who was at the time the Ulster Volunteer Force (UVF)'s second-in-command, stated that "I was gutted for wee Davy. Not only was he a gentleman but he had a good political brain. He could have kept the UDA on the straight and narrow if he had won an Assembly seat". Adams had been the party's sole candidate in the South Belfast constituency.

As the UDA ceasefire fell apart and the UDP passed from existence, Adams left politics and instead headed up a number of community projects in his native Lisburn. His last election was the 2001 local government vote in which Adams was unsuccessful in defending his council seat, albeit as an independent.

Adams joined the Lisburn District Policing Partnership in 2003 although this decision rankled with some in the local UDA who wanted nothing to do with the Police Service of Northern Ireland, which caused him to become a target for attack. Threats were issued against Adams and both his car and house came under attack. By this point Adams, along with Gary McMichael, had disavowed any connection to the UDA and the pair were targeted for intimidation as a consequence, with his car vandalised and hate mail sent to his home.

Adams worked for GOAL, an international aid agency. He retired in 2018.

In 2025 Adams announced he would vote in a border poll for a new shared Ireland.
