= Sue Ramsey =

Irish Republican politician

Sue Ramsey MLA
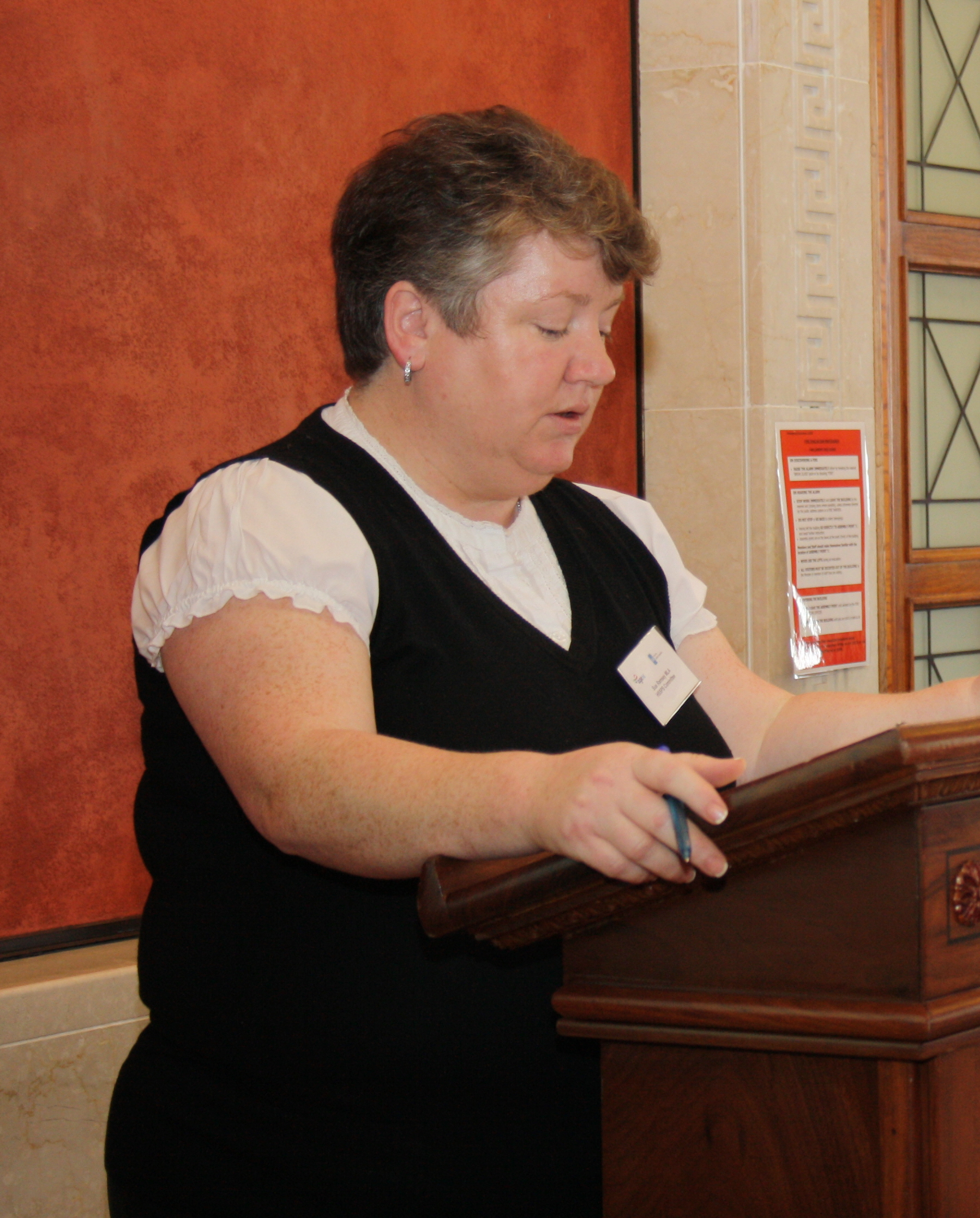
- Ramsey in 2012

Member of the Northern Ireland Assembly for Belfast West
- In office 13 June 2004 – 3 November 2014
- Preceded by: Bairbre de Brún
- Succeeded by: Alex Maskey
- In office 25 June 1998 – 26 November 2003
- Preceded by: New Creation
- Succeeded by: Michael Ferguson

Member of Lisburn City Council
- In office 21 May 1997 – 5 May 2005
- Preceded by: William McAllister
- Succeeded by: Angela Nelson
- Constituency: Dunmurry Cross

Personal details
- Born: 6 August 1970 (age 55) Springhill, Northern Ireland
- Party: Sinn Féin
- Website: Sue Ramsey MLA

Sue Ramsey (born 1970) is an Irish Sinn Féin former politician who was a Member of the Northern Ireland Assembly (MLA) for Belfast West from 1998 to 2003, and then again from 2004 to 2014.

== Early life and education ==
After growing up in Belfast, Ramsey studied catering. She represented the Poleglass and Twinbrook areas on Lisburn Borough Council from 1997 to 2005.

== Career ==
In 1996 she was an unsuccessful candidate in the Northern Ireland Forum election in Lagan Valley, and failed to be elected at the next year's UK general election also in Lagan Valley, where she finished 6th out of eight candidates. Ramsey was elected to the Northern Ireland Assembly in 1998 as a Sinn Féin member for West Belfast. She lost her seat at the 2003 election, when she finished 87 votes behind Diane Dodds of the DUP in the closest inter-party result of the election but returned to the Assembly in 2004 as a substitute for Bairbre de Brún. She was then re-elected in 2007 and 2011.

Regarding fire service in Northern Ireland, Ramsey said it was crucial that problems within the Northern Fire and Rescue Service 'need to be tackled as soon as possible’ and that it was ‘worrying that the Fire Service has been allowed to get into such a poor state of management'.

Northern Ireland Assembly
New assembly	MLA for Belfast West; 1998–2003	Succeeded by Michael Ferguson
Preceded by Bairbre de Brún	MLA for Belfast West; 2004–2014	Succeeded by Alex Maskey
