= Gary McMichael =

Northern Irish community activist

Leader of the Ulster Democratic Party
- In office 1994–2001
- Preceded by: Ray Smallwoods
- Succeeded by: Party abolished

Member of Lisburn City Council
- In office 19 May 1993 – 5 May 2005
- Preceded by: Seat created
- Succeeded by: Andrew Ewing
- Constituency: Lisburn Town South

Member of the Northern Ireland Forum
- In office 30 May 1996 – 25 April 1998
- Preceded by: Forum created
- Succeeded by: Forum dissolved
- Constituency: Top-up list

Personal details
- Born: June 1969 (age 56) Lisburn, Northern Ireland
- Party: Ulster Democratic Party (1988 - 2001)
- Other political affiliations: Independent (2001 - 2005)
- Parent(s): John McMichael; Phyllis McMichael
- Known for: Loyalist politician

Gary McMichael (born June 1969) is a Northern Ireland community activist, and retired politician. He was the leader of the short-lived Ulster Democratic Party (UDP) during the Northern Ireland peace process, and was instrumental in organizing the Loyalist ceasefire in the Troubles in 1994.

== Early years ==
McMichael is the eldest son of the John McMichael, a former leader of the Loyalist paramilitary Ulster Defence Association (UDA). He left school in his native Lisburn in 1985, and began working with the civil service, although he subsequently also worked as a youth worker and an insurance salesman.

He became involved in local protests against the Anglo-Irish Agreement soon after it was signed. McMichael joined the Lisburn Club, the local branch of the pan-unionist Ulster Clubs movement that his father had helped to establish, and for a while served as chairman of this branch. John McMichael was killed on 22 December 1987 and Gary McMichael was informed by police when a message to report to the front door was read out by Jake Burns, the lead singer of Stiff Little Fingers, at the Ulster Hall in Belfast, where he was attending a concert.

In 1988 McMichael became involved with the Ulster Loyalist Democratic Party (as the UDP was then known). He served as election co-ordinator for the group and helped to ensure the election of Ken Kerr to Derry City Council in 1989. He was the UDP candidate in the 1990 Upper Bann by-election, when he finished eighth with 600 votes in a contest won by David Trimble. Although he regularly gave political advice to the UDA's controlling Inner Council, he was never a member of the paramilitary organisation, concentrating solely on the political wing.

McMichael became a close ally of Ray Smallwoods, serving his political apprenticeship under the UDP chairman. Smallwoods was killed in 1994 and McMichael succeeded him as UDP leader. Although McMichael roundly condemned the killing of Smallwoods he later conceded that the shooting of Smallwoods, as well as that of Joe Bratty and Raymie Elder soon afterwards, convinced him that a Provisional IRA ceasefire was near as all three had been long-standing targets for the republican group.

== UDP leader ==
As leader of the UDP, McMichael became attached to the Combined Loyalist Military Command, and played a leading role in convincing the CLMC to call a ceasefire in October 1994. When the ceasefire was announced from Fernhill House in Glencairn, McMichael was one of the six, along with UDP colleagues John White and David Adams and Progressive Unionist Party leaders Gusty Spence, "Plum" Smith and Jim McDonald, who delivered the statement confirming the cessation. A few days later McMichael, along with Adams, Spence, Joe English, David Ervine and Billy Hutchinson, took part in a tour of the United States where they presented the loyalist case publicly to a number of bodies. McMichael in particular received widespread coverage after he said in a speech to the National Committee on American Foreign Policy that if the Provisional IRA ceasefire proved legitimate then it was imperative for unionist leaders to hold talks with Sinn Féin, something the Ulster Unionist Party and Democratic Unionist Party were refusing to countenance. He was also part of a loyalist delegation to 10 Downing Street in June 1996 aimed at avoiding the possibility of the cancellation of the CLMC ceasefire.

McMichael became a high-profile figure due to his involvement in the Northern Ireland peace process and he led the UDP into the Forum in 1996 from which the Belfast Agreement emerged. McMichael became an enthusiastic advocate of the Agreement, although his views were not always shared by the UDA membership as a whole and the party failed to win any seats in the Northern Ireland Assembly. McMichael himself stood in Lagan Valley and only failed to capture one of the six seats by a narrow margin.

Following the killing of Loyalist Volunteer Force leader Billy Wright in late 1997, McMichael held a personal meeting with Secretary of State for Northern Ireland Mo Mowlam in which he convinced her that, to avoid a breach of the ceasefire due to the popularity of Wright, they needed to engage with UDA prisoners. Mowlam herself, as well as McMichael, entered HMP Maze to meet with the paramilitary leaders and after extensive negotiations emerged with an undertaking that they would not sanction retaliation. McMichael, whose position was seen as weakened by some more hawkish members due to his own lack of a track record as a paramilitary, was supported in his efforts by Jackie McDonald, a leading figure within the UDA and close ally of John McMichael.

However, the guarantee was ignored by the UDA West Belfast Brigade, with Stephen McKeag carrying out several retaliatory murders in what proved a blow to McMichael's leadership. Sammy Duddy would later admit that UDA activity in the aftermath of Wright's killing was kept from McMichael and McMichael subsequently claimed that when he went to the Inner Council to appeal to them to respect the ceasefire they told him the UDA was not involved in any of the attacks, even though they were actually being carried out by UDA members.

== Leaving politics ==
Although still a local councillor, McMichael's influence began to wane after the failure of 1998 and with the movement of Johnny Adair towards the Loyalist Volunteer Force and the resulting loyalist feud, he became an increasingly peripheral figure along with the UDP as a whole. As elements within the UDA returned to violence in 1999, using the Red Hand Defenders cover name, McMichael was largely in the dark as to whether or not the UDA were involved. He entered virtual political retirement, concentrating instead on writing a column for Ireland on Sunday and publishing his autobiography, An Ulster Voice, in 1999. He did emerge briefly for negotiations with David Ervine aimed at ending the feuds, although these came to nothing. He was appointed to the Civic Forum for Northern Ireland, but McMichael's career in politics was effectively ended by the collapse of the UDP in 2001. McMichael did not take any role in the Ulster Political Research Group, which assumed the UDP's role as political arm of the UDA, albeit without being a political party. He continued to sit on Lisburn City Council as an independent and did not seek re-election in 2005. He is no longer involved in electoral politics.

In 1998 McMichael started a Lisburn-based Community Organisation, ASCERT – Action on Substances through Community Education and Related Training, aimed at addressing the drug and alcohol issues in the local communities. On retiring from politics McMichael became the full-time Director of ASCERT.

Party political offices
Preceded by Ray Smallwoods	Leader of the Ulster Democratic Party; 1994–2001	Party disbanded
Northern Ireland Forum
New forum	Regional Member; 1996–1998	Forum dissolved
