= Michael Ferguson (Irish politician) =

Irish politician

Member of the Northern Ireland Assembly for West Belfast
- In office 26 November 2003 – 24 September 2006
- Preceded by: Sue Ramsey
- Succeeded by: Paul Maskey

Member of Lisburn City Council
- In office 17 May 1989 – 24 September 2006
- Preceded by: Damien Gibney
- Succeeded by: Arder Carson
- Constituency: Dunmurry Cross

Personal details
- Born: 1953 Lisburn, Northern Ireland
- Died: 24 September 2006 (aged 52–53)
- Cause of death: Testicular cancer
- Party: Sinn Féin
- Education: Queen's University Belfast

Michael Ferguson (c. 1953 – 24 September 2006) was an Irish Sinn Féin politician who was a Member of the Legislative Assembly (MLA) for West Belfast from 2003 until 2006. Ferguson also served as a Lisburn City Councillor for Dunmurry Cross from 1989 to 2006.

== Politics and Life ==
Ferguson was convicted in 1975 of firearms offences, kidnapping and bank robbery. He held a bank manager and his family hostage aimed at raising funds for the INLA. Ferguson graduated from Queen's University Belfast in 1989 and became involved in politics. In 1989, Ferguson was elected as a Sinn Féin representative on Lisburn City Council. In 1996 he was an unsuccessful candidate in the Northern Ireland Forum election in Lagan Valley. In 2003, he was also elected to the Northern Ireland Assembly, to represent Belfast West.

== Illness and death ==
Ferguson died on 24 September 2006 from testicular cancer. He had spoken about the illness to the Belfast-based Irish News, saying "Men are neglectful of their own health and do not visit their doctors."

== Being Honoured ==
Local supporters and community workers renamed the Poleglass Roundabout on Belfast’s Stewartstown Road in honour of Sinn Féin activist and MLA Michael Ferguson. The renaming ceremony took place in the presence of the Ferguson family on the Thursday, 25 September, the second anniversary of the Sinn Féin Assembly member’s death.

Northern Ireland Assembly
Preceded by Sue Ramsey	MLA for Belfast West; 2003–2006	Succeeded by Paul Maskey
