= Billy Bell (politician) =

British politician (1935–2020)

Billy Bell OBE, JP
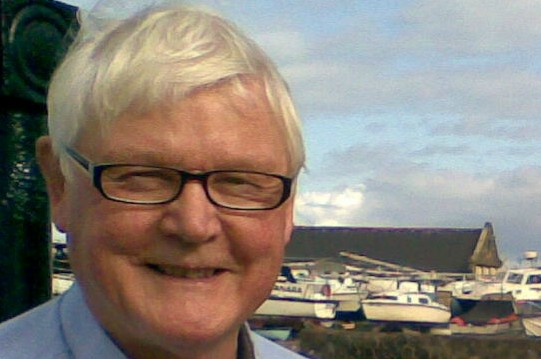

Member of the Northern Ireland Assembly for Lagan Valley
- In office 25 June 1998 – 7 March 2007
- Preceded by: New Creation
- Succeeded by: Basil McCrea

Member of Lisburn City Council
- In office 17 May 1989 – 5 May 2005
- Preceded by: Richard Scott
- Succeeded by: Stephen Moore
- Constituency: Dunmurry Cross

Member of the Northern Ireland Assembly for South Antrim
- In office 20 October 1982 – 1986

Lord Mayor of Belfast
- In office 1979–1980
- Preceded by: David Cook
- Succeeded by: John Carson

Member of Belfast City Council
- In office 18 May 1977 – 15 May 1985
- Preceded by: David Smylie
- Succeeded by: District abolished
- Constituency: Belfast Area E

Member of the Northern Ireland Constitutional Convention for Belfast North
- In office 1975–1976

Personal details
- Born: 9 October 1935 Belfast, Northern Ireland
- Died: 9 June 2020 (aged 84) Belfast, Northern Ireland
- Resting place: Dundonald Cemetery
- Party: Ulster Unionist Party
- Website: Profile, archive.org

William Bradshaw Bell, OBE, JP (9 October 1935 – 9 June 2020) was a Northern Irish Ulster Unionist Party (UUP) politician who served as Lord Mayor of Belfast. He was also a Member of the Northern Ireland Assembly (MLA) for Lagan Valley from 1998 to 2007.

== Life career ==
Bell served as a Councillor on Belfast City Council from 1976 to 1985 and was Lord Mayor of Belfast from 1979 to 1980. He also served on Lisburn Council (1989–2007) and was Mayor of the City of Lisburn in 2003.

He was Personal Assistant to MP Rt Hon Sir James Molyneaux from 1976 to 1997. He was elected to the Northern Ireland Constitutional Convention (1975–1976) for North Belfast, and to the Northern Ireland Assembly for the Lagan Valley constituency in 1998 and again in 2003. In 1996 he was an unsuccessful candidate in the Northern Ireland Forum election in Lagan Valley. Bell stood in the 2007 Assembly election after re-selection by his party. However, he lost his seat to fellow UUP candidate, Basil McCrea.

Bell was appointed a Justice of the peace in 1985, and was a member of the Northern Ireland Housing Council.

Bell died in Belfast on 9 June 2020, at the age of 84.

Northern Ireland Constitutional Convention
New convention	Member for North Belfast; 1975–1976	Convention abolished
Northern Ireland Assembly (1982)
New assembly	MPA for South Antrim; 1982–1986	Assembly abolished
Northern Ireland Assembly
New assembly	MLA for Lagan Valley; 1998–2007	Succeeded by Basil McCrea
Civic offices
Preceded by David Cook	Lord Mayor of Belfast; 1979–1980	Succeeded by John Carson
Preceded by Betty Campbell	Mayor of Lisburn; 2002–2003	Succeeded by Cecil Calvert
