= Jonathan Craig =

Northern Irish politician

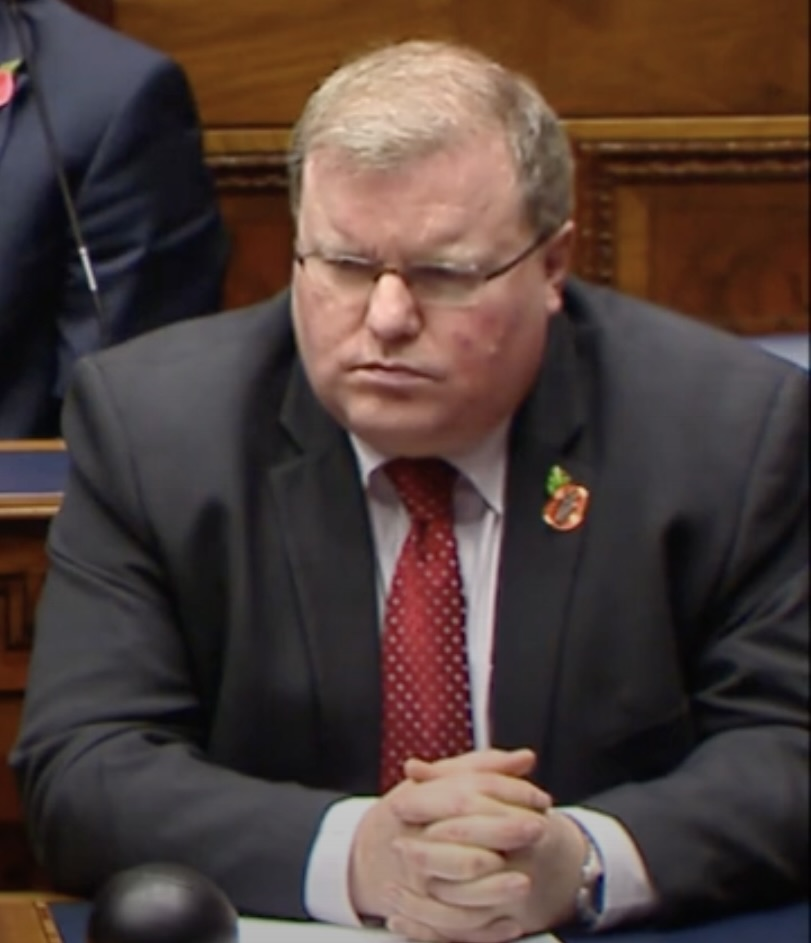
- Craig in 2015

Member of Lisburn City and Castlereagh District Council
- Incumbent
- Assumed office 2 June 2016
- Preceded by: Jennifer Palmer
- Constituency: Lisburn North

Member of the Northern Ireland Assembly for Lagan Valley
- In office 7 March 2007 – 6 May 2016
- Preceded by: Norah Beare
- Succeeded by: Jennifer Palmer

Member of Lisburn City Council
- In office 7 June 2001 – 22 May 2014
- Preceded by: William Beattie
- Succeeded by: Council abolished
- Constituency: Lisburn Town North

Personal details
- Born: 2 February 1965 (age 61) Lisburn, Northern Ireland
- Party: Democratic Unionist Party
- Spouse: Yvonne Strong
- Children: 2
- Education: University of Ulster
- Profession: Engineer

Jonathan Craig is a Democratic Unionist Party (DUP) politician, serving as a Lisburn and Castlereagh Councillor for the Lisburn North DEA since 2016. Craig was a Member of the Legislative Assembly (MLA) for Lagan Valley from 2007 to 2016.

== Biography ==
Craig was educated at Dromore High School, Friends School and is a graduate of the University of Ulster. He was first elected to Lisburn City Council in 2001, representing the Lisburn Town North District, and served as Mayor of Lisburn from 2005 to 2006.

He was elected to the Northern Ireland Assembly at the 2007 Assembly election for Lagan Valley.

Craig was later re-elected to the Assembly in 2011, and Lisburn City Council in the local elections held the same day.

As an MLA, Craig was a Political Member of the Northern Ireland Policing Board.

At the 2016 Assembly election, he lost his seat to his running mate, Brenda Hale.

Following his defeat at the Assembly election, Craig was co-opted onto Lisburn and Castlereagh City Council for the Lisburn North District; he was re-elected in 2019 and 2023.

Civic offices
Preceded by Cecil Calvert	Mayor of Lisburn; 2005–2006	Succeeded by Trevor Lunn
Northern Ireland Assembly
Preceded by Norah Beare	MLA for Lagan Valley; 2007–2016	Succeeded by Jenny Palmer
