= Trevor Lunn =

Northern Ireland politician (born 1946)

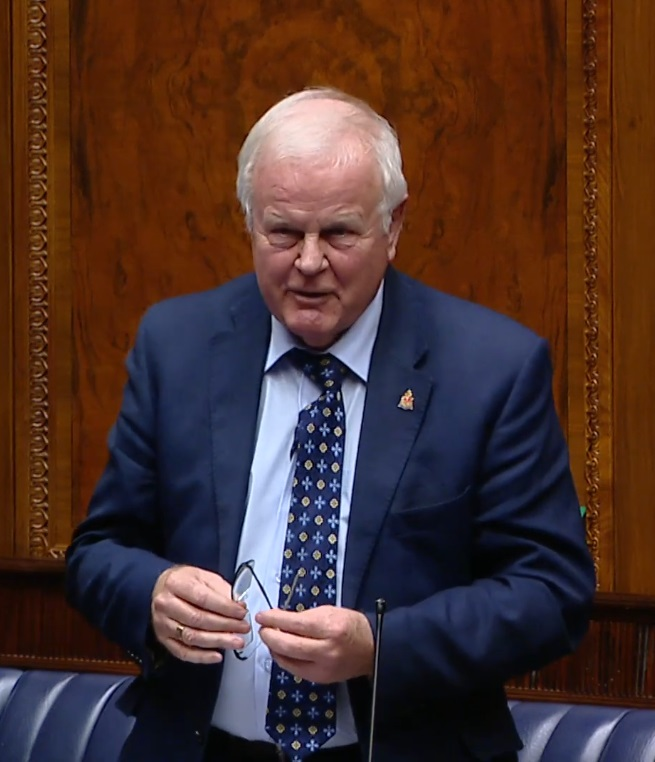
- Lunn in 2021

Member of the Northern Ireland Assembly for Lagan Valley
- In office 7 March 2007 – 28 March 2022
- Preceded by: Seamus Close
- Succeeded by: Sorcha Eastwood

Member of Lisburn City Council
- In office 7 June 2001 – 5 May 2011
- Preceded by: Frazer McCammond
- Succeeded by: Brian Doran
- Constituency: Lisburn Town North

Personal details
- Born: 29 June 1946 (age 80) England
- Party: Independent (since 2020)
- Other political affiliations: Alliance (until 2020)

Trevor Lunn (born 29 June 1946) is a former Northern Irish politician who served as a Member of the Legislative Assembly (MLA) for Lagan Valley from 2007 to 2022. Formerly a member of the Alliance Party, Lunn resigned from the party in 2020, sitting as an independent for the remainder of his term.

== Career ==
Lunn was first elected to Lisburn City Council in 2001, representing the Lisburn Town North DEA, and was re-elected in 2005.

As a councillor, Lunn served as Mayor of Lisburn between 2006 and 2007.

He was elected to the Northern Ireland Assembly for Lagan Valley in the 2007 assembly election. Lunn took over the Alliance candidacy for Lagan Valley from Seamus Close, the longtime representative for the area. While many pundits predicted that Alliance would struggle to hold on to the seat, Lunn's performance saw the new candidate elected fourth out of the six seats available. He retained the seat at the 2011 Assembly election. He is a former chairman of the Alliance Party.

As an MLA, Lunn was a Political Member of the Northern Ireland Policing Board.

Regarding accusations in 2012 of Sinn Féin infiltrating primary schools, Lunn said, "In the context of Lumen Christi as a highly successful grammar school which has taken a public stance on the question of academic selection, in defiance of the minister's instruction and indeed the view of the Catholic Church, it is hard to see these appointments as anything other than a means of infiltration of the school's board of governors, with the aim of influencing the stance taken by the present board."

On 2 March 2020, Lunn announced that he was leaving the Alliance Party due to "internal difficulties"; he continued to sit as an independent MLA. He later announced that he would not be contesting the 2022 Northern Ireland Assembly election.

Civic offices
Preceded by Jonathan Craig	Mayor of Lisburn; 2006–2007	Succeeded by James Tinsley
Northern Ireland Assembly
Preceded by Seamus Close	MLA for Lagan Valley; 2007 – 2022	Succeeded by Sorcha Eastwood
