= Ulster Democratic Party =

Political party in Northern Ireland

- Founded: June 1981
- Dissolved: November 2001
- Preceded by: New Ulster Political Research Group
- Succeeded by: Ulster Political Research Group
- Paramilitary wing: Ulster Defence Association
- Ideology: Ulster loyalism Ulster nationalism Devolution
- Political position: Right-wing

The Ulster Democratic Party (UDP) was a small loyalist political party in Northern Ireland. It was established in June 1981 as the Ulster Loyalist Democratic Party by the Ulster Defence Association (UDA), to replace the New Ulster Political Research Group. The UDP name had previously been used in the 1930s by an unrelated party, which on one occasion contested Belfast Central.

== History ==
The party's roots were firmly in the Protestant community of Northern Ireland, but its initial political stance was not the traditional unionist one favoured by that section of society. Instead, it supported independence for Northern Ireland within the European Economic Community and the Commonwealth. These policies had been set out by its predecessors in the New Ulster Political Research Group, in their Beyond the Religious Divide policy document. However, this position did not capture the electorate's imagination, and the UDP switched to supporting the UDA's Common Sense position, which suggested an assembly and executive for the region, elected by proportional representation. It also supported a written Bill of Rights and Constitution.

In the early years the party's electoral support was limited. Its first foray into electoral politics was deeply disappointing, with the party leader John McMichael polling only 576 votes (1.3%) in the 1982 Belfast South by-election. The party's two candidates in the 1982 Assembly election in Belfast North similarly failed to make an impact. It was not until the 1989 local elections that the party made its electoral breakthrough, when Ken Kerr won a seat on Derry City Council, in the Waterside area. Around that time, the UDP dropped the "Loyalist" part of its name. Although Kerr lost his council seat in 1993, Gary McMichael—son of the late John McMichael, who had been assassinated in 1987—won a seat on Lisburn City Council for the party. It increased its number of council seats to four in 1997.

This was due in part to the UDP's increased public profile, after it played a role in the loyalist ceasefire of 1994 and contested the 1996 election to the Northern Ireland Forum. Although it failed to win any constituency seats, as one of the ten most successful parties it was awarded two "top-up" seats; these were taken by Gary McMichael and John White. This entitled the party to a place in the all-party talks that led to the 1998 Belfast Agreement. In January 1998 the UDP voluntarily withdrew from the peace talks, before it could be expelled in response to a number of murders committed by the Ulster Freedom Fighters, a cover name for the UDA. It rejoined the talks in February 1998.

The party officially supported devolution for Northern Ireland and the creation of an assembly, but in this it was at odds with the UDA and much of the party's membership; this led to a split in the party. The UDP failed to win any seats at the 1998 Assembly election. It lost a council seat in the 2001 local elections and saw its support reduce. (The party's candidates had been forced to run as independents, after the party forgot to register its name with the Electoral Commission.)

Disagreement over the Belfast Agreement continued between the UDP leadership and the UDA, and within the UDP itself. Gary McMichael declared in July 2001, after the paramilitary group declared itself anti-Agreement, that the UDP could no longer speak for the UDA. As a result of these tensions, the party dissolved in November 2001. Its role has largely been taken over by the Ulster Political Research Group.

== Electoral performance ==
=== UK parliament by-elections ===
Date of election	Constituency	Candidate	Votes	%	Position
4 March 1982	Belfast South	John McMichael	576	1.3	5th
2 February 1990	Upper Bann	Gary McMichael	600	1.7	8th

=== Northern Ireland Assembly elections ===
Election	Candidates	Seats won	±	First pref. votes	%	±
1982	2	0 / 78	Steady	1,086	0.17	Steady
1996	52 (Note: 42 constituency, 10 list)	2 / 78	▲2	16,715	2.24	▲2.07
1998	9	0 / 78	▼2	8,651	1.07	▼1.17

=== Local elections ===
Election	Seats won	±	First pref. votes	%	±
1985	0 / 565	Steady	782	0.1	Steady
1989	1 / 565	▲1	2,413	0.4	▲0.3
1993	1 / 582	Steady	2,181	0.4	Steady
1997	4 / 582	▲3	6,244	1.0	▲0.6
