= 2019 Northern Ireland local elections =

- 2 May 2019

All 11 districts, 462 council seats
- Turnout: 52.7% (▲1.4%)
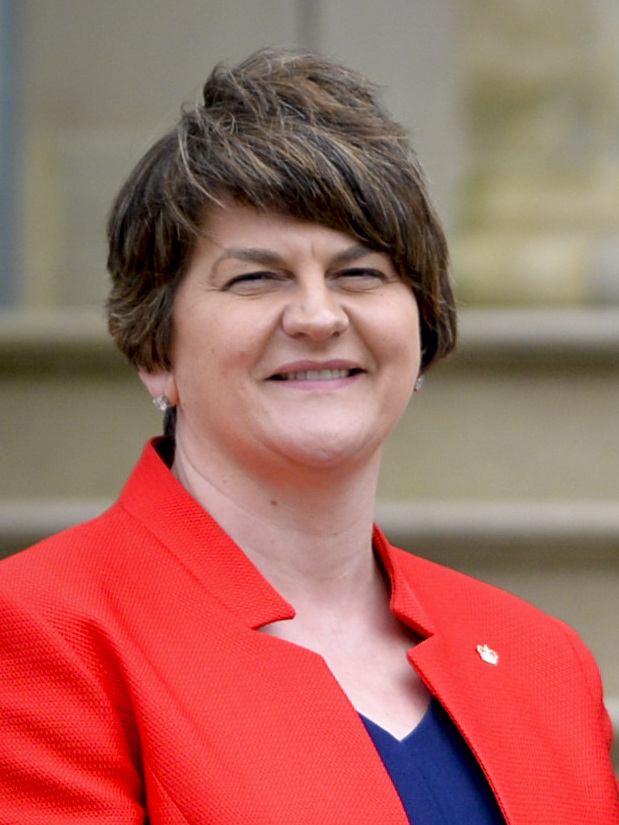

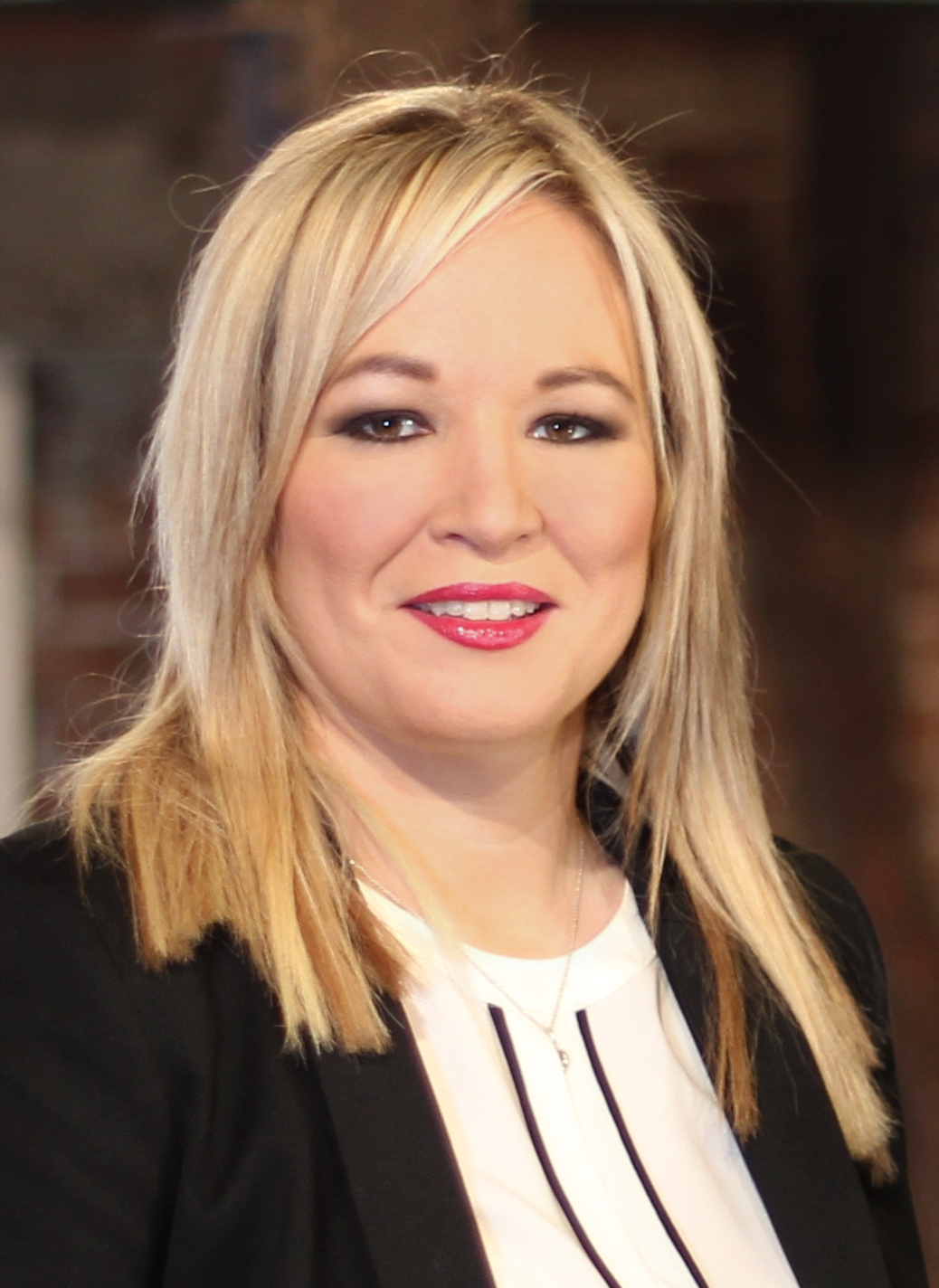

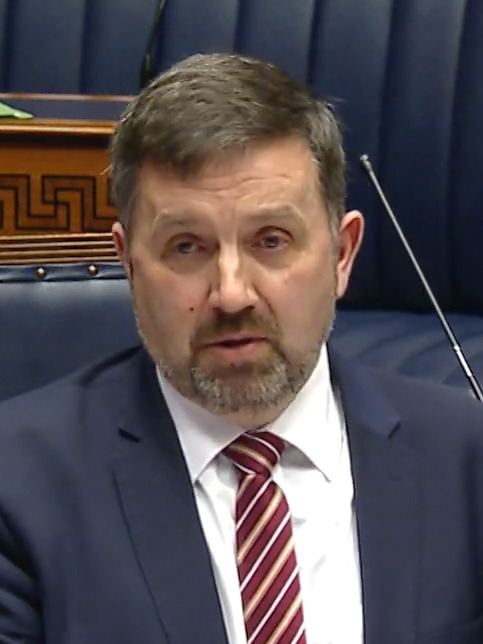

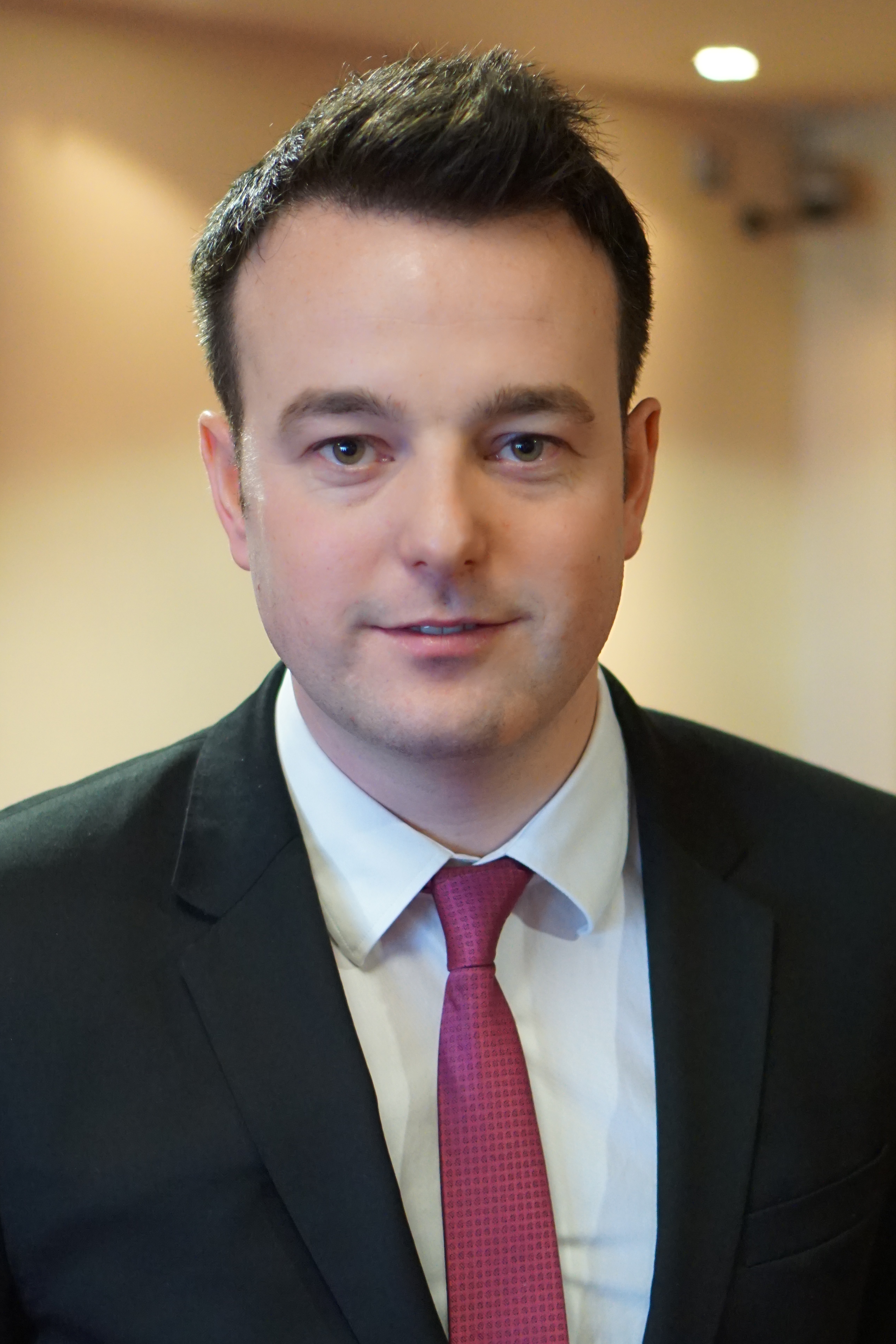

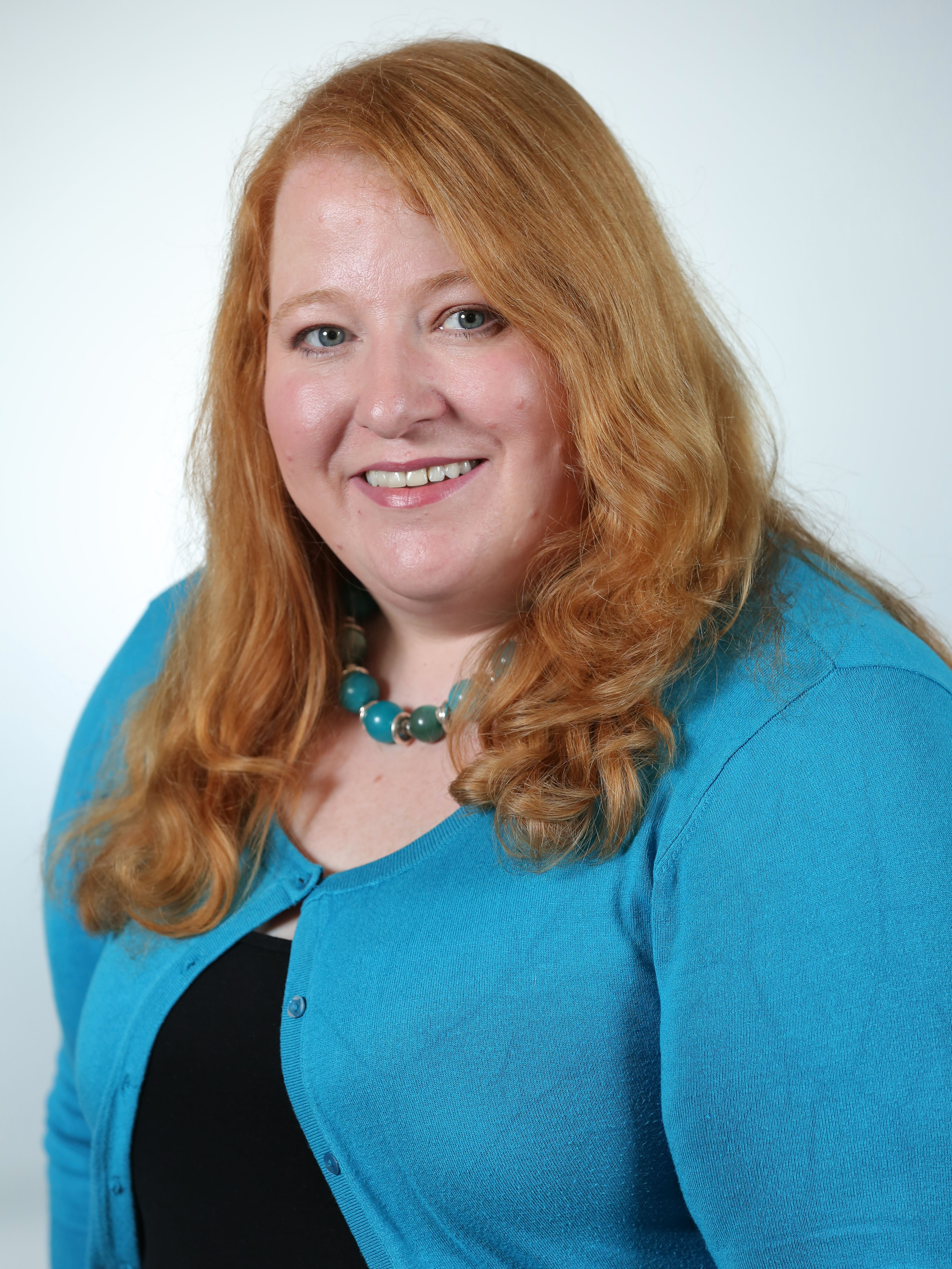

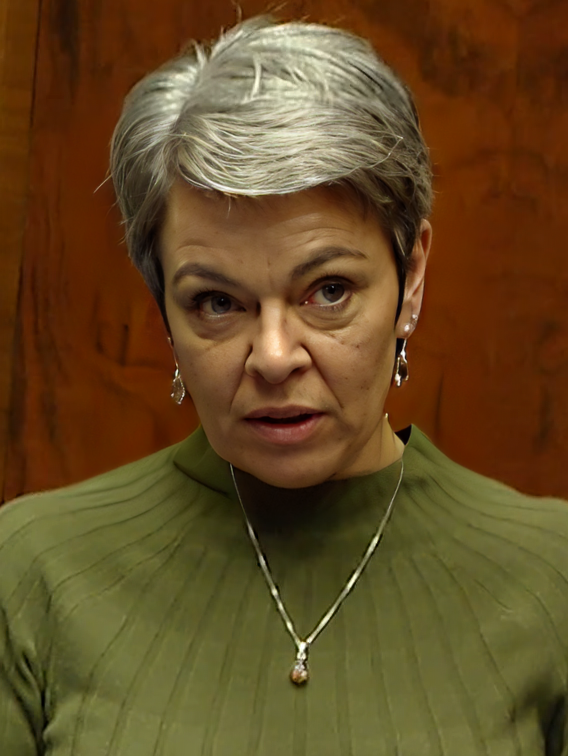

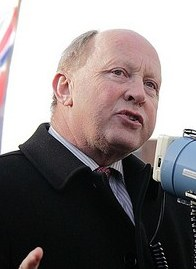

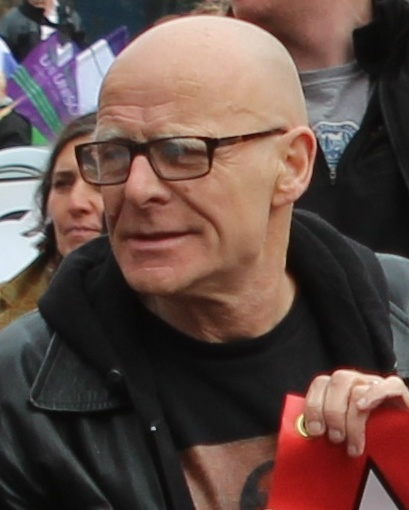
	First party	Second party	Third party
Leader	Arlene Foster	Michelle O'Neill (Note: The leader of Sinn Féin is Mary Lou McDonald, who sits as a TD in the Irish Dáil Éireann for Dublin Central. O'Neill is the leader of the party in Northern Ireland.)	Robin Swann
Party	DUP	Sinn Féin	UUP
Last election	130	105	88
Seats won	122	105	75
Seat change	▼8	Steady	▼13
Popular vote	163,615	157,448	95,320
Percentage	24.1%	23.2%	14.0%
Swing	▲1.0%	▼0.8%	▼2.1%
	Fourth party	Fifth party	Sixth party
Leader	Colum Eastwood	Naomi Long	Clare Bailey
Party	SDLP	Alliance	Green (NI)
Last election	66	32	4
Seats won	59	53	8
Seat change	▼7	▲21	▲4
Popular vote	81,419	78,052	14,284
Percentage	12.0%	11.5%	2.1%
Swing	▼1.6%	▲4.8%	▲1.3%
	Seventh party	Eighth party	Ninth party
			PUP
Leader	Jim Allister	Eamonn McCann (Note: People Before Profit has a collective leadership but for the purposes of registration to the UK Electoral Commission Eamonn McCann is registered as the party's leader in Northern Ireland.)	Billy Hutchinson
Party	TUV	People Before Profit	PUP
Last election	13	1	4
Seats won	6	5	3
Seat change	▼7	▲4	▼1
Popular vote	15,165	9,478	5,338
Percentage	2.2%	1.4%	0.7%
Swing	▼2.3%	▲1.1%	▼1.2%

Local elections were held in Northern Ireland on Thursday 2 May 2019. The last elections were held in 2014. 819 candidates contested 462 seats across Northern Ireland's 11 local government districts. 1,305,384 people aged 18 and over were eligible to vote, and 52.7% of the electorate turned out.

== Electoral system ==
Northern Ireland uses the Single Transferable Vote (STV) system to elect members of local councils and members of the Northern Ireland Assembly. Voters rank candidates in order of preference by marking 1, 2, 3, etc. to the names of candidates on a ballot paper and can rank as many or as few candidates as they like or just vote for one candidate. These were the second elections held on new boundaries, introduced in 2014.

These were the first Northern Ireland elections at which people have been able to register to vote online.

== Background ==
The Northern Ireland Assembly had been suspended since 2017 with the failure of powersharing between the DUP and Sinn Féin. However, in March 2019, the Secretary of State for Northern Ireland Karen Bradley stated that, after the local elections, the government wished to revive Assembly talks. At the 2017 United Kingdom general election, no party won an overall majority in the UK Parliament, so the DUP agreed a deal to support a minority Conservative government. UK politics was dominated by Brexit, which was due to take place before the local elections, however it was delayed until 31 January 2020.

All the parties with elected councillors from the last elections were running again, including the major parties of the Democratic Unionist Party (DUP), Sinn Féin, Ulster Unionist Party (UUP), Social Democratic and Labour Party (SDLP) and Alliance Party of Northern Ireland. The SDLP and Fianna Fáil held talks about running a joint campaign for the May 2019 local elections, with the possibility of the SDLP merging into Fianna Fáil. There was division within the membership of the SDLP as to what form of relationship to have between the two parties. The two parties announced a partnership agreement in January 2019 rather than a full merger. In February 2019, both party leaders criticised the DUP and Sinn Féin over the continuing deadlock over power sharing in the Assembly.

Aontú is a new party, an anti-abortion splinter from Sinn Féin, launched in January 2019. By February 2019, it had two councillors in Northern Ireland, one defecting from the SDLP and a second from Sinn Féin. The party nominated 16 candidates across 7 of the 11 local councils.

== Candidates ==
819 candidates stood, compared to 905 at the previous elections. The DUP fielded 172, Sinn Féin 155, the UUP 117, the SDLP 85 and Alliance 84. Others standing include the Green Party Northern Ireland, TUV, People Before Profit Alliance, The Workers Party, Progressive Unionist Party, Cross-Community Labour Alternative, Aontú, NI Conservatives, UKIP and several independents.

== Results ==
Paralleling results in England, Alliance, some smaller parties and independents made significant gains. The largest nationalist party, Sinn Féin, returned the same number of councillors as in 2014. The DUP, UUP and SDLP all saw losses. The TUV saw significant losses and UKIP and NI21 lost all of their seats in the region, while Aontú and Cross-Community Labour Alternative won their first seats and there were gains by People Before Profit and the Greens.

=== Largest Party by Council ===
Council	Seats	Turnout	Largest party prior to election	Largest party post election
Belfast	60	51.0	Sinn Féin (19)	Sinn Féin (18)
Ards & North Down	40	43.6	DUP (17)	DUP (14)
Antrim & Newtownabbey	40	49.1	DUP (15)	DUP (14)
Lisburn & Castlereagh	40	49.7	DUP (20)	DUP (15)
Newry, Mourne & Down	41	56.1	Sinn Féin (14)	Sinn Féin (16)
Newry, Mourne & Down	41	56.1	SDLP (14)	
Armagh, Banbridge & Craigavon	41	53.6	DUP (13)	DUP (11)
Mid & East Antrim	40	48.1	DUP (16)	DUP (15)
Causeway Coast & Glens	40	51.8	DUP (11)	DUP (14)
Mid Ulster	40	60.1	Sinn Féin (18)	Sinn Féin (17)
Derry & Strabane	40	57.2	Sinn Féin (16)	Sinn Féin (11)
Derry & Strabane	40	57.2		SDLP (11)
Fermanagh & Omagh	40	62.4	Sinn Féin (17)	Sinn Féin (15)
Total	462	52.7	DUP (130)	DUP (122)

=== Results by Council ===
Name	Northern Ireland Council Seats												
Name													Total
Name	DUP	SF	UUP	SDLP	APNI	Green	TUV	PBP	PUP	Aontú	CCLA	Ind.	Total
Antrim & Newtownabbey	14	5	9	4	7	–	–	–	–	–	–	1	40
Ards & North Down	14	–	8	1	10	3	1	–	–	–	–	3	40
Armagh, Banbridge & Craigavon	11	10	10	6	3	–	–	–	–	–	–	1	41
Belfast City	15	18	2	6	10	4	–	3	2	–	–	–	60
Causeway Coast & Glens	14	9	7	6	2	–	–	–	1	–	–	1	40
Derry & Strabane	7	11	2	11	2	–	–	2	–	1	–	4	40
Fermanagh & Omagh	5	15	9	5	1	–	–	–	–	–	1	4	40
Lisburn & Castlereagh	15	2	11	2	9	1	–	–	–	–	–	0	40
Mid & East Antrim	15	2	7	1	7	–	5	–	–	–	–	3	40
Mid-Ulster	9	17	6	6	–	–	–	–	–	–	–	2	40
Newry, Mourne & Down	3	16	4	11	2	–	–	–	–	–	–	5	41
Total	122	105	75	59	53	8	6	5	3	1	1	24	462

=== Results by party ===
Party	Councillors			% of councillors			First preference votes			% of FP votes		
Party	2014	2019	+/-	2014	2019	+/-	2014	2019	+/-	2014	2019	+/-
DUP	130	122	▼8	28.1%	26.4%	▼1.7%	144,928	163,615	▲18,687	23.1%	24.13%	▲1.0%
Sinn Féin	105	105	Steady	22.7%	22.7%	Steady	151,137	157,448	▲6,311	24.1%	23.22%	▼0.8%
UUP	88	75	▼13	19.0%	16.2%	▼2.8%	101,385	95,320	▼6,065	16.1%	14.06%	▼2.1%
SDLP	66	59	▼7	14.2%	12.8%	▼1.4%	85,237	81,419	▼3,818	13.6%	12.01%	▼1.6%
Alliance	32	53	▲21	6.9%	11.5%	▲4.6%	41,769	78,052	▲36,283	6.7%	11.51%	▲4.8%
Independent	15	24	▲9	3.2%	5.2%	▲2.0%	26,682	29,339	▲2,657	4.2%	4.33%	▲0.1%
Green (NI)	4	8	▲4	0.8%	1.7%	▲0.9%	5,515	14,284	▲8,769	0.8%	2.11%	▲1.3%
TUV	13	6	▼7	2.8%	1.3%	▼1.5%	28,310	15,165	▼13,145	4.5%	2.24%	▼2.3%
People Before Profit	1	5	▲4	0.2%	1.2%	▲1.0%	1,923	9,478	▲7,555	0.3%	1.40%	▲1.1%
PUP	4	3	▼1	0.8%	0.6%	▼0.2%	12,753	5,338	▼7,415	2.0%	0.79%	▼1.2%
Aontú	n/a	1	▲1	n/a	0.2%	▲0.2%	n/a	7,459	▲7,459	n/a	1.10%	▲1.1%
Labour Alternative	n/a	1	▲1	n/a	0.2%	▲0.2%	n/a	880	▲880	n/a	0.13%	▲
UKIP	3	0	▼3	1.2%	0.0%	▼1.2%	9,311	3,026	▼6,285	1.4%	0.45%	▼1.0%
NI Conservatives	1	0	▼1	0.0%	0.0%	▼1.6%	2,527	1,364	▼1,163	0.4%	0.20%	▼0.2%
Workers' Party	0	0	Steady	0.0%	0.0%	Steady	985	868	▼117	0.2%		▼
Democrats and Veterans	n/a	0	Steady	n/a	0.0%	Steady	n/a	527	▲527	n/a		▲
South Belfast Unionists	n/a	0	Steady	n/a	0.0%	Steady	n/a	233	▲233	n/a		▲
CISTA	n/a	0	Steady	n/a	0.0%	Steady	n/a	101	▲101	n/a		▲
NI21	1	n/a	▼1	0.2%	n/a	▼0.2%	11,495	n/a	▼11,495	1.8%	n/a	▼1.8%
Total	462	462	Steady	100%	100%	Steady	628,078	663,916	▲	100%	100%	Steady

== Councils ==
=== Antrim and Newtownabbey ===
Airport
Party	Candidate	1st pref.
Alliance	Vikki McAuley	1,221
DUP	Matthew Magill	1,164
SDLP	Thomas Burns	1,125
Sinn Féin	Anne-Marie Logue	1,095
UUP	Paul Michael	893
UUP	Mervyn Rea	568
Sinn Féin	Cathy Rooney	505
DUP	Ben Mallon	481
Turnout		7,052
Alliance gain from UUP		

Antrim
Party	Candidate	1st pref.
Alliance	Neil Kelly	1,689
DUP	John Smyth	734
SDLP	Roisin Lynch	723
UUP	Leah Smyth	615
DUP	Paul Dunlop	603
Sinn Féin	Gerard Magee	583
UUP	Jim Montgomery	416
DUP	Karl McMeekin	363
Independent	Adrian Cochrane-Watson	359
TUV	Richard Cairns	347
Turnout		6,432
No change

Ballyclare
Party	Candidate	1st pref.
UUP	Danny Kinahan	1,253
Independent	Michael Stewart	1,182
DUP	Mandy Girvan	861
Alliance	Gary English	775
DUP	Jeannie Archibald	739
UUP	Vera McWilliam	707
Independent	David Arthurs	457
DUP	Austin Orr	443
UUP	Norrie Ramsey	341
Turnout		6,758
Independent gain from TUV		

Dunsilly
Party	Candidate	1st pref.
Sinn Féin	Henry Cushinan	1,064
Alliance	Glenn Finlay	989
DUP	Linda Clarke	965
DUP	Jordan Greer	907
SDLP	Ryan Wilson	902
UUP	Roderick Swann	711
Sinn Féin	Andrew Maguire	552
UUP	Gareth Thomas	424
Turnout		6,514
Alliance gain from DUP		

Glengormley Urban
Party	Candidate	1st pref.
Alliance	Julian McGrath	1,345
DUP	Phillip Brett	1,099
SDLP	Noreen McClelland	992
Sinn Féin	Michael Goodman	904
UUP	Mark Cosgrove	891
DUP	Alison Bennington	856
Sinn Féin	Rosie Kinnear	801
DUP	Samantha Burns	373
Green (NI)	Paul Veronica	341
UUP	Michael Maguire	337
Turnout		7,939
Sinn Féin gain from UUP		

Macedon
Party	Candidate	1st pref.
Alliance	Billy Webb	1,127
DUP	Paul Hamill	1,043
DUP	Thomas Hogg	999
UUP	Robert Foster	956
Sinn Féin	Taylor McGrann	765
Independent	Stafford Ward	343
DUP	Victor Robinson	327
DUP	Dean McCullough	321
TUV	David Hollis	223
UKIP	Robert Hill	154
Turnout		6,258
Sinn Féin gain from TUV		

Three Mile Water
Party	Candidate	1st pref.
DUP	Mark Cooper	1,230
DUP	Stephen Ross	1,103
UUP	Fraser Agnew	1,100
Alliance	Tom Campbell	1,075
Alliance	Julie Gilmour	749
UUP	Stephen McCarthy	514
DUP	Sam Flanagan	489
UKIP	Raymond Stewart	319
TUV	Norman Boyd	234
Independent	Gary Grattan	223
Turnout		7,036
Alliance gain from UUP		

=== Ards and North Down ===
Ards Peninsula
Party	Candidate	1st pref.
DUP	Robert Adair	2,189
SDLP	Joe Boyle	1,621
UUP	Angus Carson	832
Alliance	Lorna McAlpine	832
DUP	Eddie Thompson	821
DUP	Nigel Edmund	735
Green (NI)	Michele Strong	319
UKIP	Matt Davey	234
Sinn Féin	Murdock McKibbin	196
NI Conservatives	Tim Mullen	58
Turnout		7,837
No change

Bangor Central
Party	Candidate	1st pref.
Alliance	Karen Douglas	1,346
Green (NI)	Stephen Dunlop	1,046
DUP	Wesley Irvine	878
DUP	Alistair Cathcart	787
UUP	Craig Blaney	757
UUP	Ian Henry	542
Independent	Ray McKimm	503
Independent	Noelle Robinson	423
Independent	Maria Lourenço	362
DUP	James Cochrane	255
UKIP	John Montgomery	215
NI Conservatives	Frank Shivers	210
Independent	Gavan Reynolds	33
Turnout		7,357
Independent gain from UUP		

Bangor East and Donaghadee
Party	Candidate	1st pref.
UUP	Mark Brooks	1,327
Alliance	Gavin Walker	1,303
UUP	David Chambers	963
DUP	Peter Martin	902
Independent	Tom Smith	764
DUP	Bill Keery	764
Green (NI)	Hannah McNamara	735
DUP	Janice MacArthur	702
NI Conservatives	Paul Leeman	137
Turnout		7,598
Tom Smith leaves DUP		

Bangor West
Party	Candidate	1st pref.
Alliance	Connie Egan	1,151
DUP	Jennifer Gilmour	990
UUP	Marion Smith	982
Green (NI)	Barry McKee	949
DUP	Alan Graham	749
Alliance	Scott Wilson	703
NI Conservatives	Ben English	114
Sinn Féin	Kieran Maxwell	71
Turnout		5,709
Alliance gain from DUP		

Comber
Party	Candidate	1st pref.
Alliance	Deborah Girvan	1,516
UUP	Philip Smith	1,082
DUP	Robert Gibson	985
DUP	Trevor Cummings	843
TUV	Stephen Cooper	695
DUP	John Montgomery	643
Green (NI)	Ricky Bamford	372
UUP	Michael Palmer	318
Independent	John Sloan	73
Turnout		6,527
No change

Holywood and Clandeboye
Party	Candidate	1st pref.
Alliance	Andrew Muir	1,397
Green (NI)	Rachel Woods	1,311
Alliance	Gillian Greer	1,249
DUP	Stephen Dunne	1,139
DUP	Roberta Dunlop	677
UUP	Carl McClean	507
UUP	Tim Lemon	416
NI Conservatives	Andrew Turner	141
Turnout		6,837
Alliance gain from DUP		

Newtownards
Party	Candidate	1st pref.
Independent	Jimmy Menagh	2,138
DUP	Naomi Armstrong	1,232
Alliance	Nick Mathison	1,091
DUP	Stephen McIlveen	898
UUP	Richard Smart	736
Alliance	Alan McDowell	574
DUP	Colin Kennedy	570
UUP	Ian Dickson	481
Green (NI)	Maurice Macartney	374
UKIP	Paul Corry	223
Independent	Ben King	24
Turnout		8,341
Alliance gain from UUP		

=== Armagh, Banbridge and Craigavon ===
Armagh
Party	Candidate	1st pref.
Sinn Féin	Garath Keating	2,037
UUP	Sam Nicholson	1,697
Sinn Féin	Jackie Donnelly	1,677
DUP	Freda Donnelly	1,638
SDLP	Thomas O'Hanlon	1,491
Sinn Féin	Darren McNally	1,413
SDLP	Mealla Campbell	1,246
Aontú	Martin Kelly	822
Alliance	Jackie Coade	674
Independent	Pol Oh-Again	28
Turnout		12,723
Sinn Féin gain from DUP		

Banbridge
Party	Candidate	1st pref.
UUP	Glenn Barr	1,764
DUP	Paul Greenfield	1,563
Alliance	Brian Pope	1,425
UUP	Jill Macauley	1,350
SDLP	Seamus Doyle	1,309
UUP	Ian Burns	1,273
DUP	Junior McCrum	1,232
Sinn Féin	Kevin Savage	1,038
Sinn Féin	Vincent McAleenan	676
TUV	William Martin	508
Turnout		12,138
Alliance gain from SDLP		

Craigavon
Party	Candidate	1st pref.
DUP	Margaret Tinsley	1,416
Sinn Féin	Catherine Nelson	1,332
SDLP	Thomas Larkham	1,244
DUP	Robert Smith	1,105
UUP	Kenneth Twyble	1,037
SDLP	Declan McAlinden	1,014
UUP	Kate Evans	871
Sinn Féin	Michael Tallon	727
Alliance	Sean Hagan	699
Aontú	Fergal Lennon	230
Turnout		9,675
SDLP gain from DUP		

Cusher
Party	Candidate	1st pref.
DUP	Gareth Wilson	2,248
Independent	Paul Berry	2,009
UUP	Jim Speers	1,633
Sinn Féin	Brona Haughey	1,519
UUP	Gordon Kennedy	1,229
DUP	Quincey Dougan	1,215
SDLP	Seamus Livingstone	901
Alliance	Gareth Hay	462
Independent	Paul Bowbanks	241
Turnout		11,457
Sinn Féin gain from SDLP		

Lagan River
Party	Candidate	1st pref.
DUP	Mark Baxter	1,876
UUP	Kyle Savage	1,614
DUP	Paul Rankin	1,444
Alliance	Eóin Tennyson	960
UUP	Olive Mercer	871
DUP	Tim McClelland	678
TUV	Samuel Morrison	499
SDLP	John O'Hare	369
Sinn Féin	Tony Gorrell	227
Independent	Sammy Ogle	217
UKIP	Jordan Stewart	129
Turnout		8,884
Alliance gain from UUP		

Lurgan
Party	Candidate	1st pref.
Sinn Féin	Keith Haughian	1,974
UUP	Louise McKinstry	1,524
DUP	Stephen Moutray	1,504
Alliance	Peter Lavery	1,321
DUP	Terry McWilliams	1,282
Sinn Féin	Liam Mackle	1,190
SDLP	Joe Nelson	1,046
SDLP	Ciaran Toman	926
Sinn Féin	Sorcha McGeown	823
Sinn Féin	Noel McGeown	454
Turnout		12,044
Alliance gain from DUP		

Portadown
Party	Candidate	1st pref.
DUP	Darren Causby	2,077
DUP	Sydney Anderson	1,696
Sinn Féin	Paul Duffy	1,675
UUP	Julie Flaherty	1,512
SDLP	Eamonn McNeill	967
DUP	Lavelle McIlwrath	866
Alliance	Emma Hutchinson	570
TUV	Darrin Foster	547
UUP	Arnold Hatch	506
Sinn Féin	Callum O'Dufaigh	392
Independent	David Jones	266
UKIP	David Jameson	149
Turnout		11,223
DUP gain from UUP		
SDLP gain from UKIP		

=== Belfast ===
Balmoral
Party	Candidate	1st pref.
Alliance	Kate Nicholl	1,842
DUP	David Graham	1,442
SDLP	Dónal Lyons	1,306
Sinn Féin	Geraldine McAteer	1,283
DUP	Sarah Bunting	1,025
SDLP	Michael Mulhern	813
UUP	Jeffrey Dudgeon	660
Green (NI)	Caoimhe O'Connell	504
People Before Profit	Pádraigín Mervyn	202
UKIP	William Traynor	133
Turnout		9,210
DUP gain from UUP		

Black Mountain
Party	Candidate	1st pref.
People Before Profit	Matt Collins	2,268
Sinn Féin	Ciaran Beattie	1,893
Sinn Féin	Steven Corr	1,864
Sinn Féin	Arder Carson	1,634
Sinn Féin	Micheal Donnelly	1,535
Sinn Féin	Emma Groves	1,431
Sinn Féin	Ronan McLaughlin	1,316
SDLP	Paul Doherty	783
Aontú	Eoin Geraghty	750
Alliance	Liam Norris	213
Green (NI)	Stevie Maginn	206
Workers' Party	Conor Campbell	162
Turnout		14,053
Sinn Féin gain from SDLP		

Botanic
Party	Candidate	1st pref.
Green (NI)	Áine Groogan	1,401
DUP	Tracy Kelly	1,365
Sinn Féin	Deirdre Hargey	1,325
Alliance	Emmet McDonough-Brown	1,143
SDLP	Gary McKeown	1,009
Alliance	Micky Murray	754
DUP	Graham Craig	615
Independent	Declan Boyle	609
People Before Profit	Paul Loughran	383
UUP	Richard Kennedy	333
South Belfast Unionists	Billy Dickson	233
Sinn Féin	Caitríona Mullaghan	229
PUP	Ian Shanks	170
Workers' Party	Paddy Lynn	87
TUV	John Hiddleston	82
Turnout		9,758
Green gain from UUP		

Castle
Party	Candidate	1st pref.
Alliance	Nuala McAllister	1,787
Sinn Féin	John Finucane	1,650
DUP	Fred Cobain	1,439
DUP	Guy Spence	1,407
Sinn Féin	Mary Ellen Campbell	1,103
UUP	David Browne	1,014
Green (NI)	Mal O'Hara	882
SDLP	Carl Whyte	651
SDLP	Heather Wilson	551
Independent	Patrick Convery	377
People Before Profit	Riley Johnson	204
Workers' Party	Gemma Weir	159
Independent	Cathal Mullaghan	76
Turnout		11,300
Green gain from UUP		

Collin
Party	Candidate	1st pref.
Sinn Féin	Danny Baker	2,196
Sinn Féin	Stephen Magennis	1,616
People Before Profit	Michael Collins	1,565
Sinn Féin	Seanna Walsh	1,402
Sinn Féin	Matt Garrett	1,264
Sinn Féin	Charlene O'Hara	1,187
SDLP	Brian Heading	970
Aontú	Nichola McClean	670
Alliance	Donnamarie Higgins	443
DUP	David McKee	309
Green (NI)	Ellen Murray	241
UUP	Fred Rodgers	130
Workers' Party	Paddy Crossan	109
Turnout		12,102
People Before Profit gain from Sinn Féin		

Court
Party	Candidate	1st pref.
DUP	Frank McCoubrey	2,227
DUP	Brian Kingston	1,648
Sinn Féin	Claire Canavan	1,447
Sinn Féin	Tina Black	1,396
DUP	Nicola Verner	1,119
PUP	Billy Hutchinson	929
People Before Profit	Cailín McCaffrey	686
UUP	Dave Anderson	385
Independent	Jolene Bunting	351
SDLP	Tiernan Fitzlarkin	298
TUV	Eric Smyth	258
Alliance	Ciara Campbell	253
Workers' Party	Joanne Lowry	166
Green (NI)	Sinéad Magner	147
Turnout		11,310
DUP gain from TUV		

Lisnasharragh
Party	Candidate	1st pref.
Alliance	Michael Long	1,755
DUP	David Brooks	1,479
Alliance	Eric Hanvey	1,429
Green (NI)	Brian Smyth	1,233
SDLP	Séamas De Faoite	988
DUP	Tommy Sandford	951
DUP	Aileen Graham	660
Sinn Féin	Stevie Jenkins	619
UUP	Chris McGimpsey	508
UUP	Ben Manton	415
PUP	Gwen Ferguson	363
Independent	Kate Mullan	204
UKIP	Catherine McComb	169
Labour Alternative	Amy Ferguson	160
People Before Profit	Ivanka Antova	133
Turnout		11,066
Green gain from UUP		

Oldpark
Party	Candidate	1st pref.
SDLP	Paul McCusker	2,856
DUP	Dale Pankhurst	1,701
Sinn Féin	Ryan Murphy	1,185
Sinn Féin	JJ Magee	1,134
Sinn Féin	Shauneen Baker	1,107
Sinn Féin	Mary Clarke	796
PUP	Julie-Anne Corr-Johnston	575
DUP	Gillian Simpson	573
People Before Profit	Fiona Ferguson	447
Alliance	Jack Armstrong	390
UUP	Jason Docherty	239
Green (NI)	Lesley Veronica	231
Workers' Party	Chris Bailie	93
Turnout		11,327
People Before Profit gain from PUP		

Ormiston
Party	Candidate	1st pref.
Alliance	Ross McMullan	2,622
Alliance	Peter McReynolds	1,764
DUP	Tom Haire	1,462
UUP	Jim Rodgers	1,416
Green (NI)	Anthony Flynn	1,301
DUP	John Hussey	1,269
Alliance	Sian O'Neill	1,165
DUP	Gareth Spratt	857
UUP	Peter Johnston	757
PUP	William Ennis	394
UKIP	Keith Lonsdale	221
Sinn Féin	Laura Misteil	57
Turnout		13,285
Alliance gain from UUP		

Titanic
Party	Candidate	1st pref.
DUP	George Dorrian	1,270
Sinn Féin	Mairead O'Donnell	1,102
Alliance	Michelle Kelly	1,068
Alliance	Carole Howard	1,055
PUP	John Kyle	1,027
DUP	Adam Newton	913
UUP	Sonia Copeland	852
Green (NI)	Ben Smylie	641
DUP	Lee Reynolds	586
Independent	Karl Bennett	448
UUP	Colin Hall-Thompson	278
UKIP	Paul Girvan	228
Turnout		9,468
Alliance gain from Sinn Féin		

=== Causeway Coast and Glens ===
Ballymoney
Party	Candidate	1st pref.
UUP	Darryl Wilson	1,420
DUP	John Finlay	1,322
Sinn Féin	Leanne Peacock	1,153
Sinn Féin	Cathal McLaughlin	906
DUP	Alan McLean	827
DUP	Ivor Wallace	826
Alliance	Peter McCully	734
UUP	Tom McKeown	512
TUV	William Blair	497
Independent	Ian Stevenson	220
TUV	John Wilson	217
UKIP	David Hanna	117
Turnout		8,751
Sinn Féin gain from TUV		

Bann
Party	Candidate	1st pref.
Sinn Féin	Sean Bateson	1,403
DUP	Adrian McQuillan	1,047
UUP	Richard Holmes	964
UUP	William King	799
DUP	Michelle Knight-McQuillan	781
SDLP	Helena Dallat-O'Driscoll	686
DUP	Sam Cole	639
Alliance	Charlie McConaghy	491
PUP	Timmy Reid	251
TUV	Elizabeth Collins	214
Turnout		7,350
Sinn Féin gain from UUP		

Benbradagh
Party	Candidate	1st pref.
Sinn Féin	Sean McGlinchey	1,574
Sinn Féin	Dermot Nicholl	1,002
SDLP	Orla Beattie	922
DUP	Edgar Scott	896
Sinn Féin	Kathleen McGurk	677
Aontú	Prionnsias Brolly	655
TUV	Boyd Douglas	581
UUP	Robert Carmichael	410
Alliance	Christine Turner	332
Turnout		7,049
DUP gain from TUV		

Causeway
Party	Candidate	1st pref.
DUP	Mark Fielding	1,276
Alliance	Chris McCaw	1,212
DUP	Sharon McKillop	1,010
DUP	John McAuley	831
UUP	Sandra Hunter	774
UUP	Norman Hillis	758
Independent	David Alexander	552
SDLP	Angela Mulholland	496
Green (NI)	Mark Coulson	331
TUV	Cyril Quigg	325
Sinn Féin	Emma Thompson	267
TUV	Stewart Moore	167
UKIP	Rebecca Hanna	132
Turnout		8,131
Sharon McKillop leaves TUV		

Coleraine
Party	Candidate	1st pref.
PUP	Russell Watton	1,325
SDLP	Stephanie Quigley	983
DUP	Philip Anderson	901
DUP	George Duddy	866
DUP	Trevor Clarke	769
Alliance	Yvonne Boyle	732
UUP	William McCandless	633
Sinn Féin	Ciarán Archibald	417
UUP	John Wisener	292
NI Conservatives	David Harding	112
UKIP	Amanda Ranaghan	101
Turnout		7,131
Alliance gain from UUP		

Limavady
Party	Candidate	1st pref.
DUP	Alan Robinson	1,498
Sinn Féin	Brenda Chivers	1,034
DUP	James McCorkell	654
Alliance	Kevin Hayward	557
SDLP	Ashleen Schenning	519
UUP	Raymond Kennedy	405
DUP	Aaron Callan	385
Aontú	Francie Brolly	337
TUV	Colin Cartwright	176
Turnout		5,565
Aaron Callan leaves UUP		

The Glens
Party	Candidate	1st pref.
Independent	Ambrose Laverty	1,267
Sinn Féin	Cara McShane	1,102
Sinn Féin	Oliver McMullan	1,097
SDLP	Margaret McKillop	1,080
DUP	Bill Kennedy	843
UUP	Joan Baird	758
Sinn Féin	Kieran Mulholland	589
Turnout		6,736
No change

=== Derry and Strabane ===
Ballyarnett
Party	Candidate	1st pref.
SDLP	Angela Dobbins	1,392
SDLP	Brian Tierney	1,235
SDLP	Rory Farrell	1,170
Aontú	Anne McCloskey	1,032
Sinn Féin	Sandra Duffy	899
Sinn Féin	Aileen Mellon	848
People Before Profit	Nuala Crilly	826
Sinn Féin	Caoimhe McKnight	656
Independent	Warren Robinson	639
Sinn Féin	Neil McLaughlin	538
Alliance	Danny McCloskey	340
Turnout		9,575
SDLP gain from Sinn Féin		
Aontú gain from Independent		

Derg
Party	Candidate	1st pref.
UUP	Derek Hussey	1,267
DUP	Keith Kerrigan	1,090
Sinn Féin	Ruairí McHugh	1,086
Sinn Féin	Kieran McGuire	1,075
SDLP	Cara Hunter	1,032
Sinn Féin	Maoliosa McHugh	798
DUP	Thomas Kerrigan	771
Independent	Andy Patton	735
Alliance	Anne Murray	150
Turnout		8,004
SDLP gain from Sinn Féin		

Faughan
Party	Candidate	1st pref.
DUP	Graham Warke	1,050
DUP	Ryan McCready	940
Sinn Féin	Paul Fleming	854
Alliance	Rachael Ferguson	783
Independent	Paul Hughes	733
UUP	William Jamieson	710
SDLP	Brenda Stevenson	693
SDLP	Jim McKeever	565
SDLP	Gus Hastings	491
Sinn Féin	Conor Heaney	324
Turnout		7,143
Alliance gain from SDLP		

Foyleside
Party	Candidate	1st pref.
SDLP	Mary Durkan	1,231
SDLP	Shauna Cusack	1,129
People Before Profit	Shaun Harkin	977
Sinn Féin	Michael Cooper	888
Independent	Sean Carr	822
SDLP	Lilian Seenoi-Barr	721
Sinn Féin	Eric McGinley	653
Sinn Féin	Hayleigh Fleming	632
Alliance	John Doherty	305
Turnout		7,358
People Before Profit gain from Sinn Féin		

Sperrin
Party	Candidate	1st pref.
DUP	Allan Bresland	1,156
Sinn Féin	Michaela Boyle	1,153
Independent	Paul Gallagher	1,106
Independent	Raymond Barr	920
DUP	Maurice Devenney	899
SDLP	Jason Barr	832
SDLP	Steven Edwards	794
Sinn Féin	Dan Kelly	756
Sinn Féin	Cathal Ó hOisín	740
Sinn Féin	Brian McMahon	731
Independent	Patsy Kelly	595
UUP	Andy McKane	560
Alliance	Scott Moore	437
Independent	Pauline McHenry	128
Independent	Corey French	104
Turnout		10,911
Independent gain from Sinn Féin		

The Moor
Party	Candidate	1st pref.
Independent	Gary Donnelly	1,374
SDLP	John Boyle	1,082
People Before Profit	Eamonn McCann	1,035
Sinn Féin	Patricia Logue	778
Sinn Féin	Tina Burke	738
Sinn Féin	Kevin Campbell	712
SDLP	Cathy Breslin	669
Sinn Féin	Sharon Duddy	594
Independent	Emmet Doyle	496
DUP	Niree McMorris	148
Alliance	Colm Cavanagh	122
Turnout		7,748
People Before Profit gain from Sinn Féin		

Waterside
Party	Candidate	1st pref.
UUP	Darren Guy	1,589
SDLP	Sinead McLaughlin	1,483
DUP	Hillary McClintock	1,250
SDLP	Martin Reilly	939
DUP	David Ramsey	839
Sinn Féin	Christopher Jackson	825
Sinn Féin	Sharon McLoughlin	784
DUP	Drew Thompson	780
People Before Profit	Maeve O'Neill	752
Alliance	Philip McKinney	715
Turnout		9,956
Alliance gain from DUP		

=== Fermanagh and Omagh ===
Enniskillen
Party	Candidate	1st pref.
DUP	Keith Elliot	1,161
SDLP	Paul Blake	955
Sinn Féin	Tommy Maguire	946
Sinn Féin	Debbie Coyle	761
UUP	Robert Irvine	753
Labour Alternative	Donal O'Cofaigh	720
UUP	Howard Thornton	651
TUV	Donald Crawford	492
DUP	Simon Wiggins	340
Alliance	Matthew Beaumont	310
Green (NI)	Debbie Coleman	136
Turnout		7,225
Labour Alternative gain from Sinn Féin		

Erne East
Party	Candidate	1st pref.
DUP	Paul Robinson	1,382
UUP	Victor Warrington	1,352
Independent	John McCluskey	1,286
Sinn Féin	Sheamus Greene	1,032
SDLP	Garbhan McPhillips	839
Sinn Féin	Thomas O'Reilly	829
Sinn Féin	Noeleen Hayes	738
Sinn Féin	Brian McCaffrey	620
Independent	Caroline Wheeler	204
Aontú	Gerry McHugh	174
Turnout		8,456
Independent gain from Sinn Féin		

Erne North
Party	Candidate	1st pref.
UUP	Diana Armstrong	1,186
Sinn Féin	Siobhan Currie	1,055
SDLP	John Coyle	911
Sinn Féin	John Feely	769
DUP	David Mahon	732
DUP	Deborah Armstrong	668
UUP	John McClaughry	630
TUV	Alex Elliott	465
Alliance	Diane Little	413
Democrats and Veterans	Lewis Jennings	20
Turnout		6,849
No change

Erne West
Party	Candidate	1st pref.
UUP	Alex Baird	1,333
Sinn Féin	Anthony Feely	1,208
Independent	Bernice Swift	1,159
Sinn Féin	Chris McCaffrey	1,136
Sinn Féin	Fionnuala Leonard	879
SDLP	Adam Gannon	611
DUP	Carol Johnston	547
Independent	Trevor Armstrong	512
Turnout		7,385
No change

Mid Tyrone
Party	Candidate	1st pref.
Sinn Féin	Padraigin Kelly	995
UUP	Bert Wilson	979
Sinn Féin	Catherine Kelly	964
DUP	James Managh	931
Independent	Emmet McAleer	897
Sinn Féin	Sean Clarke	889
Sinn Féin	Sean Donnelly	778
SDLP	Bernard McGrath	598
Aontú	Rosemarie Shields	464
Alliance	Richard Bullick	306
Sinn Féin	Kevin McColgan	287
Turnout		8,088
Independent gain from SDLP		

Omagh
Party	Candidate	1st pref.
DUP	Errol Thompson	970
Sinn Féin	Barry McElduff	900
Independent	Josephine Deehan	728
UUP	Chris Smyth	633
Alliance	Stephen Donnelly	616
Sinn Féin	Anne Marie Fitzgerald	589
Sinn Féin	Marty McColgan	509
SDLP	Jacinta McKeown	258
SDLP	Lee Hawkes	256
Independent	Sorcha McAnespy	194
Aontú	Margaret Swift	182
Green (NI)	Susan Glass	141
Independent	Joanne Donnelly	128
TUV	Charles Chittick	115
CISTA	Barry Brown	101
Independent	Will Convey	43
Turnout		6,363
Josephine Deehan leaves SDLP		
Alliance gain from SDLP		

West Tyrone
Party	Candidate	1st pref.
DUP	Mark Buchanan	1,546
UUP	Allan Rainey	1,095
SDLP	Mary Garrity	1,047
Sinn Féin	Glenn Campbell	983
Sinn Féin	Stephen McCann	839
Sinn Féin	Ann-Marie Donnelly	752
Sinn Féin	Frankie Donnelly	653
Alliance	Fia Cowan	390
Aontú	Cathal McCrory	242
Turnout		7,547
No change

=== Lisburn and Castlereagh ===
Castlereagh East
Party	Candidate	1st pref.
Alliance	Martin Gregg	1,212
DUP	Sharon Skillen	1,174
Alliance	Tim Morrow	936
DUP	David Drysdale	849
DUP	John Laverty	813
UUP	Hazel Legge	723
DUP	Tommy Jeffers	638
TUV	Andrew Girvin	637
Turnout		6,982
Alliance gain from TUV		

Castlereagh South
Party	Candidate	1st pref.
Alliance	Sorcha Eastwood	1,629
DUP	Nathan Anderson	1,503
Alliance	Michelle Guy	1,236
Sinn Féin	Ryan Carlin	1,069
SDLP	John Gallen	975
Green (NI)	Simon Lee	648
UUP	Michael Henderson	628
SDLP	Rachael McCarthy	463
DUP	Jason Elliott	335
Independent	Geraldine Rice	237
DUP	Vasundhara Kamble	208
TUV	Nicola Girvin	146
Turnout		9,077
Sinn Féin gain from SDLP		
Green gain from DUP		

Downshire East
Party	Candidate	1st pref.
Alliance	Aaron McIntyre	1,318
DUP	Andrew Gowan	1,133
UUP	James Baird	950
DUP	Uel Mackin	905
UUP	Alex Swan	726
DUP	Janet Gray	721
SDLP	Owen Beckett	422
Turnout		6,175
UUP gain from DUP		

Downshire West
Party	Candidate	1st pref.
Alliance	Owen Gawith	1,616
DUP	Caleb McCready	1,012
UUP	John Palmer	915
DUP	Allan Ewart	670
UUP	Jim Dillon	667
DUP	Vince Curry	647
SDLP	Morgan Crone	308
Green (NI)	Luke Robinson	230
NI Conservatives	Neil Johnston	169
Turnout		6,234
John Palmer leaves DUP		
No change

Killultagh
Party	Candidate	1st pref.
Alliance	David Honeyford	1,524
DUP	Thomas Beckett	1,006
Sinn Féin	Gary McCleave	994
DUP	James Tinsley	979
DUP	William Leathem	871
UUP	Ross McLernon	707
SDLP	Ally Haydock	695
UUP	Alexander Redpath	632
Independent	Stuart Brown	107
Turnout		7,515
Alliance gain from DUP		
Sinn Féin gain from SDLP		

Lisburn North
Party	Candidate	1st pref.
Alliance	Stephen Martin	1,483
DUP	Jonathan Craig	1,187
SDLP	Johnny McCarthy	852
DUP	Scott Carson	846
UUP	Nicholas Trimble	719
Sinn Féin	Joe Duffy	654
UUP	Stuart Hughes	578
DUP	Lindsay Reynolds	425
NI Conservatives	Gary Hynds	423
UKIP	Alan Love	156
Turnout		7,323
Johnny McCarthy leaves NI21		
UUP gain from DUP		

Lisburn South
Party	Candidate	1st pref.
Alliance	Amanda Grehan	929
UUP	Jenny Palmer	877
DUP	Andrew Ewing	738
DUP	Alan Givan	735
UUP	Tim Mitchell	715
DUP	Paul Porter	706
SDLP	Brendan Corr	649
Independent	Jonny Orr	534
TUV	Alison Chittick	384
DUP	Rhoda Walker	354
Democrats and Veterans	Ricky Taylor	242
UKIP	Helen Love	99
Turnout		6,962
UUP gain from DUP		

=== Mid and East Antrim ===
Ballymena
Party	Candidate	1st pref.
Independent	James Henry	872
SDLP	Eugene Reid	848
TUV	Matthew Armstrong	765
Alliance	Patricia O'Lynn	578
DUP	John Carson	527
Sinn Féin	Patrice Hardy	521
DUP	Reuben Glover	498
DUP	Audrey Wales	491
UUP	Stephen Nicholl	485
Independent	Rodney Quigley	433
DUP	William Logan	402
TUV	Philip Gordon	286
UKIP	Rab Picken	143
Independent	Conal Stewart	107
Turnout		6,956
Alliance gain from UUP		
Independent gain from DUP		

Bannside
Party	Candidate	1st pref.
TUV	Stewart McDonald	1,504
TUV	Timothy Gaston	1,433
Sinn Féin	Ian Friary	971
UUP	William McNeilly	783
Alliance	Philip Burnside	750
DUP	Andrew Wright	749
DUP	Thomas Gordon	744
DUP	Tommy Nicholl	690
UUP	Jackson Minford	449
Turnout		8,073
No change

Braid
Party	Candidate	1st pref.
UUP	Robin Cherry	1,084
DUP	Beth Adger	975
DUP	Julie Frew	926
TUV	Christopher Jamieson	902
TUV	Brian Collins	872
DUP	William McCaughey	825
UUP	Keith Turner	800
Alliance	Muriel Burnside	703
Sinn Féin	Collette McAllister	631
DUP	Sam Hanna	605
Independent	Marian Maguire	371
Independent	Roni Browne	146
Turnout		8,840
Alliance gain from Sinn Féin		
TUV gain from DUP		

Carrick Castle
Party	Candidate	1st pref.
Alliance	Lauren Gray	1,210
DUP	Billy Ashe	1,069
DUP	Cheryl Johnston	953
UUP	Robin Stewart	813
UUP	John McDermott	445
Independent	Noel Jordan	431
Democrats and Veterans	Si Harvey	265
Independent	Nicholas Wady	244
PUP	Jim McCaw	119
UKIP	John Kennedy	104
Turnout		5,653
Alliance gain from UKIP		
UUP gain from Independent		

Coast Road
Party	Candidate	1st pref.
Alliance	Gerardine Mulvenna	1,217
DUP	Andrew Clarke	973
Sinn Féin	James McKeown	873
DUP	Angela Smyth	764
UUP	Maureen Morrow	728
TUV	Ruth Wilson	601
Independent	Martin Wilson	460
Turnout		5,616
DUP gain from TUV		

Knockagh
Party	Candidate	1st pref.
Alliance	Noel Williams	1,173
DUP	Peter Johnston	967
DUP	Marc Collins	846
Independent	Bobby Hadden	798
UUP	Andrew Wilson	782
UUP	Lindsay Millar	624
TUV	May Beattie	328
PUP	David Barnett	185
Turnout		5,703
Independent gain from UUP		

Larne Lough
Party	Candidate	1st pref.
DUP	Gregg McKeen	1,166
Alliance	Danny Donnelly	1,057
UUP	Mark McKinty	983
DUP	Paul Reid	806
Alliance	Robert Logan	719
UUP	Andy Wilson	564
TUV	James Strange	435
Green (NI)	Robert Robinson	256
Turnout		5,986
Alliance gain from UUP		

=== Mid Ulster ===
Carntogher
Party	Candidate	1st pref.
Sinn Féin	Brian McGuigan	1,406
DUP	Kyle Black	1,228
Sinn Féin	Sean McPeake	1,164
SDLP	Martin Kearney	1,071
Sinn Féin	Cora Groogan	990
Sinn Féin	Paul Henry	763
Aontú	Pádraigín Uí Raifeartaigh	632
UUP	Christopher Reid	555
Independent	James Armour	138
Turnout		7,947
No change

Clogher Valley
Party	Candidate	1st pref.
DUP	Frances Burton	1,891
SDLP	Sharon McAleer	1,635
Sinn Féin	Sean McGuigan	1,494
Sinn Féin	Phelim Gildernew	1,352
DUP	Wills Robinson	1,083
UUP	Meta Graham	990
UUP	Robert Mulligan	650
Turnout		9,095
No change

Cookstown
Party	Candidate	1st pref.
Sinn Féin	Cathal Mallaghan	1,710
Sinn Féin	John McNamee	1,369
SDLP	Kerri Hughes	1,339
DUP	Wilbert Buchanan	1,225
UUP	Trevor Wilson	1,041
Sinn Féin	Gavin Bell	840
UUP	Mark Glasgow	793
DUP	Grace Neville	694
TUV	Alan Day	230
Turnout		9,241
No change

Dungannon
Party	Candidate	1st pref.
DUP	Clement Cuthbertson	1,833
Independent	Barry Monteith	1,414
Sinn Féin	Dominic Molloy	995
DUP	Kim Ashton	807
Sinn Féin	Deirdre Varsani	718
SDLP	Denise Mullen	710
UUP	Walter Cuddy	607
UUP	Kim McNeill	434
Alliance	Mel Boyle	431
Independent	Niall Bowen	345
Turnout		8,294
No change

Magherafelt
Party	Candidate	1st pref.
Sinn Féin	Darren Totten	1,665
DUP	Wesley Brown	1,218
SDLP	Christine McFlynn	1,206
DUP	Paul McLean	1,203
Sinn Féin	Sean Clarke	1,058
UUP	George Shiels	996
Aontú	Kevin Donnelly	214
Turnout		7,560
DUP gain from UUP		

Moyola
Party	Candidate	1st pref.
Sinn Féin	Ian Milne	1,710
DUP	Anne Forde	1,619
Sinn Féin	Catherine Elattar	1,388
UUP	Derek McKinney	937
SDLP	Denise Johnston	920
Sinn Féin	Donal McPeake	906
Alliance	Aidan Bradley	298
Workers' Party	Hugh Scullion	95
Turnout		7,873
No change

Torrent
Party	Candidate	1st pref.
SDLP	Malachy Quinn	1,631
Independent	Dan Kerr	1,525
Sinn Féin	Ronan McGinley	1,173
UUP	Robert Colvin	1,018
Sinn Féin	Niamh Doris	1,002
Sinn Féin	Joe O'Neill	994
DUP	Ian McCrea	899
Sinn Féin	Mickey Gillespie	856
Turnout		9,098
Independent gain from Sinn Féin		

=== Newry, Mourne and Down ===
Crotlieve
Party	Candidate	1st pref.
Independent	Jarlath Tinnelly	1,412
Sinn Féin	Gerry O'Hare	1,286
Independent	Mark Gibbons	1,189
SDLP	Declan McAteer	1,175
SDLP	Karen McKevitt	1,116
Sinn Féin	Mickey Ruane	812
Sinn Féin	Oksana McMahon	809
SDLP	Michael Carr	808
Independent	Jim Boylan	788
UUP	Joshua Lowry	712
Sinn Féin	Mary Tinnelly	519
Alliance	Lorcán McGreevy	483
DUP	Wilma McCullough	371
Turnout		11,480
Independent gain from SDLP		

Downpatrick
Party	Candidate	1st pref.
SDLP	Gareth Sharvin	1,395
Independent	Cadogan Enright	1,052
Sinn Féin	Oonagh Hanlon	1,032
SDLP	Dermot Curran	940
Sinn Féin	Jordan Madden	833
SDLP	John Trainor	664
Aontú	Macartán Digney	475
Alliance	Tiernan Laird	375
UUP	Alex Burgess	345
DUP	James Savage	149
Green (NI)	Jamie Kennedy	128
Turnout		7,388
No change

Newry
Party	Candidate	1st pref.
Independent	Gavin Malone	2,296
Sinn Féin	Liz Kimmins	1,374
SDLP	Michael Savage	1,231
Sinn Féin	Charlie Casey	1,230
Sinn Féin	Valerie Harte	1,045
SDLP	Gary Stokes	878
Sinn Féin	Sarah McAllister	784
Alliance	Helena Young	721
UUP	Ricky McGaffin	341
Turnout		9,900
No change

Rowallane
Party	Candidate	1st pref.
Alliance	Patrick Brown	1,416
DUP	Harry Harvey	1,265
SDLP	Terry Andrews	1,211
DUP	William Walker	985
UUP	Robert Burgess	842
UUP	Walter Lyons	667
Sinn Féin	Marianne Cleary	622
Independent	Martyn Todd	477
Green (NI)	Emma Cairns	182
Aontú	Liam Mulhern	99
Turnout		7,766
No change

Slieve Croob
Party	Candidate	1st pref.
UUP	Alan Lewis	1,303
Sinn Féin	Cathy Mason	1,069
Sinn Féin	Roisin Howell	1,035
Sinn Féin	John Rice	884
SDLP	Hugh Gallagher	880
DUP	Maynard Hanna	868
Alliance	Gregory Bain	863
SDLP	Mark Murnin	796
Aontú	Tracy Harkin	481
Turnout		8,179
UUP gain from DUP		

Slieve Gullion
Party	Candidate	1st pref.
Sinn Féin	Terry Hearty	1,876
Sinn Féin	Mickey Larkin	1,646
SDLP	Pete Byrne	1,643
Sinn Féin	Oonagh Magennis	1,622
Sinn Féin	Roisín Mulgrew	1,362
Sinn Féin	Barra O'Muirí	1,351
UUP	David Taylor	1,287
SDLP	Kate Loughran	1,059
Alliance	Balázs Gazdag	361
DUP	Linda Henry	315
Turnout		12,522
Sinn Féin gain from SDLP		

The Mournes
Party	Candidate	1st pref.
DUP	Glyn Hanna	1,944
Sinn Féin	Sean Doran	1,885
SDLP	Laura Devlin	1,572
UUP	Harold McKee	1,455
Independent	Henry Reilly	1,447
Sinn Féin	Willie Clarke	1,154
Sinn Féin	Leeanne McAvoy	1,097
Alliance	Andrew McMurray	943
SDLP	Brian Quinn	607
Turnout		12,104
Henry Reilly leaves UKIP		
Sinn Féin gain from SDLP		

== See also ==
- 2019 United Kingdom local elections
