= 2019 Irish elections =

2019 Irish elections may refer to:

== Republic of Ireland ==
- 2019 Irish local elections
- 2019 European Parliament election in Ireland

== Northern Ireland ==
- 2019 Northern Ireland local elections
