= 2019 Lisburn and Castlereagh City Council election =

2019 Northern Irish local government election

- 2 May 2019

All 40 council seats 21 seats needed for a majority
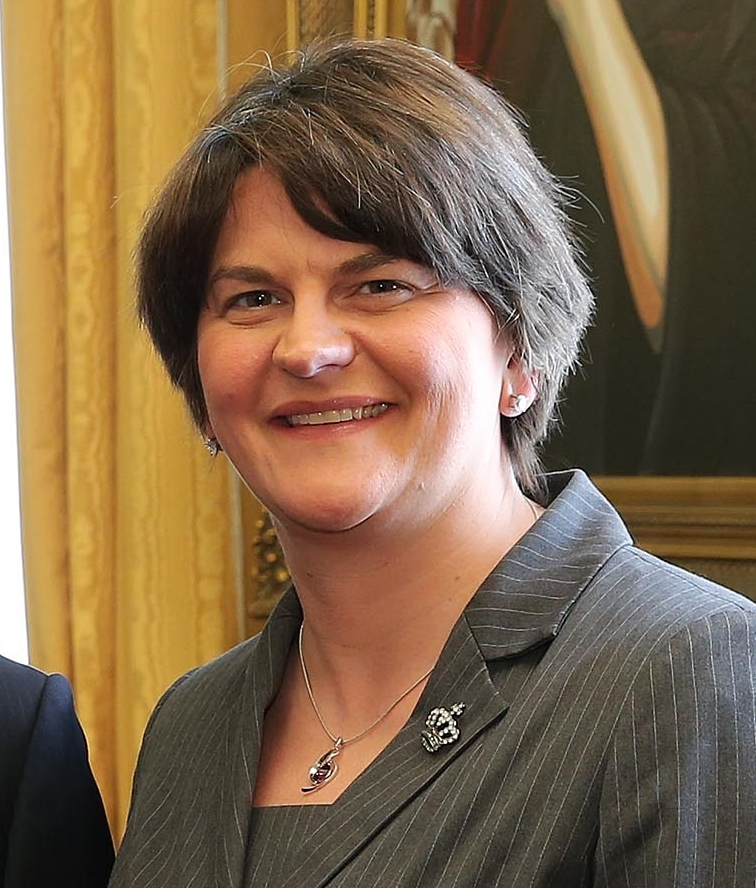

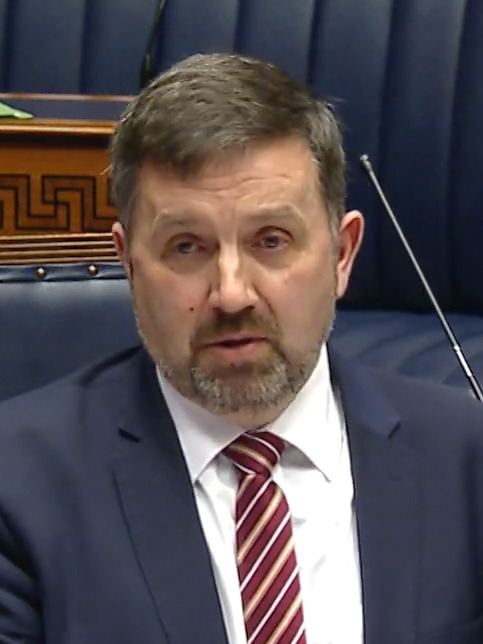

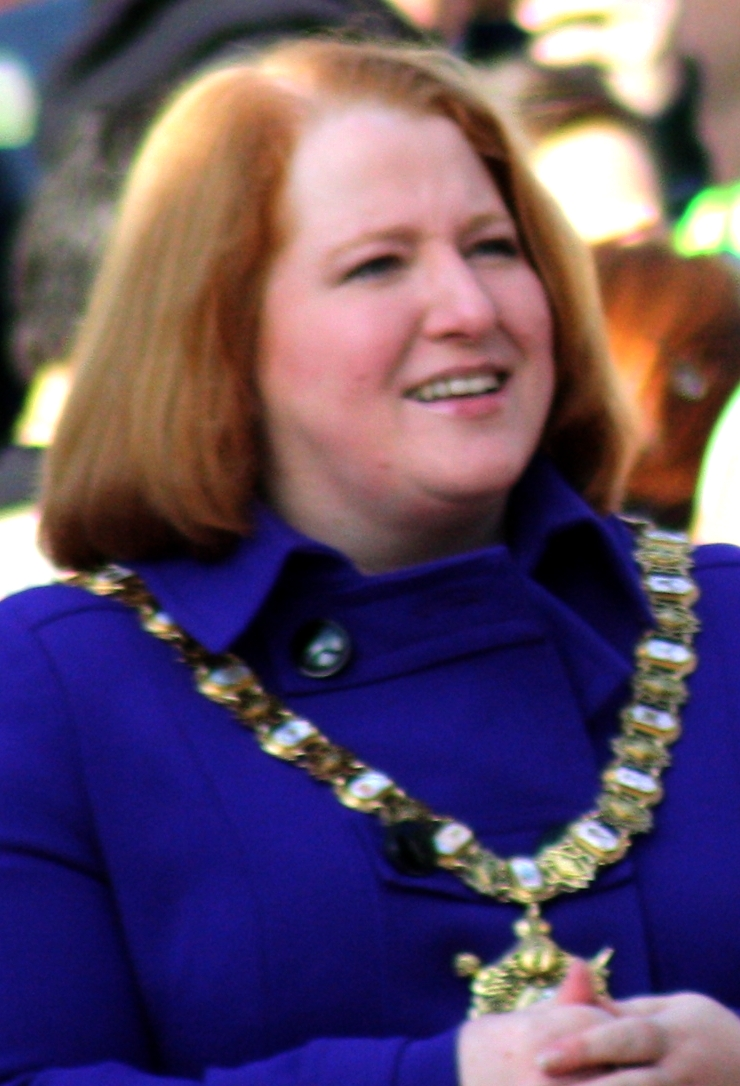

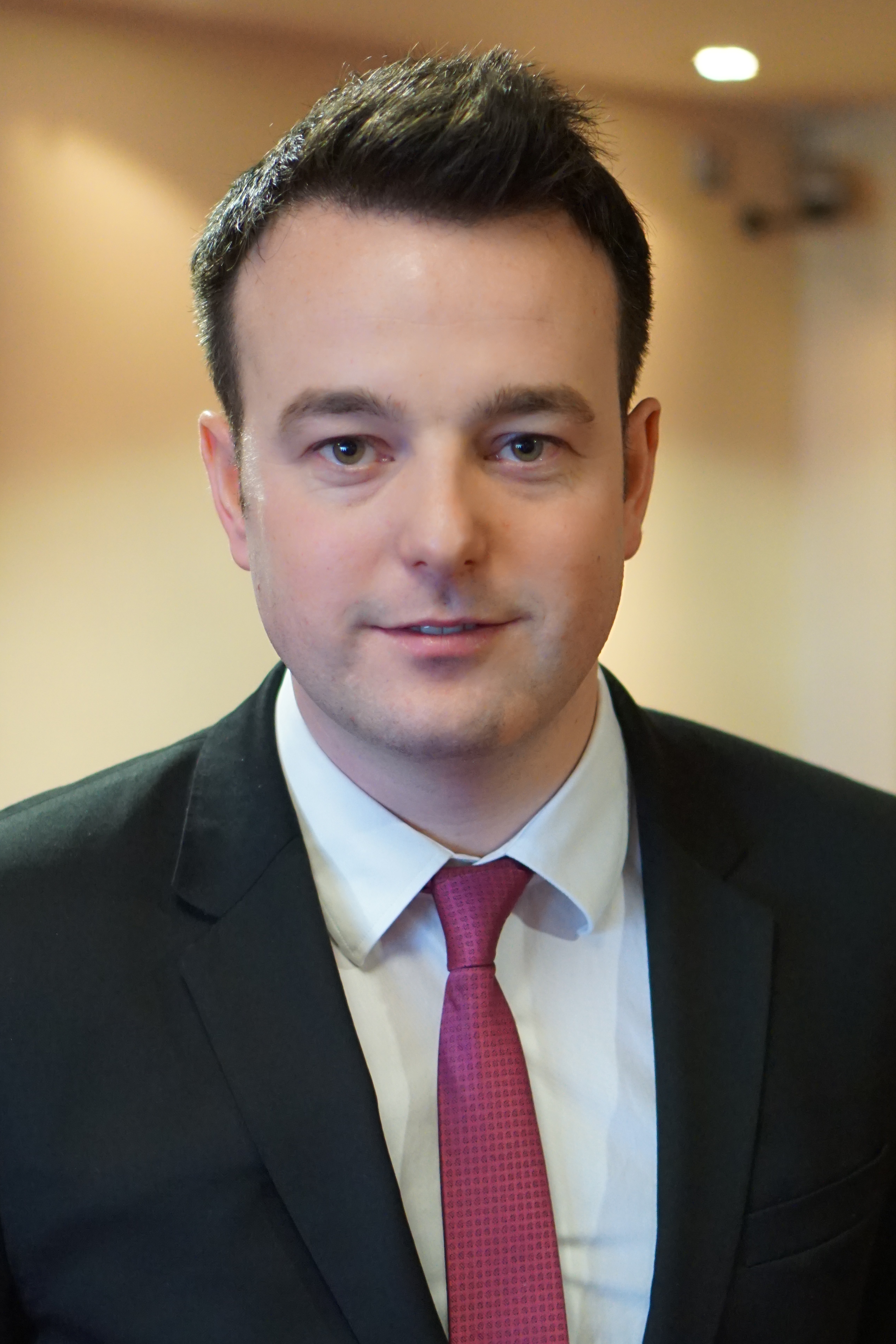

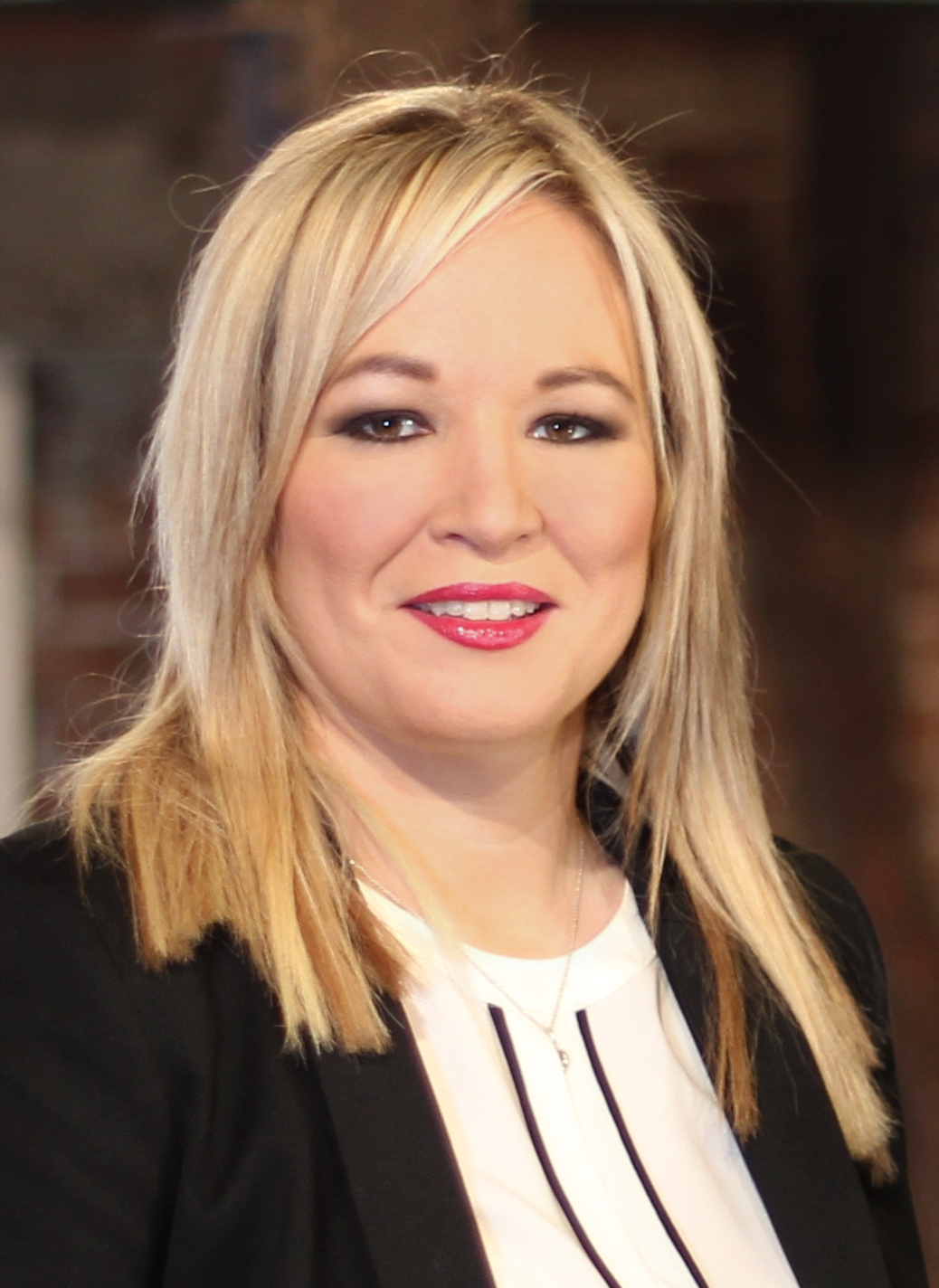

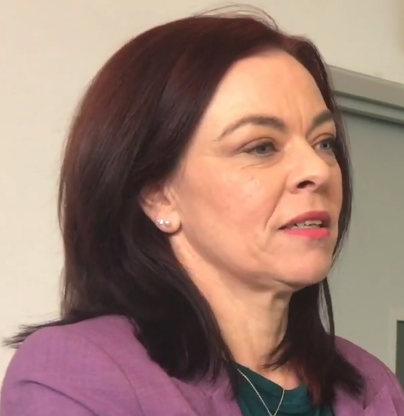

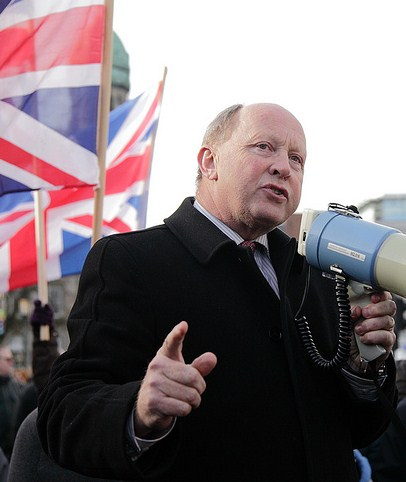

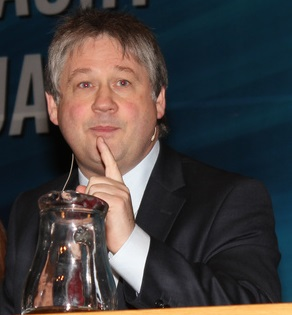
	First party	Second party	Third party
Leader	Arlene Foster	Robin Swann	Naomi Long
Party	DUP	UUP	Alliance
Seats before	20	8	7
Seats won	15	11	9
Seat change	▼5	▲3	▲2
	Fourth party	Fifth party	Sixth party
Leader	Colum Eastwood	Michelle O'Neill (Note: The leader of Sinn Féin is Mary Lou McDonald, who sits as a TD in the Irish Dáil Éireann for Dublin Central. O'Neill is the leader of the party in Northern Ireland.)	Clare Bailey
Party	SDLP	Sinn Féin	Green (NI)
Seats before	3	0	0
Seats won	2	2	1
Seat change	▼1	▲2	▲1
	Seventh party	Eighth party
Leader	Jim Allister	Basil McCrea
Party	TUV	NI21
Seats before	1	1
Seats won	0	0
Seat change	▼1	▼1
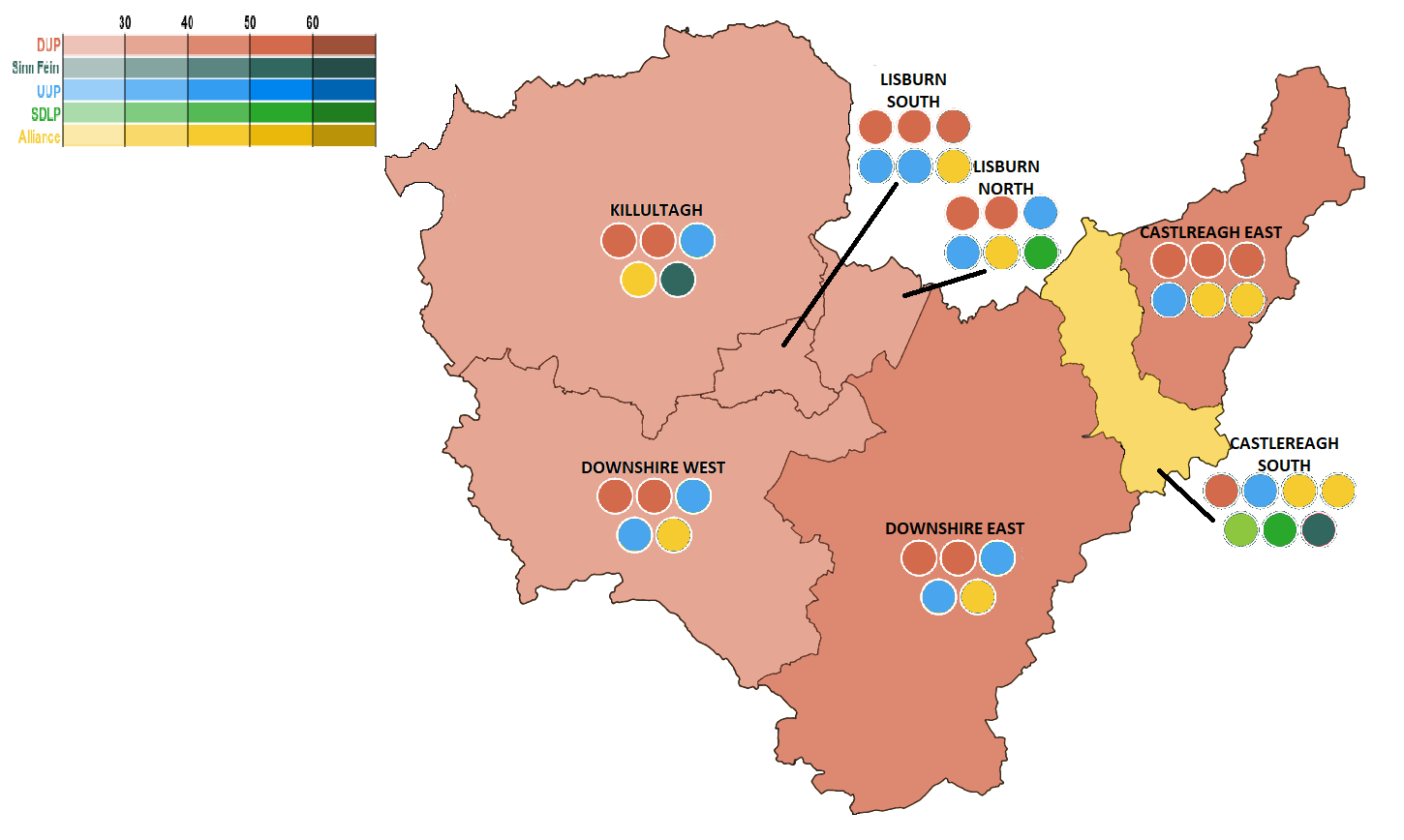
- Lisburn and Castlereagh 2019 Council Election Results by DEA (Shaded by plurality of FPVs)

The 2019 Lisburn and Castlereagh City Council election was the second election to Lisburn and Castlereagh city Council, part of the Northern Ireland local elections on 2 May 2019, which returned 40 members to the Lisburn and Castlereagh city Council via Single Transferable Vote.

== Election results ==
Lisburn and Castlereagh City Council Election Result 2019
Party	Seats	Gains	Losses	Net gain/loss	Seats %	Votes %	Votes	+/−
DUP	15	0	5	▼5	37.5	36.7	18,455	▼3.7
UUP	11	3	0	▲3	27.5	17.6	8,837	▲1.6
Alliance	9	2	0	▲2	22.5	23.6	11,883	▲11.6
SDLP	2	1	2	▼1	5.0	8.7	4,364	▲0.7
Sinn Féin	2	2	0	▲2	5.0	5.4	2,717	▲0.7
Green (NI)	1	1	0	▲1	2.5	1.7	878	▲0.2
TUV	0	0	1	▼1	0.0	2.3	1,167	▼3.6
Independent	0	0	0	0	0.0	1.7	878	▲1.3
NI Conservatives	0	0	0	0	0.0	1.2	592	▲0.5
UKIP	0	0	0	0	0.0	0.5	255	▼1.3
Democrats and Veterans	0	0	0	0	0.0	0.5	242	New
NI21	0	0	1	▼1	0.0	0.0	0	▼6.9

Note: "Votes" are the first preference votes.

The overall turnout was 49.21% with a total of 50,268 valid votes cast. A total of 479 ballots were rejected.

== Districts summary ==
Results of the Lisburn and Castlereagh City Council election, 2019 by district
Electoral Area	%	Cllrs	%	Cllrs	%	Cllrs	%	Cllrs	%	Cllrs	%	Cllrs	Total Cllrs
Electoral Area	DUP		UUP		Alliance		SDLP		Sinn Féin		Others		Total Cllrs
Castlereagh East	49.8	3	10.4	1	30.8	2	0.0	0	0.0	0	9.1	0	6
Castlereagh South	22.5	1	6.9	1	31.6	2	15.8	1	11.8	1	11.3	1	7
Downshire East	44.7	2	27.1	2	21.3	1	6.8	0	0.0	0	0.0	0	5
Downshire West	37.4	2	25.4	2	25.9	1	4.9	0	0.0	0	6.4	0	5
Killultagh	38.0	2	17.8	1	20.3	1	9.2	0	13.2	1	1.4	0	5
Lisburn North	33.6	2	17.7	2	20.3	1	11.6	1	8.9	0	7.9	0	6
Lisburn South	36.4	3	22.9	2	13.3	1	9.3	0	0.0	0	18.1	0	6
Total	36.7	15	17.6	11	23.6	9	8.7	2	5.4	2	7.9	1	40

== District results ==
=== Castlereagh East ===
2014: 3 x DUP, 1 x Alliance, 1 x UUP, 1 x TUV
2019: 3 x DUP, 2 x Alliance, 1 x UUP
2014-2019 Change: Alliance gain from TUV

Castlereagh East - 6 seats
Party	Candidate	FPv%	Count				
Party	Candidate	FPv%	1	2	3	4	5
Alliance	Martin Gregg	17.36%	1,212				
DUP	Sharon Skillen*	16.81%	1,174				
Alliance	Tim Morrow* †	13.41%	936	1,128.78			
DUP	David Drysdale*	12.16%	849	850.19	951.14	956.92	1,081.92
UUP	Hazel Legge*	10.36%	723	728.1	736.65	808.9	1,040.9
DUP	John Laverty	11.64%	813	814.19	847.04	851.8	976.8
DUP	Tommy Jeffers*	9.14%	638	640.72	666.67	672.79	768.79
TUV	Andrew Girvin*	9.12%	637	637.85	644.15	656.39	
Electorate: 14,963 Valid: 6,982 (46.66%) Spoilt: 65 Quota: 998 Turnout: 7,047 (47.10%)

=== Castlereagh South ===
2014: 2 x Alliance, 2 x DUP, 2 x SDLP, 1 x UUP
2019: 2 x Alliance, 1 x DUP, 1 x SDLP, 1 x UUP, 1 x Sinn Féin, 1 x Green
2014-2019 Change: Sinn Féin and Green gain from DUP and SDLP

Castlereagh South - 7 seats
Party	Candidate	FPv%	Count									
Party	Candidate	FPv%	1	2	3	4	5	6	7	8	9	10
Alliance	Sorcha Eastwood †	17.95%	1,629									
DUP	Nathan Anderson* ‡	16.55%	1,503									
Alliance	Michelle Guy	13.62%	1,236									
SDLP	John Gallen*	10.74%	975	1,094.68	1,099.96	1,128.12	1,130.12	1,131.68	1,165.68			
Sinn Féin	Ryan Carlin	11.78%	1,069	1,107.4	1,109.32	1,115.48	1,115.48	1,117.8	1,129.92	1,263.92		
Green (NI)	Simon Lee ‡	7.14%	648	819.52	825.04	858.96	863.84	868.96	946.2	1,168.2		
UUP	Michael Henderson*	6.92%	628	657.76	683.44	690.88	759	789.12	869.52	920.92	940.92	971.6
DUP	Jason Elliott	3.69%	335	338.84	585.56	586.28	634.32	856.92	873.2	886.16	890.16	892.52
SDLP	Rachael McCarthy	5.10%	463	544.6	545.08	552.84	552.84	555.8	598.32			
Independent	Geraldine Rice*	2.61%	237	277.32	283.32	289.56	294.12	303.76				
DUP	Vasundhara Kamble*	2.29%	208	221.2	260.4	261.84	287.52					
TUV	Nicola Girvan	1.61%	146	148.88	161.6	161.92						
Electorate: 17,351 Valid: 9,077 (52.31%) Spoilt: 53 Quota: 1,135 Turnout: 9,130 (52.62%)

=== Downshire East ===
2014: 3 x DUP, 1 x UUP, 1 x Alliance
2019: 2 x DUP, 2 x UUP, 1 x Alliance
2014-2019 Change: UUP gain from DUP

Downshire East - 5 seats
Party	Candidate	FPv%	Count		
Party	Candidate	FPv%	1	2	3
Alliance	Aaron McIntyre*	21.34%	1,318		
DUP	Andrew Gowan	18.35%	1,133		
UUP	James Baird*	15.38%	950	1,003.75	1,081.75
UUP	Alex Swan	11.76%	726	787.5	930.5
DUP	Uel Mackin*	14.66%	905	911.25	920.75
DUP	Janet Gray*	11.68%	721	731.5	741.5
SDLP	Owen Beckett	6.83%	422	574.5	
Electorate: 12,214 Valid: 6,175 (50.56%) Spoilt: 47 Quota: 1,030 Turnout: 6,222 (50.94%)

=== Downshire West ===
2014: 2 x DUP, 2 x UUP, 1 x Alliance
2019: 2 x DUP, 2 x UUP, 1 x Alliance
2014-2019 Change: No change

Downshire West - 5 seats
Party	Candidate	FPv%	Count						
Party	Candidate	FPv%	1	2	3	4	5	6	7
Alliance	Owen Gawith*	25.92%	1,616						
DUP	Caleb McCready	16.23%	1,012	1,029.76	1,060.76				
UUP	John Palmer*	14.68%	915	988.26	1,038.95	1,039.74	1,081.74		
UUP	Jim Dillon*	10.70%	667	722.87	767.97	771.92	842.03	871.03	1,071.06
DUP	Allan Ewart*	10.75%	670	678.51	686.62	693.73	706.58	710.58	715.8
DUP	Vince Curry	10.38%	647	652.92	657.66	663.98	669.09	670.09	682.53
SDLP	Morgan Crone	4.94%	308	458.96	473.62	474.41	664.58	669.58	
Green (NI)	Luke Robinson	3.69%	230	416.11	471.79	473.37			
NI Conservatives	Neil Johnston	2.71%	169	234.86					
Electorate: 12,385 Valid: 6,234 (50.34%) Spoilt: 67 Quota: 1,040 Turnout: 6,301 (50.88%)

=== Killultagh ===
2014: 3 x DUP, 1 x UUP, 1 x SDLP
2019: 2 x DUP, 1 x UUP, 1 x Alliance, 1 x Sinn Féin
2014-2019 Change: Alliance and Sinn Féin gain from DUP and SDLP

Killultagh - 5 seats
Party	Candidate	FPv%	Count						
Party	Candidate	FPv%	1	2	3	4	5	6	7
Alliance	David Honeyford †	20.30%	1,524						
UUP	Ross McLernon	9.40%	707	729	775.8	1,313.8			
Sinn Féin	Gary McCleave	13.22%	994	996	1,022.8	1,024.8	1,025.22	1,438.22	
DUP	Thomas Beckett*	14.18%	1,006	1,018	1,024.6	1,047.4	1,058.88	1,091.66	1,115.66
DUP	James Tinsley*	13.03%	979	988	993.8	1,032.8	1,057.3	1,079.28	1,102.28
DUP	William Leathem*	10.87%	871	885	891.2	909.4	923.4	925.16	944.16
SDLP	Ally Haydock	9.25%	695	717	863.3	884.6	891.46		
UUP	Alexander Redpath*	8.41%	632	639	667.2				
Independent	Stuart Brown	1.42%	107						
Electorate: 14,361 Valid: 7,515 (52.33%) Spoilt: 76 Quota: 1,253 Turnout: 7,591 (52.86%)

=== Lisburn North ===
2014: 3 x DUP, 1 x UUP, 1 x Alliance, 1 x NI21
2019: 2 x DUP, 2 x UUP, 1 x Alliance, 1 x SDLP
2014-2019 Change: UUP gain from DUP, NI21 joins SDLP

Lisburn North - 6 seats
Party	Candidate	FPv%	Count						
Party	Candidate	FPv%	1	2	3	4	5	6	7
Alliance	Stephen Martin*	20.25%	1,483						
DUP	Jonathan Craig*	16.21%	1,187						
SDLP	Johnny McCarthy*	11.63%	852	1,100.62					
DUP	Scott Carson*	11.55%	846	856.56	883.2	951.51	951.81	1,060.81	
UUP	Nicholas Trimble*	9.82%	719	786.52	808.52	812.04	824.64	950.14	1,077.14
UUP	Stuart Hughes	7.89%	578	619.92	659.56	665.72	673.32	789.61	1,058.61
Sinn Féin	Joe Duffy	8.93%	654	680.24	685.88	686.43	710.13	716.13	717.13
DUP	Lindsay Reynolds	5.80%	425	429.8	449.12	497.19	497.99	559.04	
NI Conservatives	Gary Hynds	5.78%	423	443.8	467.72	469.7	475.1		
UKIP	Alan Love	2.13%	156	162.08					
Electorate: 15,356 Valid: 7,323 (47.69%) Spoilt: 89 Quota: 1,047 Turnout: 7,412 (48.27%)

=== Lisburn South ===
2014: 4 x DUP, 1 x UUP, 1 x Alliance
2019: 3 x DUP, 2 x UUP, 1 x Alliance
2014-2019 Change: UUP gain from DUP

Lisburn South - 6 seats
Party	Candidate	FPv%	Count					
Party	Candidate	FPv%	1	2	3	4	5	6
UUP	Jenny Palmer	12.60%	877	924	942	1,022		
DUP	Andrew Ewing*	10.60%	738	758	895	997		
Alliance	Amanda Grehan*	13.34%	929	947	949	965	1,176	
UUP	Tim Mitchell*	10.27%	715	742	758	859	969	1,010
DUP	Paul Porter*	10.14%	706	748	857	906	942	944
DUP	Alan Givan*	10.56%	735	758	825	890	934	940
SDLP	Brendan Corr	9.32%	649	654	655	661	738	822
Independent	Jonny Orr	7.67%	534	578	589	615		
TUV	Alison Chittick	5.52%	384	466	477			
DUP	Rhoda Walker*	5.08%	354	376				
Democrats and Veterans	Ricky Taylor	3.48%	242					
UKIP	Helen Love	1.42%	99					
Electorate: 15,521 Valid: 6,962 (44.86%) Spoilt: 82 Quota: 995 Turnout: 7,044 (45.38%)

== Changes during the term ==
=== † Co-options ===
Date co-opted	Electoral Area	Party	Outgoing	Co-optee	Reason
31 January 2020	Castlereagh East	Alliance	Tim Morrow	Sharon Lowry	Morrow resigned.
26 May 2022	Castlereagh South	Alliance	Sorcha Eastwood	Fiona Cole	Eastwood was elected to the Northern Ireland Assembly.
26 May 2022	Killultagh	Alliance	David Honeyford	Sian Mulholland	Honeyford was elected to the Northern Ireland Assembly.
4 April 2023	Killultagh	Alliance	Sian Mulholland	Vacant	Mulholland co-opted into Assembly to replace Patricia O'Lynn - not replaced before May 2023 council election.

=== ‡ Changes in affiliation ===
Date	Electoral Area	Name	Previous affiliation	New affiliation	Circumstance
28 September 2021	Castlereagh South	Nathan Anderson	DUP	Independent	Left the DUP believing it did not take a firm enough position against abortion.
4 August 2022	Castlereagh South	Simon Lee	Green (NI)	SDLP	Left the Green Party and joined the SDLP.

=== – Suspensions ===
None

Last update 5 August 2022.

Current composition: see Lisburn and Castlereagh.
