= 2014 Lisburn and Castlereagh City Council election =

2014 Northern Irish local government election

- 22 May 2014

All 40 council seats 21 seats needed for a majority
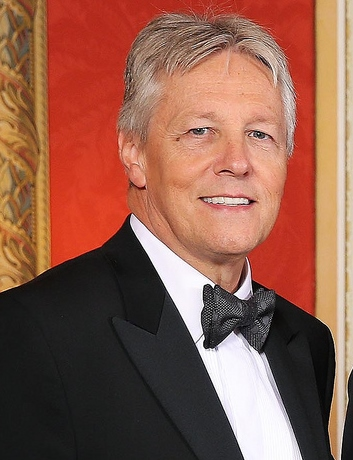

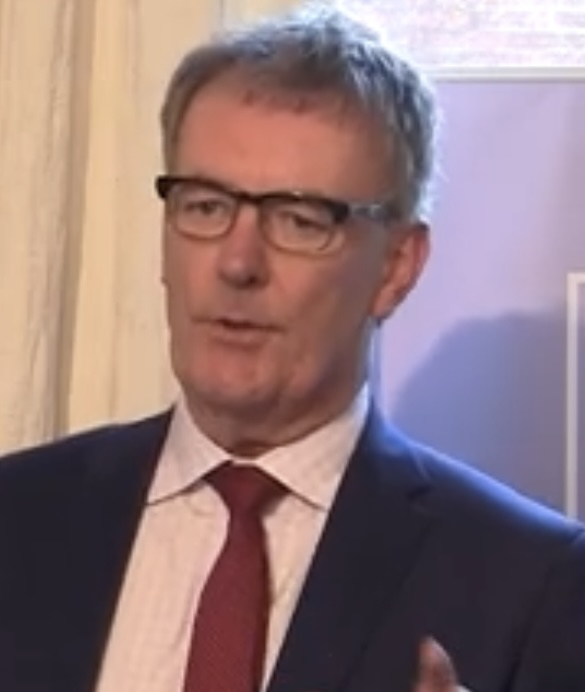

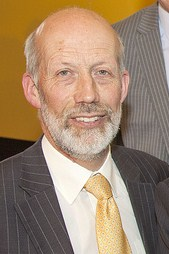

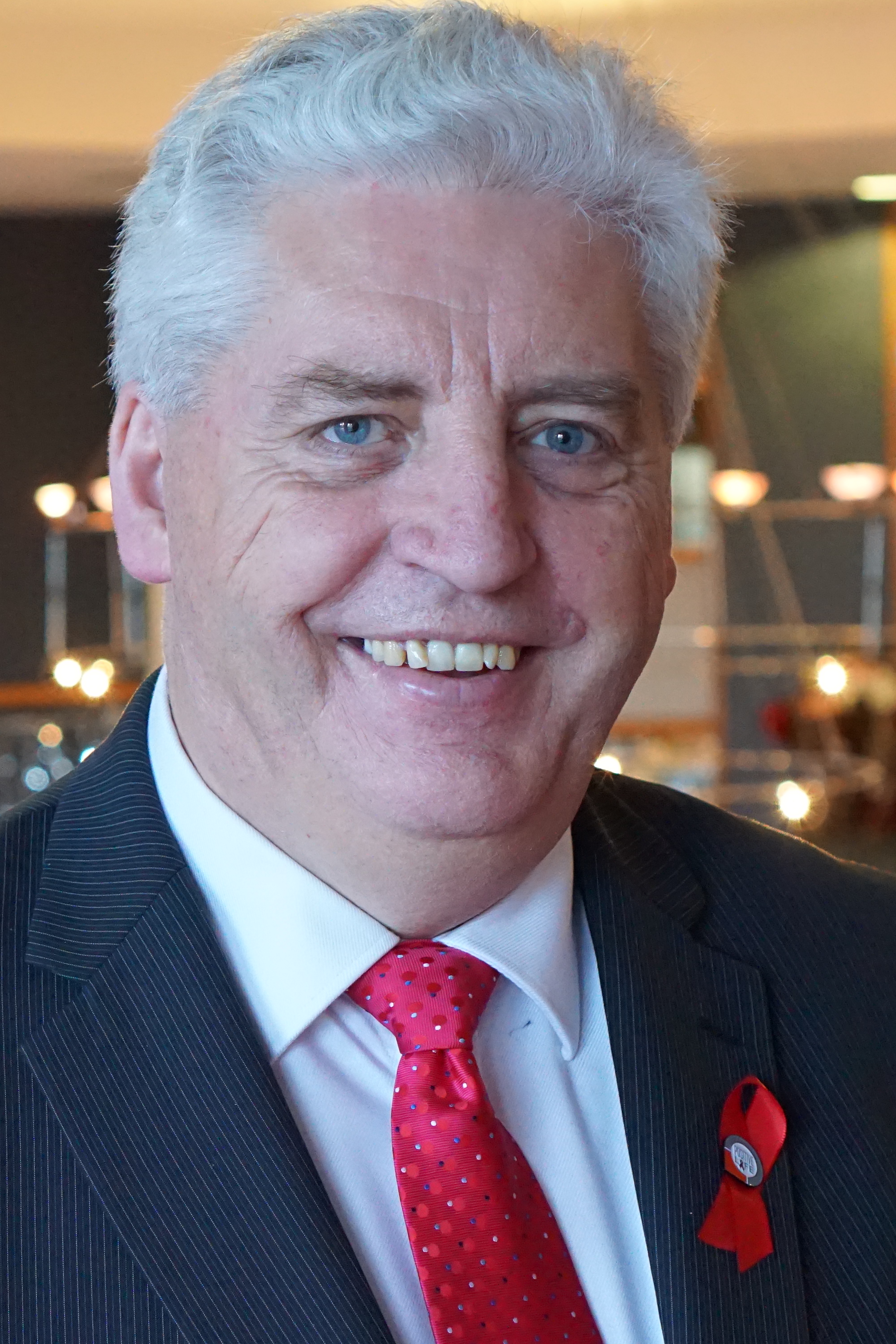

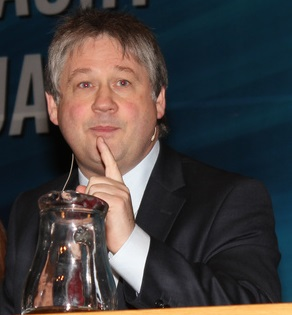

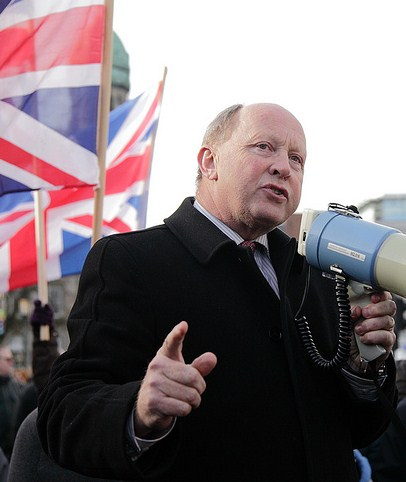
	First party	Second party	Third party
Leader	Peter Robinson	Mike Nesbitt	David Ford
Party	DUP	UUP	Alliance
Seats won	20	8	7
Seat change	New council	New council	New council
	Fourth party	Fifth party	Sixth party
Leader	Alasdair McDonnell	Basil McCrea	Jim Allister
Party	SDLP	NI21	TUV
Seats won	3	1	1
Seat change	New council	New council	New council
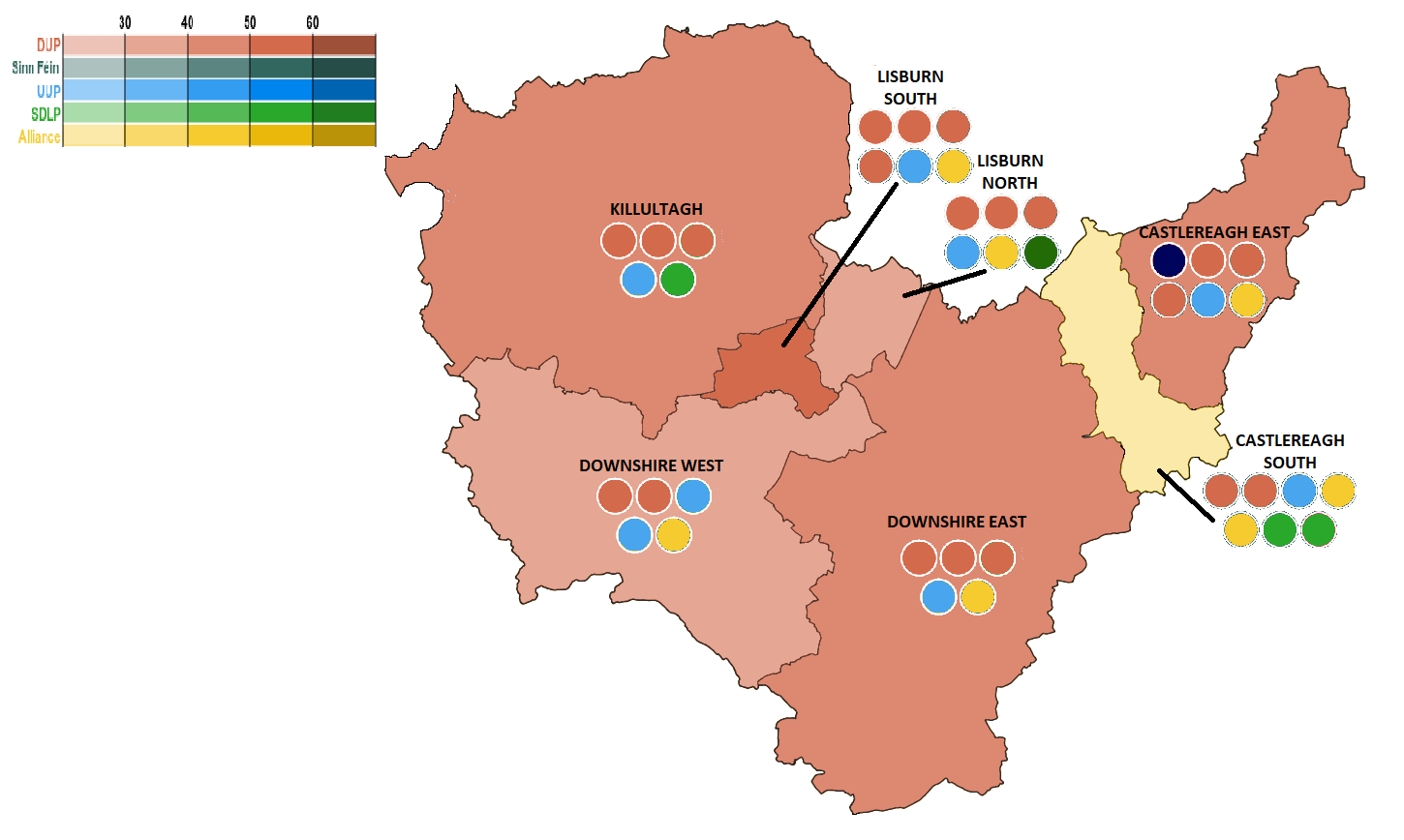
- Lisburn and Castlereagh Council 2014 Council Election Results by DEA (Shaded by plurality of FPVs)

The first election to Lisburn and Castlereagh City Council, part of the Northern Ireland local elections on 22 May 2014, returned 40 members to the newly formed council via Single Transferable Vote. The Democratic Unionist Party won half of the seats.

== Election results ==
Party	Seats	First Pref. votes	FPv%
DUP	20	18,520	40.46
UUP	8	7,311	15.97
Alliance	7	5,492	12.00
SDLP	3	3,658	7.99
NI21	1	3,173	6.93
TUV	1	2,720	5.94
Sinn Féin	0	2,150	4.70
UKIP	0	824	1.80
Green (NI)	0	699	1.53
PUP	0	695	1.52
NI Conservatives	0	376	0.82
Independent	0	169	0.37
Totals	40	45,777	100.00

== Districts summary ==
Results of the Lisburn and Castlereagh City Council election, 2014 by district
Ward	%	Cllrs	%	Cllrs	%	Cllrs	%	Cllrs	%	Cllrs	%	Cllrs	%	Cllrs	%	Cllrs	Total Cllrs
Ward	DUP		UUP		Alliance		SDLP		NI21		TUV		Sinn Féin		Others		Total Cllrs
Castlereagh East	48.4	3	8.8	1	12.5	1	0.0	0	0.0	0	10.4	1	0.0	0	19.9	0	6
Castlereagh South	22.2	2	11.1	1	23.3	2	22.7	2	4.4	0	6.4	0	9.9	0	0.0	0	7
Downshire East	47.0	3	19.5	1	11.5	1	0.0	0	11.6	0	6.9	0	0.0	0	3.5	0	5
Downshire West	34.6	2	27.4	2	8.5	1	4.0	0	6.1	0	5.8	0	0.0	0	13.6	0	5
Killultagh	44.6	3	18.2	1	7.0	0	10.8	1	6.2	0	0.0	0	13.2	0	0.0	0	5
Lisburn North	37.5	3	16.0	1	10.7	1	7.0	0	8.6	1	4.5	0	7.5	0	8.2	0	6
Lisburn South	53.6	4	14.0	1	6.9	1	6.8	0	8.9	0	7.5	0	0.0	0	2.3	0	6
Total	40.4	20	16.0	8	12.0	7	8.0	3	6.9	1	5.9	1	4.7	0	6.1	0	40

== District results ==
=== Castlereagh East ===
2014: 3 x DUP, 1 x Alliance, 1 x TUV, 1 x UUP

Castlereagh East - 6 seats
Party	Candidate	FPv%	Count							
Party	Candidate	FPv%	1	2	3	4	5	6	7	8
DUP	Tommy Jeffers*	13.37%	881	886	897	903	978			
Alliance	Tim Morrow*	7.91%	521	537	566	836	852	1,065		
DUP	David Drysdale*	12.49%	823	834	849	858	923	961		
TUV	Andrew Girvin	10.37%	683	702	711	716	853	897	908	1,159
DUP	Sharon Skillen*	11.95%	787	792	798	801	855	891	903	1,155
UUP	Hazel Legge	8.81%	580	608	634	645	733	837	880	1,131
DUP	Lynda Spratt	10.63%	700	717	724	726	737	747	754	
Green (NI)	Martin Gregg*	6.71%	442	450	492	537	579			
PUP	Izzy Giles	7.47%	492	496	506	516				
Alliance	Stephen Donnan	4.57%	301	306	369					
NI21	Mark Devenney	3.66%	241	247						
Independent	Robert Campbell	1.14%	75							
Independent	Sandra Wilson	0.93%	61							
Electorate: 13,645 Valid: 6,587 (48.27%) Spoilt: 103 Quota: 942 Turnout: 6,690 (49.03%)

=== Castlereagh South ===
2014: 2 x Alliance, 2 x SDLP, 2 x DUP, 1 x UUP

Castlereagh South - 7 seats
Party	Candidate	FPv%	Count						
Party	Candidate	FPv%	1	2	3	4	5	6	7
Alliance	Geraldine Rice* ‡	15.06%	1,221						
SDLP	John Gallen	11.89%	964	967	981.96	1,015.3			
DUP	Nathan Anderson	11.62%	942	943	945.38	958.38	1,020.38		
UUP	Michael Henderson*	11.12%	902	904	912.84	968.52	995.37	1,277.37	
DUP	Ben Mallon	6.15%	499	499	500.02	514.02	757.7	926.06	1,091.06
Alliance	Vasundhara Kamble* ‡‡	8.25%	669	671	811.25	948.33	951.5	974.18	988.18
SDLP	Brian Hanvey*	10.80%	876	876	893.34	914.85	915.85	924.36	932.36
Sinn Féin	Nuala Toman	9.90%	803	803	809.8	822.97	823.97	823.97	823.97
TUV	Wallace Douglas	6.41%	520	521	523.72	537.89	544.89		
DUP	Vikki Nelson*	4.43%	359	360	361.7	365.87			
NI21	Elizabeth McCord	3.58%	290	346	353.31				
NI21	Adam Murray	0.85%	69						
Electorate: 16,309 Valid: 8,110 (49.73%) Spoilt: 88 Quota: 1,015 Turnout: 8,198 (50.27%)

=== Downshire East ===
2014: 3 x DUP, 1 x UUP, 1 x Alliance

Downshire East - 5 seats
Party	Candidate	FPv%	Count									
Party	Candidate	FPv%	1	2	3	4	5	6	7	8	9	10
DUP	Luke Poots*	20.78%	1,245									
DUP	Uel Mackin*	12.25%	734	778.4	798.2	806.8	1,058.8					
UUP	James Baird*	12.25%	734	748.6	787.8	799	825.4	829	1,156			
DUP	Janet Gray	8.01%	480	594	611.4	617	709.2	757.92	824.84	1,074.84		
Alliance	Aaron McIntyre	11.54%	691	693.8	711.8	747.2	753.4	753.88	779.28	804.88	866.88	880.88
NI21	Christina Dobson	7.11%	426	430.8	450	646.2	654.4	654.88	673.92	722.48	810.48	860.48
TUV	Tom Mateer	6.89%	413	418.8	467.2	470.4	484	485.92	517.24			
UUP	Alex Swan	7.21%	432	442.8	451.2	462.4	483.2	485.36				
DUP	Roy Young*	6.19%	371	412.6	427.2	427.8						
NI21	Glenn Wilson	4.52%	271	274.2	279.2							
UKIP	Peter Lindsay	3.32%	199	202								
Electorate: 11,563 Valid: 5,990 (51.80%) Spoilt: 72 Quota: 1,000 Turnout: 6,062 (52.43%)

=== Downshire West ===
2014: 2 x DUP, 2 x UUP, 1 x Alliance

Downshire West - 5 seats
Party	Candidate	FPv%	Count									
Party	Candidate	FPv%	1	2	3	4	5	6	7	8	9	10
UUP	Jim Dillon*	15.80%	912	914	921	936	975					
DUP	Allan Ewart*	15.25%	880	883	883	886	914	915.32	1,049.32			
DUP	John Palmer* ‡	13.31%	768	771	773	775	808	809.32	972.32			
UUP	Alexander Redpath*†	11.63%	671	678	687	687	706	711.28	738.61	805.25	859.58	1,079.58
Alliance	Owen Gawith	8.54%	493	535	554	701	717	717.33	721.33	722.31	904.64	918.64
NI Conservatives	Neil Johnston	6.51%	376	383	392	400	432	432.66	434.66	434.66	475.3	551.47
TUV	Jonny Miller	5.80%	335	338	339	340	418	419.32	432.32	448.98	461.98	
NI21	Roger Duncan	3.57%	206	221	320	347	362	363.32	366.32	368.28		
DUP	Colin Preen	6.01%	347	348	349	349	354	354.33				
UKIP	Rebecca McBride	4.95%	286	290	291	297						
SDLP	Dee French	4.00%	231	237	240							
NI21	Neil McNickle	2.56%	148	158								
Green (NI)	Luke Robinson	2.06%	119									
Electorate: 11,673 Valid: 5,772 (49.45%) Spoilt: 60 Quota: 963 Turnout: 5,832 (49.96%)

=== Killultagh ===
2014: 3 x DUP, 1 x UUP, 1 x SDLP

Killultagh - 5 seats
Party	Candidate	FPv%	Count				
Party	Candidate	FPv%	1	2	3	4	5
DUP	Thomas Beckett*	18.78%	1,216				
UUP	Robbie Butler †	18.22%	1,180				
SDLP	Pat Catney* †††	10.78%	698	700.42	703.12	774.97	1,072.61
DUP	William Leathem	12.49%	809	897.44	936.86	980.51	1,040.93
DUP	James Tinsley*	13.34%	864	896.67	929.7	965.66	1,018.47
Sinn Féin	Mary Quinn	13.19%	854	854.33	854.42	870.51	900.62
Alliance	Jonnie McCrea	7.03%	455	458.96	466.7	654.73	
NI21	David Honeyford	6.16%	399	402.19	414.7		
Electorate: 12,863 Valid: 6,475 (50.34%) Spoilt: 59 Quota: 1,080 Turnout: 6,534 (50.80%)

=== Lisburn North ===
2014: 3 x DUP, 1 x UUP, 1 x Alliance, 1 x NI21

Lisburn North - 6 seats
Party	Candidate	FPv%	Count									
Party	Candidate	FPv%	1	2	3	4	5	6	7	8	9	10
UUP	Brian Bloomfield*	15.51%	1,026									
Alliance	Stephen Martin*	10.75%	711	720	729.28	731.68	755	760.72	968.72			
DUP	Scott Carson*	10.34%	684	685	703.24	749.32	756.56	831.04	833.2	939.04	946.04	
DUP	Margaret Tolerton*	11.11%	735	735	743	779.16	785.24	823.2	828.2	886.6	889.68	889.97
NI21	Johnny McCarthy ‡‡	4.97%	329	340	343.68	348.76	516.64	524.36	587.52	656.56	838.56	859.44
DUP	Jenny Palmer* ‡†	8.07%	534	534	541.36	554.76	556.84	599.12	605.28	670.76	671.76	672.63
DUP	Yvonne Craig*	7.95%	526	527	535.8	554.28	558.36	597.08	598.16	664.04	669.04	669.33
Sinn Féin	Jacqui McGeough	7.45%	493	493	493	493	498	498	627	630.08		
UKIP	Alan Love	5.12%	339	341	345.72	378.12	380.36	500.04	511.12			
SDLP	Nicola Turtle	7.04%	466	469	470.2	470.28	483.28	484.36				
TUV	John McCall	4.53%	300	301	310.44	348.48	353.56					
NI21	Colin McCord	3.58%	237	241	243.16	243.16						
PUP	Matt Brennan	3.07%	203	203	208.44							
Independent	Jonny Orr	0.50%	33									
Electorate: 14,284 Valid: 6,616 (46.32%) Spoilt: 109 Quota: 946 Turnout: 6,725 (47.08%)

=== Lisburn South ===
2014: 4 x DUP, 1 x UUP, 1 x Alliance

Lisburn South - 6 seats
Party	Candidate	FPv%	Count							
Party	Candidate	FPv%	1	2	3	4	5	6	7	8
UUP	Tim Mitchell	14.04%	874	890						
DUP	Alan Givan	13.06%	813	818	831	918				
DUP	Andrew Ewing*	11.18%	696	699	703	764	1,089			
DUP	Paul Porter*	12.33%	768	782	794	882	982			
DUP	Rhoda Walker	9.07%	565	570	578	661	737	924.96		
Alliance	Amanda Grehan	6.91%	430	481	719	727	744	749.92	754.92	765.32
NI21	David Cairns	7.10%	442	553	642	680	695	697.96	710.96	735.4
DUP	Alan Carlisle*	7.93%	494	497	504	561				
TUV	Andrew Moore	7.53%	469	475	480					
SDLP	Conor Quinn	6.79%	423	438						
Green (NI)	James McMurray	2.22%	138							
NI21	Andrew Doran	1.85%	115							
Electorate: 14,566 Valid: 6,227 (42.75%) Spoilt: 94 Quota: 890 Turnout: 6,321 (43.40%)

*Incumbent.

== Changes during the term ==
=== † Co-options ===
Date co-opted	Electoral Area	Party	Outgoing	Co-optee	Reason
2 Jun 2016	Lisburn North	DUP	Jenny Palmer (UUP)	Jonathan Craig	Palmer (UUP, former DUP) was elected to the assembly.
17 Jun 2016	Downshire West	UUP	Alexander Redpath	Nicholas Trimble	Redpath filled the vacancy in Killultagh arising from Butler's election to the assembly.
17 Jun 2016	Killultagh	UUP	Robbie Butler	Alexander Redpath	Redpath filled the vacancy in Killultagh arising from Butler's election to the assembly.
29 Mar 2017	Killultagh	SDLP	Pat Catney	Conor Quinn	Catney was elected to the assembly.
16 Apr 2018	Killultagh	SDLP	Conor Quinn	Christine Robb	
9 Jul 2018	Killultagh	SDLP	Christine Robb	Máiría Cahill	Robb resigned.

=== ‡ Changes in affiliation ===
Date	Electoral Area	Name	Previous affiliation	New affiliation	Circumstance
2 Sep 2015	Downshire West	John Palmer	DUP	UUP	Defected.
2 Sep 2015	Lisburn North	Jenny Palmer	DUP	UUP	Defected.
29 Dec 2015	Lisburn North	Johnny McCarthy	NI21	Independent	Resigned.
23 Feb 2016	Lisburn North	Johnny McCarthy	Independent	SDLP	Affiliated.
25 Jan 2017	Castlereagh South	Vasundhara Kamble	Alliance	Independent	Resigned.
25 Jan 2017	Castlereagh South	Geraldine Rice	Alliance	Independent	Resigned.
6 May 2016	Lisburn North	Vacancy	UUP	DUP	Palmer's vacated seat reverts to DUP.
25 Nov 2017	Castlereagh South	Vasundhara Kamble	Independent	DUP	Affiliated.

Last update 25 March 2019.

Current composition: see Lisburn and Castlereagh.
