= David Honeyford =

Alliance Party of Northern Ireland MLA

David Honeyford MLA
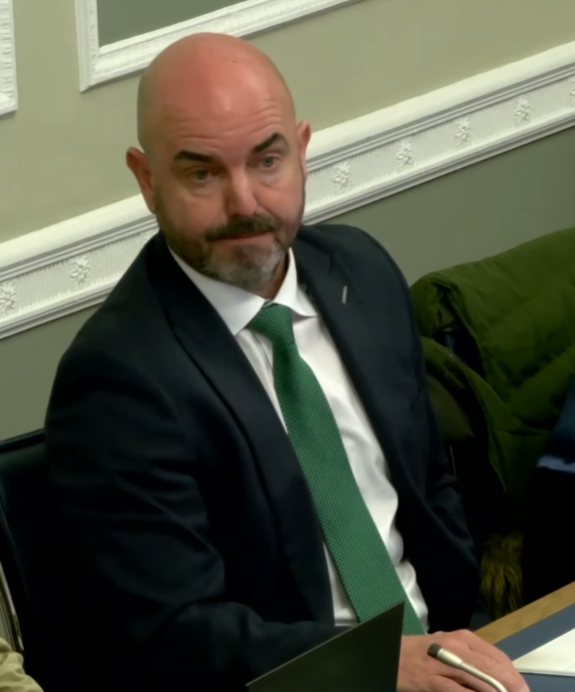
- Honeyford in 2026

Member of the Northern Ireland Assembly for Lagan Valley
- Incumbent
- Assumed office 5 May 2022
- Preceded by: Pat Catney

Member of Lisburn & Castlereagh Council
- In office 7 May 2019 – 5 May 2022
- Preceded by: William Leathem
- Succeeded by: Sian Mulholland
- Constituency: Killutagh

Personal details
- Party: Alliance (since 2014)
- Other political affiliations: NI21 (before 2014)
- Occupation: Politician

David Honeyford is an Alliance Party politician, serving as a Member of the Northern Ireland Assembly (MLA) for Lagan Valley since 2022.

== Political party memberships ==
He joined the Alliance Party in 2014 after a short introduction into politics with NI21, becoming a member of Alliance’s ruling Executive in 2016. He stepped down from that role in February 2017 after making a comment on Twitter, for which he apologised, that unionists were “bred to hate Catholics more than corruption”.

== Political career ==
=== Early career ===
In the May 2014 local elections to Lisburn and Castlereagh City Council, Honeyford was the NI21 candidate for the constituency of Killultagh. With the eve of poll collapse of NI21 Honeyford received 399 votes or 6.16% of First Preference Votes.

=== Councillor (2019-2022) ===
Honeyford was first elected to Lisburn and Castlereagh City Council at the 2019 local elections for the Killultagh constituency. He topped the poll, with 20.3% of first preference votes and gained a seat for Alliance at the expense of the DUP's William Leathem. This was the first time an Alliance candidate had won in the Killultagh constituency

=== Member of the Legislative Assembly (2022-) ===
Honeyford was later elected as an MLA in the 2022 Northern Ireland Assembly election for Lagan Valley, alongside fellow Alliance Party candidate Sorcha Eastwood, after winning 4,183 First Preference Votes. He was elected on the 7th count, taking the constituency's final seat from the SDLP's Pat Catney by a margin of 644 votes - the seventh closest margin in Northern Ireland.

David is the Alliance Party Spokesperson for the Economy, Energy, Trade and Investment and published Alliance’s Economic vision for a Shared Island He also Chairs the Stormont All Party Group for Sport.

== Personal life ==
David Honeyford was educated at Lagan College during the very early years of Integrated Education in Northern Ireland.

Honeyford previously worked in construction and was self-employed for 25 years.

As of January 2025, he is the Development Officer at Glenavy GAC, and was presented with the Club Member of the Year Award in 2018 and is an Irish and Ulster rugby fan.
