= Pat Catney =

Politician from Northern Ireland

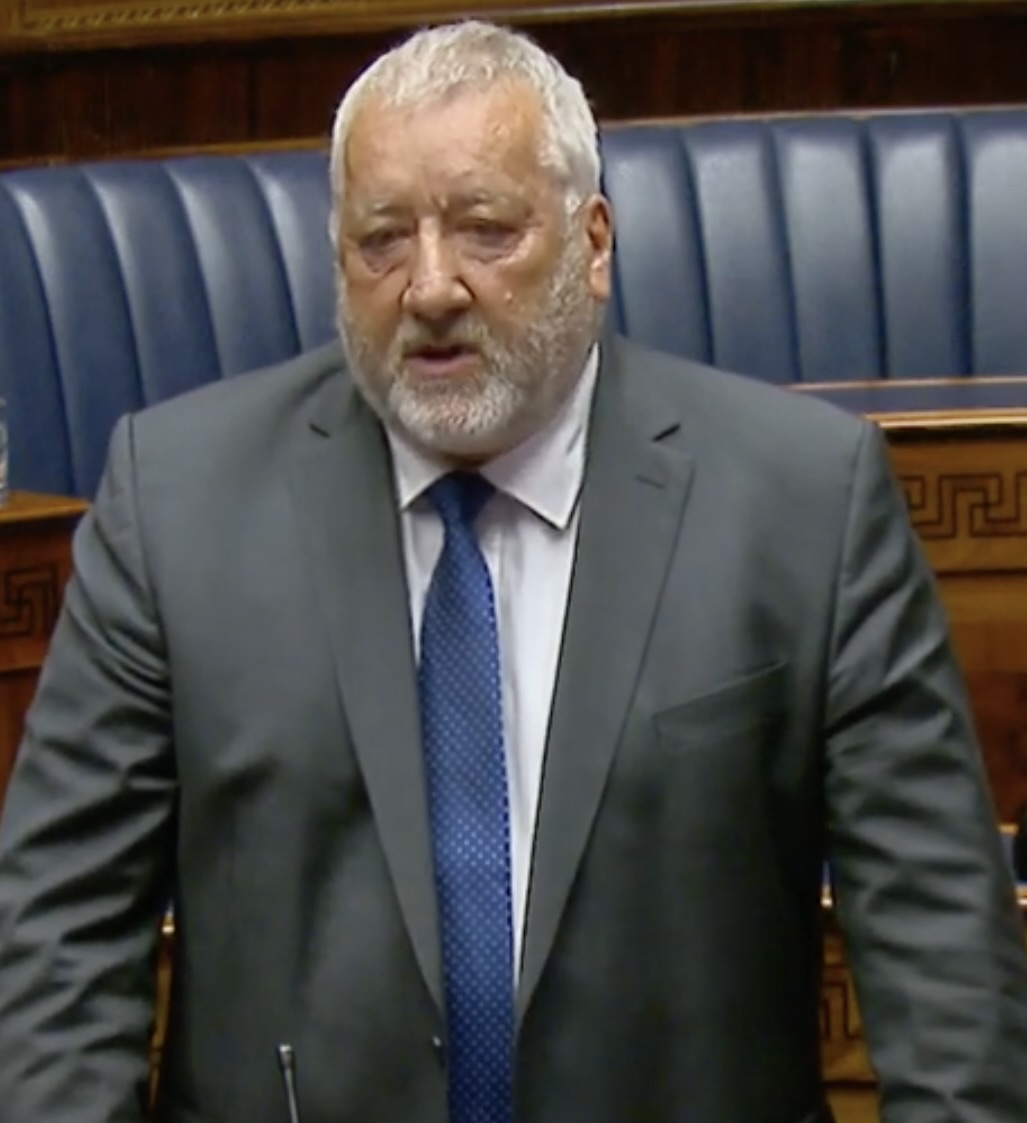
- Catney in 2020

Member of Lisburn and Castlereagh City Council
- Incumbent
- Assumed office 18 May 2023
- Preceded by: Johnny McCarthy
- Constituency: Lisburn North
- In office 22 May 2014 – 2 March 2017
- Preceded by: Council created
- Succeeded by: Conor Quinn
- Constituency: Killultagh

Member of the Northern Ireland Assembly for Lagan Valley
- In office 2 March 2017 – 28 March 2022
- Preceded by: Brenda Hale
- Succeeded by: David Honeyford

Member of Lisburn City Council
- In office 5 May 2011 – 22 May 2014
- Preceded by: Peter O'Hagan
- Succeeded by: Council abolished
- Constituency: Killultagh

Personal details
- Born: 11 November 1954 (age 71)
- Party: SDLP
- Spouse: Rosemary Catney (m. 1982)
- Children: 4
- Occupation: Politician
- Website: website

Pat Catney (born 11 November 1954) is an Irish Social Democratic and Labour Party (SDLP) politician and former publican, serving as a Lisburn and Castlereagh City Councillor for the Lisburn North DEA since 2023. Catney previously served as a Member of the Northern Ireland Assembly (MLA) for Lagan Valley from 2017 to 2022.

== Early life ==
Catney was born in 1954 to Eileen (née McDonald, died in 2020) and James Catney, who ran the Kitchen Bar in Belfast, having previously run the Liverpool Bar on Donegall Quay. Before entering politics, Catney ran the Kitchen Bar, and was involved in the running of the parish centre at St Patrick's Church in Lisburn.

== Political career ==
He was elected to Lisburn City Council in 2011, representing the Killutagh District. He also unsuccessfully contested Lagan Valley in the Assembly election held that same day.

Catney was elected onto the successor Lisburn and Castlereagh City Council in 2014, again representing Killutagh.

He again contested Lagan Valley at the 2016 Assembly election, but was not elected.

He was elected to the Northern Ireland Assembly for Lagan Valley in the 2017 election. He currently serves as the SDLP spokesperson for Small Business and Innovation.

Catney's office was picketed by Britain First supporters in 2018, for which the motive was unclear. Catney responded by saying "Such actions didn't deter me then, and Saturday’s empty protest by this group will not deter me now," adding that "Lisburn is a city for all, Catholic, Protestant and dissenter – any message that undermines the good relations of this great city is not welcome."

In 2020, Catney put forward legislation in the Assembly to make period products available free in all schools, colleges and public buildings, to combat period poverty. The bill was passed into law in March 2022.

He lost his seat to David Honeyford of the Alliance Party at the 2022 Assembly election.

Catney announced he would be standing in the 2023 Northern Ireland local elections and was later confirmed as the SDLP candidate for Lisburn North. At the election on 19 May 2023, Catney was elected on the fourth count.

== Personal life ==
Catney married his wife Rosemary in 1982, and the couple have four children.

Northern Ireland Assembly
Preceded by Brenda Hale	MLA for Lagan Valley; 2017–2022	Succeeded by David Honeyford
