= Downshire West (District Electoral Area) =

District electoral area in Northern Ireland

- Lisburn and Castlereagh City Council DEA constituency

Current constituency
- Created: 2014
- Seats: 5 (2014-)
- Councillors: Allan Ewart (DUP); Owen Gawith (APNI); Alan Martin (UUP); Caleb McCready (DUP); Gretta Thompson (APNI)

Downshire West DEA within Lisburn and Castlereagh

Downshire West is one of the seven district electoral areas (DEA) in Lisburn and Castlereagh, Northern Ireland. The district elects five members to Lisburn and Castlereagh City Council and contains the wards of Blaris, Hillsborough, Lagan, Maze and Moira. Downshire West forms part of the Lagan Valley constituencies for the Northern Ireland Assembly and UK Parliament.

It was created for the 2014 local elections, largely replacing the Downshire DEA which had existed since 1985, as well as gaining Moira from Killultagh DEA and Blaris from Lisburn South DEA.

== Councillors ==
Election	Councillor (Party)	Councillor (Party)	Councillor (Party)	Councillor (Party)	Councillor (Party)
2023	Owen Gawith (Alliance)	Gretta Thompson (Alliance)	Alan Martin (UUP)	Caleb McCready (DUP)	Allan Ewart (DUP)
2019	Owen Gawith (Alliance)	Jim Dillon (UUP)	John Palmer (UUP)/ (DUP)	Caleb McCready (DUP)	Allan Ewart (DUP)
June 2016 Co-Option	Owen Gawith (Alliance)	Jim Dillon (UUP)	John Palmer (UUP)/ (DUP)	Nicholas Trimble (UUP)	Allan Ewart (DUP)
September 2015 Defection	Owen Gawith (Alliance)	Jim Dillon (UUP)	John Palmer (UUP)/ (DUP)	Alexander Redpath (UUP)	Allan Ewart (DUP)
2014	Owen Gawith (Alliance)	Jim Dillon (UUP)	John Palmer (UUP)/ (DUP)	Alexander Redpath (UUP)	Allan Ewart (DUP)

== 2023 Election ==
2019: 2 x DUP, 2 x UUP, 1 x Alliance

2023: 2 x DUP, 2 x Alliance, 1 x UUP

2019–2023 Change: Alliance gain from UUP

Downshire West - 5 seats
Party	Candidate	FPv%	Count					
Party	Candidate	FPv%	1	2	3	4	5	6
Alliance	Owen Gawith*	23.58%	1,693					
Alliance	Gretta Thompson	13.04%	936	1,353.02				
UUP	Alan Martin	8.69%	624	641.98	693.33	776.91	1,315.91	
DUP	Caleb McCready*	13.87%	996	1,014.56	1,020.85	1,032.40	1,059.86	1,093.46
DUP	Allan Ewart*	13.53%	971	975.06	987.35	992.81	1,039.51	1,082.56
DUP	William Leathem	12.79%	918	921.48	925.48	928.21	947.26	988.56
UUP	Liz McCord	8.57%	615	621.38	691.12	739.42		
Sinn Féin	Siobhán Murphy	4.21%	302	310.70				
Green (NI)	Luke Robinson	1.73%	124	135.02				
Electorate: 13,284 Valid: 7,179 (54.04%) Spoilt: 72 Quota: 1,197 Turnout: 7,251 (54.58%)

== 2019 Election ==
2014: 2 x DUP, 2 x UUP, 1 x Alliance

2019: 2 x DUP, 2 x UUP, 1 x Alliance

2014-2019 Change: No change

Downshire West - 5 seats
Party	Candidate	FPv%	Count						
Party	Candidate	FPv%	1	2	3	4	5	6	7
Alliance	Owen Gawith*	25.92%	1,616						
DUP	Caleb McCready	16.23%	1,012	1,029.76	1,060.76				
UUP	John Palmer*	14.68%	915	988.26	1,038.95	1,039.74	1,081.74		
UUP	Jim Dillon*	10.70%	667	722.87	767.97	771.92	842.03	871.03	1,071.06
DUP	Allan Ewart*	10.75%	670	678.51	686.62	693.73	706.58	710.58	715.8
DUP	Vince Curry	10.38%	647	652.92	657.66	663.98	669.09	670.09	682.53
SDLP	Morgan Crone	4.94%	308	458.96	473.62	474.41	664.58	669.58	
Green (NI)	Luke Robinson	3.69%	230	416.11	471.79	473.37			
NI Conservatives	Neil Johnston	2.71%	169	234.86					
Electorate: 12,385 Valid: 6,234 (50.34%) Spoilt: 67 Quota: 1,040 Turnout: 6,301 (50.88%)

== 2014 Election ==
2014: 2 x DUP, 2 x UUP, 1 x Alliance

Downshire West - 5 seats
Party	Candidate	FPv%	Count									
Party	Candidate	FPv%	1	2	3	4	5	6	7	8	9	10
UUP	Jim Dillon*	15.80%	912	914	921	936	975					
DUP	Allan Ewart*	15.25%	880	883	883	886	914	915.32	1,049.32			
DUP	John Palmer* ‡	13.31%	768	771	773	775	808	809.32	972.32			
UUP	Alexander Redpath*†	11.63%	671	678	687	687	706	711.28	738.61	805.25	859.58	1,079.58
Alliance	Owen Gawith	8.54%	493	535	554	701	717	717.33	721.33	722.31	904.64	918.64
NI Conservatives	Neil Johnston	6.51%	376	383	392	400	432	432.66	434.66	434.66	475.3	551.47
TUV	Jonny Miller	5.80%	335	338	339	340	418	419.32	432.32	448.98	461.98	
NI21	Roger Duncan	3.57%	206	221	320	347	362	363.32	366.32	368.28		
DUP	Colin Preen	6.01%	347	348	349	349	354	354.33				
UKIP	Rebecca McBride	4.95%	286	290	291	297						
SDLP	Dee French	4.00%	231	237	240							
NI21	Neil McNickle	2.56%	148	158								
Green (NI)	Luke Robinson	2.06%	119									
Electorate: 11,673 Valid: 5,772 (49.45%) Spoilt: 60 Quota: 963 Turnout: 5,832 (49.96%)
