= Downshire East (District Electoral Area) =

District electoral area in Northern Ireland

- Lisburn and Castlereagh City Council DEA constituency

Current constituency
- Created: 2014
- Seats: 5 (2014-)
- Councillors: James Baird (UUP); Kurtis Dickson (APNI); Andrew Gowan (DUP); Uel Mackin (DUP); Aaron McIntyre (APNI)

Downshire East DEA within Lisburn and Castlereagh

Downshire East is one of the seven district electoral areas (DEA) in Lisburn and Castlereagh, Northern Ireland. The district elects five members to Lisburn and Castlereagh City Council and contains the wards of Ballymacbrennan, Dromara, Drumbo, Hillhall and Ravernet. Downshire East forms part of the Lagan Valley constituencies for the Northern Ireland Assembly and UK Parliament.

It was created for the 2014 local elections, largely replacing the Downshire DEA which had existed since 1985.

== Councillors ==
Election	Councillor (Party)	Councillor (Party)	Councillor (Party)	Councillor (Party)	Councillor (Party)
2023	Aaron McIntyre (Alliance)	Kurtis Dickson (Alliance)	James Baird (UUP)	Andrew Gowan (DUP)	Uel Mackin (DUP)
2019	Aaron McIntyre (Alliance)	Alex Swan (UUP)	James Baird (UUP)	Andrew Gowan (DUP)	Uel Mackin (DUP)
2014	Aaron McIntyre (Alliance)	Luke Poots (DUP)	James Baird (UUP)	Janet Gray (DUP)	Uel Mackin (DUP)

== 2023 Election ==
2019: 2 x DUP, 2 x UUP, 1 x Alliance

2023: 2 x DUP, 2 x Alliance, 1 x UUP

2019–2023 Change: Alliance gain from UUP

Downshire East - 5 seats
Party	Candidate	FPv%	Count					
Party	Candidate	FPv%	1	2	3	4	5	6
DUP	Andrew Gowan*	26.01%	1,798					
DUP	Uel Mackin*	15.33%	1,060	1,576.96				
Alliance	Aaron McIntyre*	15.94%	1,102	1,123.96	1,139.00	1,253.00		
Alliance	Kurtis Dickson	14.12%	976	981.04	985.84	1,147.84		
UUP	James Baird*	10.50%	726	768.48	938.40	945.76	959.76	1,154.76
UUP	Alex Swan*	6.97%	482	498.92	600.36	605.36	626.36	749.36
TUV	Stewart Ferris	5.73%	396	428.76	564.12	566.48	570.48	
SDLP	John Drake	4.51%	312	314.52	317.08			
Electorate: 12,763 Valid: 6,852 (54.17%) Spoilt: 62 Quota: 1,143 Turnout: 6,976 (54.66%)

== 2019 Election ==
2014: 3 x DUP, 1 x UUP, 1 x Alliance

2019: 2 x DUP, 2 x UUP, 1 x Alliance

2014-2019 Change: UUP gain from DUP

Downshire East - 5 seats
Party	Candidate	FPv%	Count		
Party	Candidate	FPv%	1	2	3
Alliance	Aaron McIntyre*	21.34%	1,318		
DUP	Andrew Gowan	18.35%	1,133		
UUP	James Baird*	15.38%	950	1,003.75	1,081.75
UUP	Alex Swan	11.76%	726	787.5	930.5
DUP	Uel Mackin*	14.66%	905	911.25	920.75
DUP	Janet Gray*	11.68%	721	731.5	741.5
SDLP	Owen Beckett	6.83%	422	574.5	
Electorate: 12,214 Valid: 6,175 (50.56%) Spoilt: 47 Quota: 1,030 Turnout: 6,222 (50.94%)

== 2014 Election ==
2014: 3 x DUP, 1 x UUP, 1 x Alliance

Downshire East - 5 seats
Party	Candidate	FPv%	Count									
Party	Candidate	FPv%	1	2	3	4	5	6	7	8	9	10
DUP	Luke Poots*	20.78%	1,245									
DUP	Uel Mackin*	12.25%	734	778.4	798.2	806.8	1,058.8					
UUP	James Baird*	12.25%	734	748.6	787.8	799	825.4	829	1,156			
DUP	Janet Gray	8.01%	480	594	611.4	617	709.2	757.92	824.84	1,074.84		
Alliance	Aaron McIntyre	11.54%	691	693.8	711.8	747.2	753.4	753.88	779.28	804.88	866.88	880.88
NI21	Christina Dobson	7.11%	426	430.8	450	646.2	654.4	654.88	673.92	722.48	810.48	860.48
TUV	Tom Mateer	6.89%	413	418.8	467.2	470.4	484	485.92	517.24			
UUP	Alex Swan	7.21%	432	442.8	451.2	462.4	483.2	485.36				
DUP	Roy Young*	6.19%	371	412.6	427.2	427.8						
NI21	Glenn Wilson	4.52%	271	274.2	279.2							
UKIP	Peter Lindsay	3.32%	199	202								
Electorate: 11,563 Valid: 5,990 (51.80%) Spoilt: 72 Quota: 1,000 Turnout: 6,062 (52.43%)
