= Lisburn and Castlereagh =

Local government district in Northern Ireland

- District, city and borough
- Coat of arms
- Motto(s): Latin: Ex Igne Resurgam, lit. 'I will arise out of fire'
- Lisburn and Castlereagh shown within Northern Ireland
- Coordinates: 54.523°N 5.973°W
- Sovereign state: United Kingdom
- Country: Northern Ireland
- Incorporated: 1 April 2015
- Named for: City of Lisburn and Borough of Castlereagh
- Administrative HQ: Lagan Valley Island

Government
  - Type: District council
  - Body: Lisburn and Castlereagh City Council
  - Executive: Committee system
  - Control: No overall control

Area
  - Total: 195 sq mi (504 km^{2})
  - Rank: 9th

Population (2025)
  - Total: 152,367
  - Rank: 6th
  - Density: 780/sq mi (303/km^{2})
- Time zone: UTC+0 (GMT)
  - Summer (DST): UTC+1 (BST)
- Postcode areas: BT
- Dialling codes: 028
- ISO 3166 code: GB-LBC
- GSS code: N09000007
- Website: lisburncastlereagh.gov.uk

Lisburn and Castlereagh is a local government district in Northern Ireland. The district was created on 1 April 2015. It consists of the combined area of the City of Lisburn with the Borough of Castlereagh, but not including "the localities of Gilnahirk, Tullycarnet, Braniel, Castlereagh, Merok, Cregagh, Wynchurch, Glencregagh and Belvoir, Collin Glen, Poleglass, Lagmore, Twinbrook, Kilwee and Dunmurry" which transferred to Belfast. The local authority is officially known as the Lisburn & Castlereagh City Council, or abbreviated to LCCC.

== Geography ==
The district takes in many of the outer suburbs of Belfast and had an electorate of 83,369 prior to its formation. The name of the new district was recommended on 17 September 2008. The area covered by the new Council had an estimated population of 152,367 residents in 2025.

== Lisburn and Castlereagh City Council ==
Lisburn and Castlereagh City Council

Type
- Type: City council of Lisburn and Castlereagh

History
- Founded: 1 April 2015
- Preceded by: Castlereagh Borough Council; Lisburn City Council

Leadership
- Mayor: Brian Higginson, Democratic Unionist Party
- Deputy Mayor: Aaron McIntyre, Alliance Party of Northern Ireland

Structure
- Seats: 40
- Graph of the party split among 40 seats.
- Political groups: All parties (40) DUP (14) Alliance (13) UUP (6) Sinn Féin (4) SDLP (2) Independent (1)
- Length of term: 4 years

Elections
- Voting system: Single transferable vote
- Last election: 18 May 2023
- Next election: 6 May 2027

Meeting place
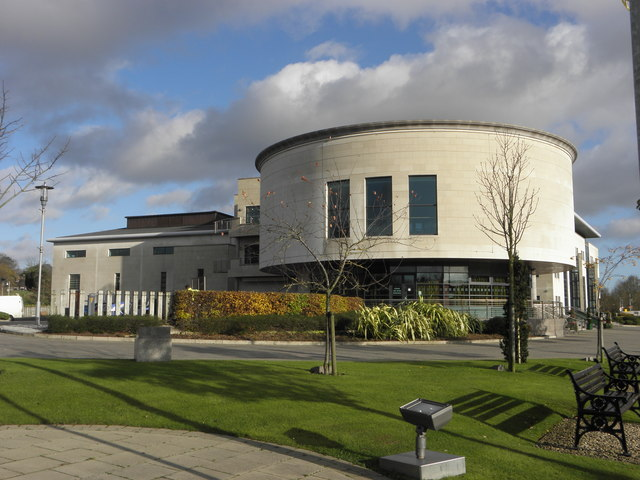
- Civic Headquarters, Lagan Valley Island, Lisburn, BT27 4RL

Website
- http://lisburncastlereagh.gov.uk/

Lisburn and Castlereagh City Council replaces Lisburn City Council and Castlereagh Borough Council. The first election for the new district council was originally due to take place in May 2009, but on 25 April 2008, Shaun Woodward, Secretary of State for Northern Ireland announced that the scheduled 2009 district council elections were to be postponed until 2011. The first elections took place on 22 May 2014 and the council acted as a shadow authority until 1 April 2015, at which date the council proper was created. In 2025, Lisburn and Castlereigh had their first female mayor appointed with the Alliance Party's Amanda Grehan appointed and the Ulster Unionist Party's Hazel Legge becoming deputy mayor, resulting in the district's first all female mayoral team.

=== Mayor ===
From	To	Name	Party
2015	2016	Thomas Beckett	DUP
2016	2017	Brian Bloomfield	UUP
2017	2018	Tim Morrow	Alliance
2018	2019	Uel Mackin	DUP
2019	2020	Alan Givan	DUP
2020	2021	Nicholas Trimble	UUP
2021	2022	Stephen Martin	Alliance
2022	2023	Scott Carson	DUP
2023	2024	Andrew Gowan	DUP
2024	2025	Kurtis Dickson	Alliance
2025	2026	Amanda Grehan	Alliance
2026	2027	Brian Higginson	DUP

=== Deputy Mayor ===
From	To	Name	Party
2015	2016	Alexander Redpath	UUP
2016	2017	Stephen Martin	Alliance
2017	2018	Hazel Legge	UUP
2018	2019	Amanda Grehan	Alliance
2019	2020	Johnny McCarthy	SDLP
2020	2021	Jenny Palmer	UUP
2021	2022	Tim Mitchell	UUP
2022	2023	Michelle Guy	Alliance
2023	2024	Gary McCleave	Sinn Féin
2024	2025	Ryan Carlin	Sinn Féin
2025	2026	Hazel Legge	UUP
2026	2027	Aaron McIntyre	Alliance

== Councillors ==
For the purpose of elections the council is divided into seven district electoral areas (DEA):

Area	Seats
Castlereagh East	6
Castlereagh South	7
Downshire East	5
Downshire West	5
Killultagh	5
Lisburn North	6
Lisburn South	6

=== Seat summary ===
Party	Elected 2014	Elected 2019	Elected 2023
DUP	20	15	14
UUP	8	11	6
Alliance	7	9	13
SDLP	3	2	2
Sinn Féin	0	2	4
Green (NI)	0	1	0
TUV	1	0	0
NI21	1	0	0
Independent	0	0	1

=== Councillors by electoral area ===
Borders of the DEAs within Lisburn and Castlereagh

Current council members
District electoral area	Name	Party
Castlereagh East	Sharon Skillen	DUP
Castlereagh East	Martin Gregg	Alliance
Castlereagh East	Samantha Burns	DUP
Castlereagh East	Sharon Lowry	Alliance
Castlereagh East	John Laverty	DUP
Castlereagh East	Hazel Legge	UUP
Castlereagh South	Jamie Harpur †	Alliance
Castlereagh South	Brian Higginson	DUP
Castlereagh South	Bronagh Magee †	Alliance
Castlereagh South	John Gallen	SDLP
Castlereagh South	Ryan Carlin	Sinn Féin
Castlereagh South	Martin McKeever	Alliance
Castlereagh South	Daniel Bassett	Sinn Féin
Downshire East	Andrew Gowan	DUP
Downshire East	Uel Mackin	DUP
Downshire East	Aaron McIntyre	Alliance
Downshire East	Kurtis Dickson	Alliance
Downshire East	James Baird	UUP
Downshire West	Owen Gawith	Alliance
Downshire West	Gretta Thompson	Alliance
Downshire West	Alan Martin	UUP
Downshire West	Allan Ewart	DUP
Downshire West	Caleb McCready	DUP
Killultagh	Gary McCleave	Sinn Féin
Killultagh	Claire Kemp	Alliance
Killultagh	Thomas Beckett	DUP
Killultagh	James Tinsley	DUP
Killultagh	Ross McLernon	UUP
Lisburn North	Declan Lynch †	Sinn Féin
Lisburn North	Jonathan Craig	DUP
Lisburn North	Nicola Parker	Alliance
Lisburn North	Pat Catney	SDLP
Lisburn North	Nicholas Trimble	UUP
Lisburn North	Gary Hynds	Independent
Lisburn South	Andrew Ewing	DUP
Lisburn South	Amanda Grehan	Alliance
Lisburn South	Alan Givan	DUP
Lisburn South	Jessica Bamford †	Alliance
Lisburn South	Tim Mitchell	UUP
Lisburn South	Paul Porter	DUP

== Premises ==
The council is based at the Civic Headquarters at Lagan Valley Island in Lisburn. The building was formerly the headquarters of Lisburn City Council and was completed in 2001.

== See also ==
- Local government in Northern Ireland
- 2014 Northern Ireland local elections
- Political make-up of local councils in the United Kingdom
