= Corruption in Northern Ireland =

Corruption is defined by Transparency International as "the abuse of entrusted power for private gain." Northern Ireland has been home to several large-scale political corruption scandals since 2010, including the Iris Robinson scandal, the Red Sky scandal, and the Renewable Heat Incentive scandal. For most of the time since the Good Friday Agreement was enacted in 1998, (Note: Devolvement was suspended briefly in early 2000 and from 2002 to 2007, at which point the St Andrews Agreement restored devolvement. In these non-devolved periods, there was a return to direct rule.) Northern Ireland's government has been devolved from that of the United Kingdom, allowing for more region-specific politics through the Northern Ireland Assembly and Northern Ireland Executive.

== Politics of Northern Ireland ==
Northern Ireland is a part of the United Kingdom that operates under a devolved governmental structure. This was brought about in 1998 as part of the Good Friday Agreement and has mostly continued in this fashion until present day. This devolution allows for significant self-governance through the Northern Ireland Assembly and Northern Ireland Executive, which creates the possibility of region-specific political corruption. The Assembly is the primary forum for devolved legislation and is composed of 90 individuals. The Executive is headed by the First Minister and deputy First Minister, a diumvirate who oversee the government.

== Scandals ==
The 2008 Iris Robinson scandal involved the misconduct of Iris Robinson, a member of the Castlereagh borough council and Northern Ireland Assembly, who procured a total of £50,000 in loans for Kirk McCambley, a Belfast restaurateur with whom she was having an extramarital affair. She had received the money on uncertain terms from two property developers, one of whom was involved in a prospective development for which Robinson was lobbying. When McCambley applied to the Castlereagh borough council for a property lease to open his café, he was deemed the only qualified candidate for the property and awarded the lease. Robinson, who was present at the meeting at which the lease was decided, did not disclose a conflict of interest in the matter. Robinson was expelled from the Democratic Unionist Party (DUP) as a result, and her husband, Peter Robinson, stepped down from his role as First Minister of the country for six weeks.

The Red Sky scandal spanned from 2007 to 2011 and revolved around Red Sky, a company contracting with the Northern Ireland Housing Executive for maintenance. It was alleged in October 2010 that the company had been performing unsatisfactory work in west Belfast since 2007, and in April 2011 the £8 million contract the company had with the Housing Executive was set to be cancelled in 3 months. In June, Nelson McCausland, the newly instated Minister of Social Development, requested that the contract not be cancelled, instead asking the Housing Executive to extend Red Sky's contract. He was questioned by various individuals including Alex Maskey, chairman of the Social Development Committee, as to why he was intervening in the dispute, but denied any connection with individuals within Red Sky. Red Sky's contract with the Housing Executive ultimately expired due to the original three-month deadline on 14 July.

The Renewable Heat Incentive scandal, also called the "cash-for-ash" scandal, lasted from 2012 to 2017. The scandal involved the Northern Ireland's "renewable heat initiative", designed to reduce the region's reliance on fossil fuels in order to reduce its carbon footprint. This was accomplished by providing a subsidy to those who installed renewable energy sources like wood boilers. However, the amount paid out by the subsidy was more than the cost of wood pellets used to run the boilers, leaving those who used the boilers with a profit. This led to individuals buying multiple boilers and running them nonstop, as the subsidy scaled with the number of renewable energy sources one was operating. Some individuals with close relations to politicians took advantage of this, including three relatives of a DUP special advisor who had 11 boilers between them. This continued until 2016, when the UK Treasury stated that Northern Ireland would be responsible for paying cost overruns related to the program. The program's overall cost is estimated at anywhere from £60m to £800m. The scandal led to the resignation of Martin McGuinness from the post of deputy First Minister, and program auditors reported that they had suspended payments on more than half of the boilers they had inspected.
