= Jenny Palmer =

Northern Irish politician

Jennifer Palmer
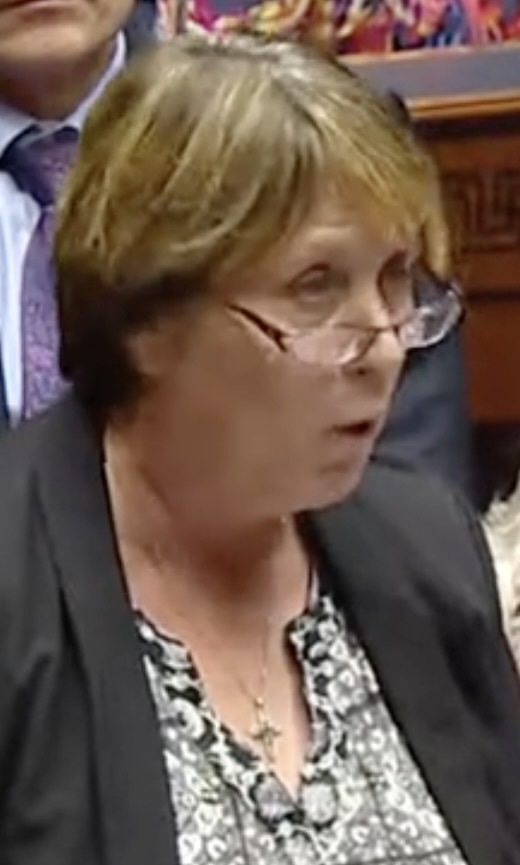
- Palmer in 2016

Member of Lisburn City and Castlereagh District Council
- In office 2 May 2019 – 18 May 2023
- Preceded by: Rhoda Walker
- Succeeded by: Peter Kennedy
- Constituency: Lisburn South
- In office 22 May 2014 – 5 May 2016
- Preceded by: Council created
- Succeeded by: Jonathan Craig
- Constituency: Lisburn North

Member of the Northern Ireland Assembly for Lagan Valley
- In office 5 May 2016 – 26 January 2017
- Preceded by: Jonathan Craig

Member of Lisburn City Council
- In office 5 May 2005 – 22 May 2014
- Preceded by: Thomas Archer
- Succeeded by: Council abolished
- Constituency: Lisburn Town South

Personal details
- Born: May 1, 1959 (age 67) Lisburn, Northern Ireland
- Party: UUP (2015 - present)
- Other political affiliations: DUP (Until 2015)
- Spouse: John
- Children: 3
- Education: Forthill Girls High
- Profession: Politician

Jennifer 'Jenny' Palmer (born 1 May 1959) is an Ulster Unionist Party (UUP) politician who served as a Lisburn and Castlereagh Councillor for the Lisburn South DEA from 2019 to 2023.

Palmer was a Member of the Northern Ireland Assembly (MLA) for Lagan Valley from 2016 to 2017.

Formerly a member of the Democratic Unionist Party (DUP), Palmer left the party in 2015, during the Red Sky scandal.

== Career ==
As a DUP politician, Palmer was first elected to Lisburn City Council in 2005, representing the Lisburn Town South District, and was later re-elected in 2011.

At the 2014 local elections, she was elected onto the successor Lisburn and Castlereagh City Council as one of three DUP representatives for the Lisburn North District.

Following the Red Sky scandal, Palmer resigned from the DUP in 2015, and joined the Ulster Unionist Party.

At the 2016 Northern Ireland Assembly election, she was elected to represent Lagan Valley as one of two UUP members. Palmer lost her seat to Pat Catney of the Social Democratic and Labour Party (SDLP) at the 2017 Assembly election.

She returned to Lisburn and Castlereagh City Council in the 2019 local elections, this time for the Lisburn South DEA. Palmer was defeated at the 2023 local elections, losing her seat to Peter Kennedy of the Alliance Party.

Northern Ireland Assembly
Preceded by Jonathan Craig	MLA for Lagan Valley; 2016–2017	Seat abolished
