= 2017 Northern Ireland Assembly election =

- 2 March 2017

All 90 seats to the Northern Ireland Assembly (Note: The last election was for an Assembly with 108 seats.)
- Opinion polls
- Registered: 1,254,709
- Turnout: 64.78% (▲9.8%)
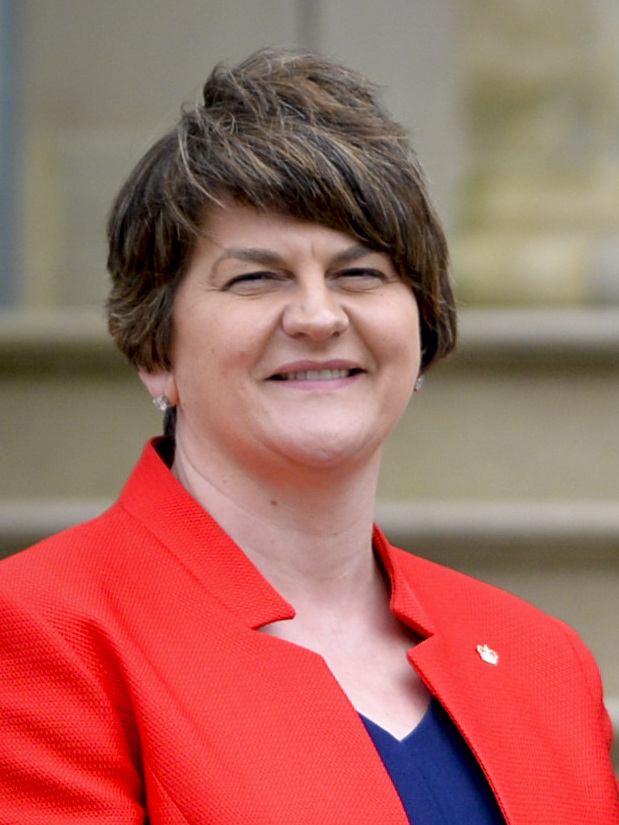

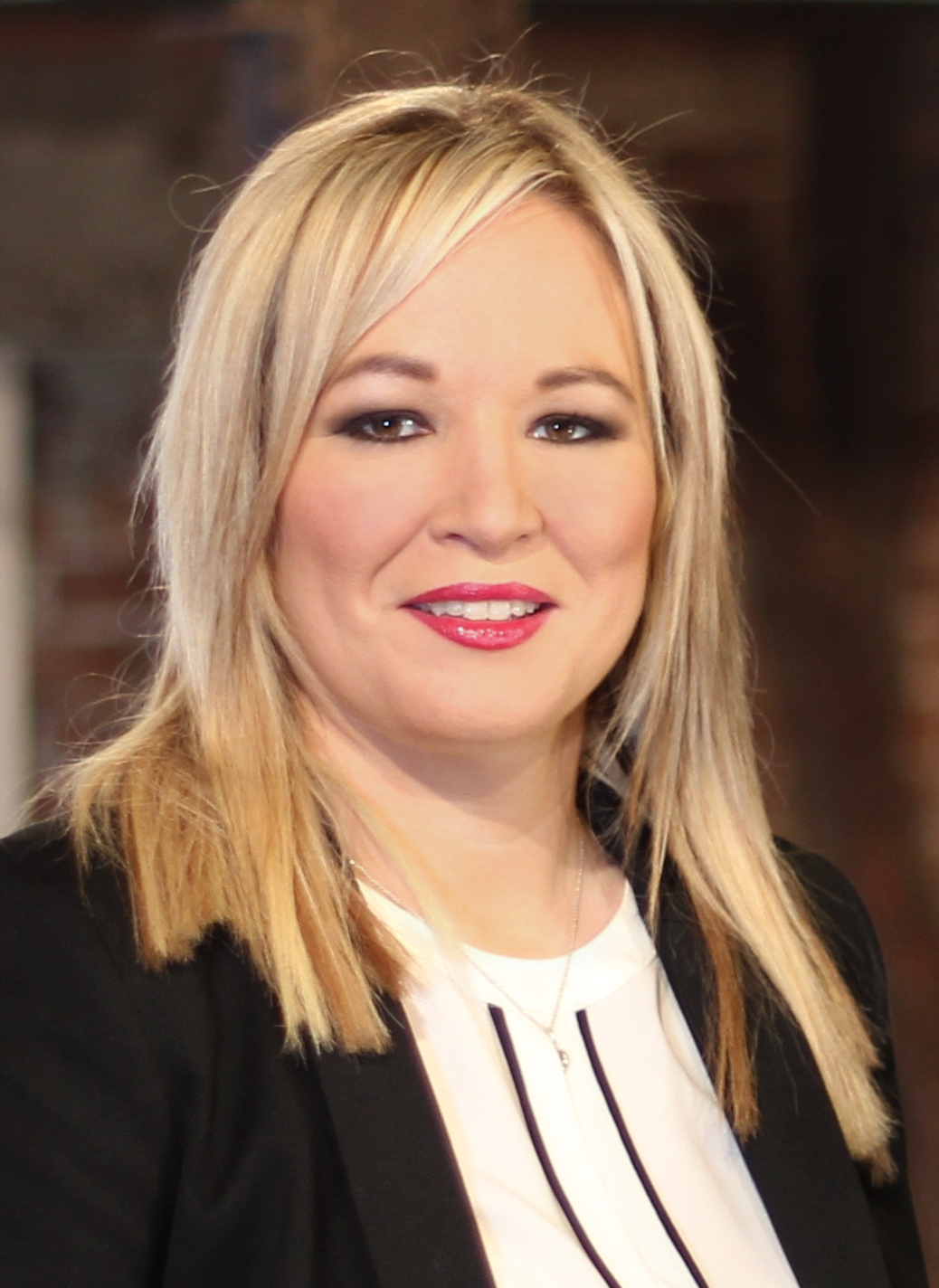

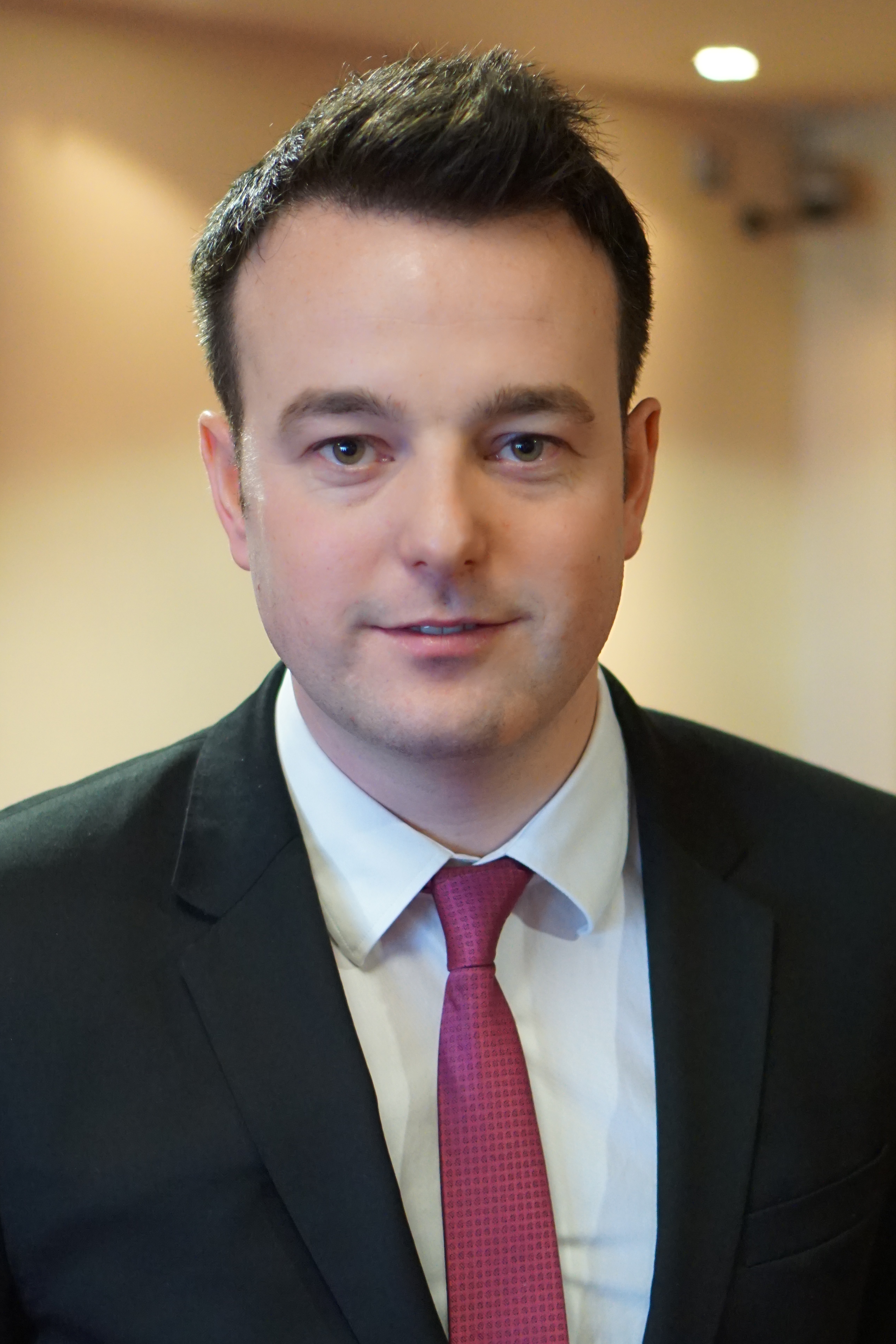

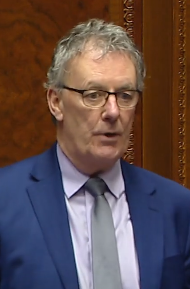

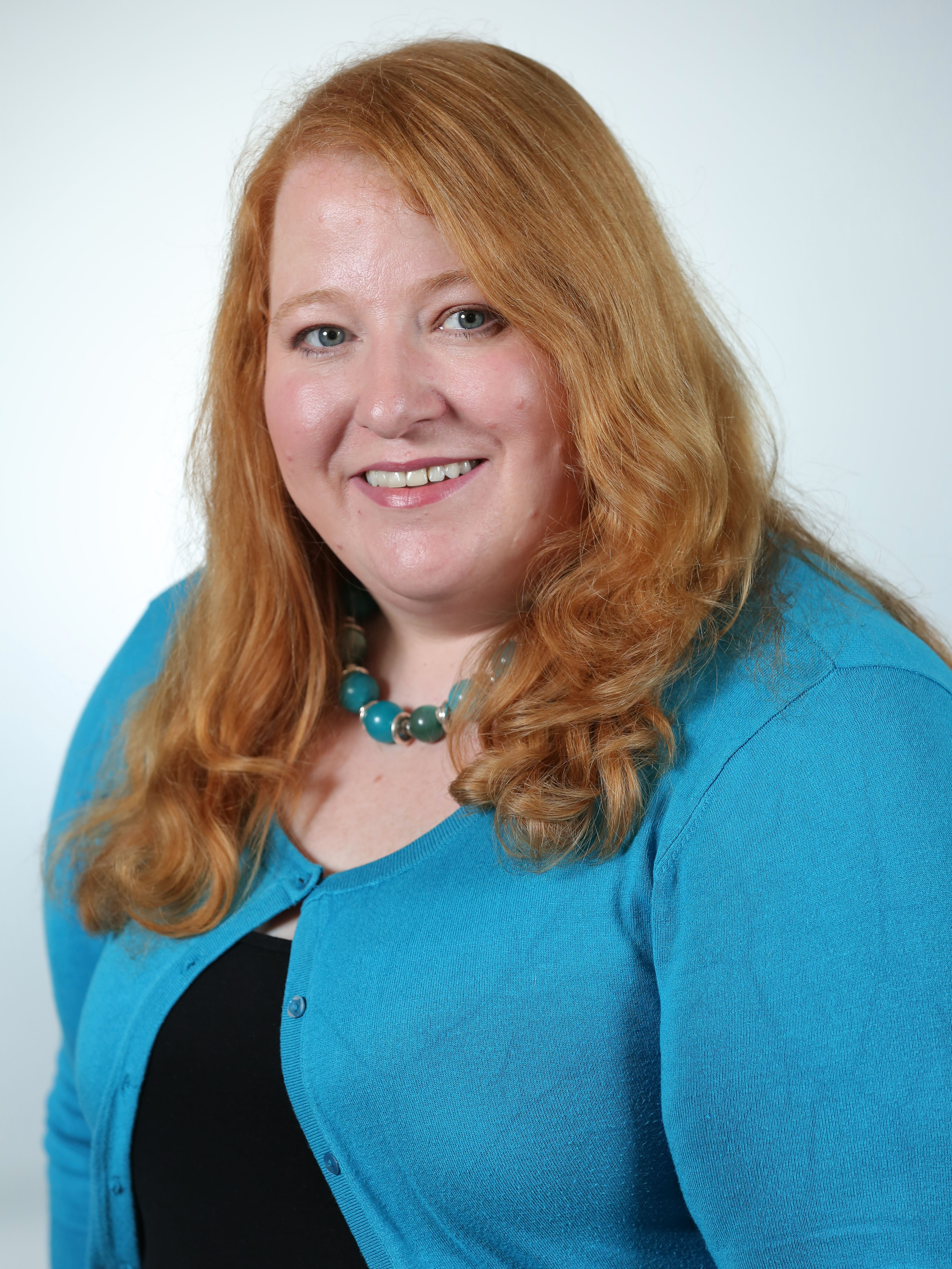

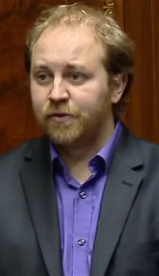

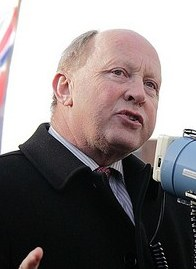

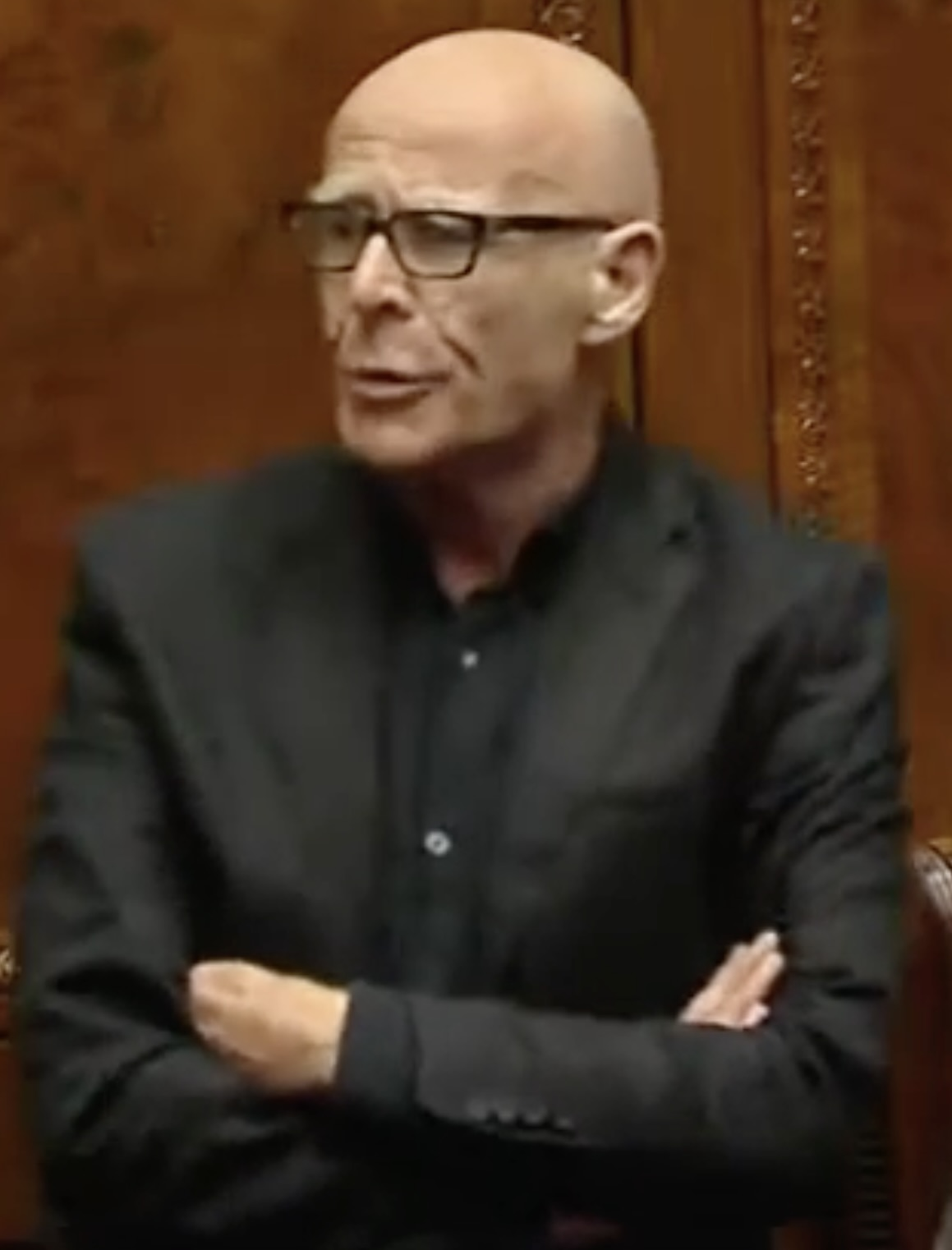
	First party	Second party	Third party
Leader	Arlene Foster	Michelle O'Neill	Colum Eastwood
Party	DUP	Sinn Féin	SDLP
Leader since	17 December 2015	23 January 2017 (Note: "Party leader in the North".)	14 November 2015
Leader's seat	Fermanagh and South Tyrone	Mid Ulster	Foyle
Last election	38 seats, 29.2%	28 seats, 24%	12 seats, 12%
Seats before	38	28	12
Seats won	28	27	12
Seat change	▼10	▼1	Steady
Popular vote	225,413	224,245	95,958
Percentage	28.1%	27.9%	11.9%
Swing	▼1.1%	▲3.9%	▼0.1%
	Fourth party	Fifth party	Sixth party
Leader	Mike Nesbitt	Naomi Long	Steven Agnew
Party	UUP	Alliance	Green (NI)
Leader since	31 March 2012	26 October 2016	January 2011
Leader's seat	Strangford	Belfast East	North Down
Last election	16 seats, 12.6%	8 seats, 7.7%	2 seats, 2.7%
Seats before	16	8	2
Seats won	10	8	2
Seat change	▼6	Steady	Steady
Popular vote	103,314	72,717	18,527
Percentage	12.9%	9.1%	2.3%
Swing	▲0.3%	▲2.1%	▼0.4%
	Seventh party	Eighth party
Leader	Jim Allister	Eamonn McCann
Party	TUV	People Before Profit
Leader since	7 December 2007	N/A
Leader's seat	North Antrim	Foyle (lost seat)
Last election	1 seat, 3.4%	2 seats, 2.0%
Seats before	1	2
Seats won	1	1
Seat change	Steady	▼1
Popular vote	20,523	14,100
Percentage	2.6%	1.8%
Swing	▼0.8%	▼0.2%
- Election results. Voters elect 5 assembly members from the 18 constituencies.
First Minister and
deputy First Minister before election
Arlene Foster (DUP) &
Martin McGuinness (SF)
First Minister and
deputy First Minister after election
Arlene Foster (DUP) &
Michelle O'Neill (SF)

The 2017 Northern Ireland Assembly election was held on Thursday, 2 March 2017. The election was held to elect members (MLAs) following the resignation of deputy First Minister Martin McGuinness in protest over the Renewable Heat Incentive scandal. McGuinness' position was not filled, and thus by law his resignation triggered an election.

Eight parties elected MLAs in the sixth assembly: the Democratic Unionist Party (DUP), Sinn Féin, the Ulster Unionist Party (UUP), the Social Democratic and Labour Party (SDLP), the Alliance Party of Northern Ireland, the Greens, People Before Profit (PBP), and Traditional Unionist Voice (TUV). There was also one Independent Unionist MLA.

It was the sixth election since the Assembly was re-established in 1998, and the first to implement a reduction in size to 90 MLAs (versus the previous 108).

1,254,709 people were registered to vote in the election (26,886 fewer, or a 2.1% decrease, compared to the 2016 Assembly election). 64.78% of registered voters turned out to vote in the 2017 Assembly election, up 9.8 percentage points from the previous Assembly election held in 2016, but 5 percentage points less than in the first election to the Assembly held in 1998.

== Background ==
Theresa Villiers, Secretary of State for Northern Ireland, announced in 2013 that the next Assembly election would be postponed to May 2016, and would be held at fixed intervals of five years thereafter. Section 7 of the Northern Ireland (Miscellaneous Provisions) Act 2014 specifies that elections will be held on the first Thursday in May in the fifth calendar year following that in which its predecessor was elected, which after 2016 was to be 6 May 2021. However, by virtue of section 31(1) of the Northern Ireland Act 1998, there are several circumstances in which the Assembly can be dissolved before the date scheduled.

Martin McGuinness (Sinn Féin), the deputy First Minister, resigned on 9 January 2017 in protest at the Renewable Heat Incentive scandal (RHI) and other issues, such as the DUP's failure to support funding for inquests into killings during The Troubles and for an Irish language project. The First Minister, Arlene Foster (DUP), had been in charge of the RHI scheme in her previous ministerial position, but had refused to temporarily stand down as First Minister while an enquiry took place. Under the power-sharing arrangement, McGuinness' resignation as deputy First Minister meant that Foster automatically lost office as First Minister. The DUP condemned his resignation.

Sinn Féin had seven days, until 5 pm on 16 January 2017, in which to nominate a new deputy First Minister, but refused to do so in the Assembly plenary on 16 January. As a result, the Secretary of State for Northern Ireland, James Brokenshire, confirmed the same day that a snap election would be held on 2 March.

McGuinness subsequently announced that, owing to ill-health, he would not be seeking re-election to the Assembly; he then stepped down from leading the Sinn Féin group. He was replaced by Michelle O'Neill as leader of Sinn Féin in the Northern Ireland Assembly. Nineteen days after the election, McGuinness died.

== Candidates ==
Nominations opened on 27 January 2017 for the assembly election and closed on 8 February 2017.

A total of 228 candidates contested the 90 available seats in the Assembly, a reduction from the 276 who contested the 108 seats available in 2016. The seats were spread over 18 districts, with each district having five seats. The election was conducted using the single transferable vote system.

The table below lists all of the nominated candidates. Candidates for the same party in a constituency are listed in alphabetical order, which is the order they appeared on the ballot paper.

- * indicates an incumbent MLA
- ** indicates the candidate was the incumbent MLA for a different constituency
- ^ indicates a former MLA who was not a member at the dissolution of the 2016–17 Assembly
- Leaders of parties represented in the assembly at dissolution are shown in **bold text**.

Constituency	DUP	SF	SDLP	UUP	Alliance	TUV	Green	Con	Others
Belfast East	Joanne Bunting*; David Douglas; Robin Newton*	Mairéad O'Donnell	Séamas de Faoite	Andy Allen*	**Naomi Long***; Chris Lyttle*	Andrew Girvin	Georgina Milne	Sheila Bodel	John Kyle (PUP); Jordy McKeag (Ind.); Courtney Robinson (CCLA)
Belfast North	Paula Bradley*; William Humphrey*; Nelson McCausland*	Gerry Kelly*; Carál Ní Chuilín*	Nichola Mallon*	Robert Foster	Nuala McAllister		Malachai O'Hara		Julie-Anne Corr-Johnston (PUP); Fiona Ferguson (PBP); Adam Millar (Ind.); Gemma Weir (WP)
Belfast South	Emma Pengelly*; Christopher Stalford*	Máirtín Ó Muilleoir*	Naomh Gallagher; Claire Hanna*	Michael Henderson	Paula Bradshaw*; Emmet McDonough-Brown	John Hiddleston	Clare Bailey*	George Jabbour	Seán Burns (CCLA); Lily Kerr (WP); Pádraigín Mervyn (PBP)
Belfast West	Frank McCoubrey	Órlaithí Flynn*; Alex Maskey*; Fra McCann*; Pat Sheehan*	Alex Attwood*	Fred Rogers	Sorcha Eastwood		Ellen Murray		Conor Campbell (WP); Gerry Carroll* (PBP); Michael Collins (PBP)
East Antrim	David Hilditch*; Gordon Lyons*; Stephen Ross	Oliver McMullan*	Margaret Anne McKillop	Roy Beggs, Jr.*; John Stewart	Stewart Dickson*; Danny Donnelly	Ruth Wilson	Dawn Patterson	Alan Dunlop	Ricky Best (Ind.); Noel Jordan (UKIP); Conor Sheridan (CCLA)
East Londonderry	Maurice Bradley*; Adrian McQuillan*; George Robinson*	Caoimhe Archibald*; Cathal Ó hOisín^	John Dallat^	William McCandless	Chris McCaw	Jordan Armstrong	Anthony Flynn	David Harding	Gavin Campbell (PBP); Gerry Mullan* (Ind.); Claire Sugden* (Ind.); Russell Watton (PUP)
Fermanagh and South Tyrone	**Arlene Foster***; Maurice Morrow*	Jemma Dolan; Michelle Gildernew*; Seán Lynch*	Richie McPhillips*	Rosemary Barton*	Noreen Campbell	Alex Elliott	Tanya Jones	Richard Dunn	Donal Ó Cófaigh (CCLA)
Foyle	Gary Middleton*	Elisha McCallion; Raymond McCartney*	Mark H. Durkan*; **Colum Eastwood***	Julia Kee	Colm Cavanagh		Shannon Downey	Stuart Canning	John Lindsay (CISTA); **Eamonn McCann*** (PBP); Arthur McGuinness (Ind.)
Lagan Valley	Paul Givan*; Brenda Hale*; Edwin Poots*	Peter Doran	Pat Catney	Robbie Butler*; Jenny Palmer*	Trevor Lunn*	Samuel Morrison	Dan Barrios-O'Neill	Matthew Robinson	Keith Gray (Ind.); Jonny Orr (Ind.)
Mid Ulster	Keith Buchanan*	Linda Dillon*; Ian Milne*; **Michelle O'Neill***	Patsy McGlone*	Sandra Overend*	Fay Watson	Hannah Loughrin	Stefan Taylor		Hugh McCloy (Ind.); Hugh Scullion (WP)
Newry and Armagh	William Irwin*	Cathal Boylan*; Megan Fearon*; Conor Murphy*	Justin McNulty*	Danny Kennedy*	Jackie Coade		Rowan Tunnicliffe		Emmet Crossan (CISTA)
North Antrim	Paul Frew*; Phillip Logan*; Mervyn Storey*	Philip McGuigan*	Connor Duncan	Robin Swann*	Patricia O'Lynn	**Jim Allister***; Timothy Gaston	Mark Bailey		Monica Digney (Ind.); Adam McBride (Ind.)
North Down	Gordon Dunne*; Alex Easton*	Kieran Maxwell	Caoímhe McNeill	Alan Chambers*; William Cudworth	Stephen Farry*		**Steven Agnew***	Frank Shivers	Chris Carter (Ind.); Melanie Kennedy (Ind.); Gavan Reynolds (Ind.)
South Antrim	Pam Cameron*; Trevor Clarke*; Paul Girvan*	Declan Kearney*	Roisin Lynch	Steve Aiken*; Adrian Cochrane-Watson^	David Ford*	Richard Cairns	Eleanor Bailey	Mark Logan	Ivanka Antova (PBP); David McMaster (Ind.)
South Down	Jim Wells*	Sinéad Ennis; Chris Hazzard*	Sinéad Bradley*; Colin McGrath*	Harold McKee*	Patrick Brown	Lyle Rea	Hannah George	Gary Hynds	Patrick Clarke (Ind.)
Strangford	Simon Hamilton*; Michelle McIlveen*; Peter Weir**	Dermot Kennedy	Joe Boyle	**Mike Nesbitt***; Philip Smith*	Kellie Armstrong*	Stephen Cooper	Ricky Bamford	Scott Benton	Jonathan Bell* (Ind.); Jimmy Menagh (Ind.)
Upper Bann	Jonathan Buckley; Carla Lockhart*	John O'Dowd*; Nuala Toman	Dolores Kelly^	Doug Beattie*; Jo-Anne Dobson*	Tara Doyle	Roy Ferguson	Simon Lee	Ian Nichols	Colin Craig (WP)
West Tyrone	Thomas Buchanan*	Michaela Boyle*; Declan McAleer*; Barry McElduff*	Daniel McCrossan*	Alicia Clarke	Stephen Donnelly	Charlie Chittick	Ciaran McClean	Roger Lomas	Barry Brown (CISTA); Corey French (Ind.); Sorcha McAnespy (Ind.); Roisin McMackin (Ind.); Susan-Anne White (Ind.)

Gerry Mullan, who was an MLA for the SDLP before the dissolution, stood as an independent after having been deselected by the party. Jonathan Bell, who was suspended from the DUP, was also standing as an independent. Both failed to get elected.

== Members not seeking re-election ==
MLA	Party	Constituency
Sydney Anderson	DUP	Upper Bann
Sammy Douglas	DUP	Belfast East
Alastair Ross	DUP	East Antrim
Martin McGuinness	Sinn Féin	Foyle
Caitríona Ruane	Sinn Féin	South Down
Catherine Seeley	Sinn Féin	Upper Bann
Ross Hussey	UUP	West Tyrone

== Campaign ==
The Renewable Heat Incentive scandal remained central in the campaign. Sinn Féin said they would not return to government with the DUP while questions over RHI remain over the DUP's leader, Foster. There were concerns about deteriorating cross-community relationships. If the two parties emerged as the largest in their communities and could not resolve the issue, direct rule by the UK government could be imposed.

The UUP leader, Mike Nesbitt, promoted the possibility of a UUP/SDLP administration. He said he would give his voting preference after the UUP candidates to the SDLP, although he said he would not tell UUP voters what to do with their later preferences. Other UUP candidates opposed the action, saying they will give later preferences to other unionist candidates over the SDLP, and one UUP councillor resigned from the party in protest.

The DUP criticised Nesbitt's position and campaigned arguing that splitting the unionist vote could help Sinn Féin come out as the largest party.

Brexit was also an issue. In the UK-wide referendum on EU membership on 23 June 2016, 56% of voters in Northern Ireland voted to "Remain" a member of the European Union while 44% voted to "Leave". The DUP supported the UK leaving the EU, while nationalist parties and most others opposed, fearing among other things the possibility of a hard border resulting with the Republic of Ireland. It became known during the campaign that the DUP spent £282,000 on a pro-Brexit advert in a newspaper that did not appear in Northern Ireland. The money came from the Constitutional Research Council, a minor pro-union group chaired by the former vice-chair of the Scottish Conservative Party Richard Cook.

Position on European Union membership referendum	Political parties	Ref
Remain	Alliance Party of Northern Ireland	
Remain	Green Party Northern Ireland	
Remain	Sinn Féin	
Remain	Social Democratic and Labour Party (SDLP)	
Remain	Ulster Unionist Party (UUP)	
Leave
Leave	Democratic Unionist Party (DUP)	
Leave	People Before Profit Alliance (PBP)	
Leave	Traditional Unionist Voice (TUV)	

The Alliance Party campaigned on their opposition to sectarianism. People Before Profit focused on their opposition to austerity.

== Opinion polling ==
=== Graphical summary ===
View source data.

Pollster	Client	Date(s) conducted	Sample size	DUP (U)	SF (N)	UUP (U)	SDLP (N)	Alliance (O)	TUV (U)	Green (O)	PBP (O)	Others	Lead
2017 Assembly Election		2 Mar 2017	–	28.1%	27.9%	12.9%	11.9%	9.1%	2.6%	2.3%	1.8%	3.7%	0.2%
Lucid Talk	N/A	24–26 Feb 2017	1,580	26.3%	25.3%	13.9%	12.2%	9.5%	4.4%	3.4%	2.4%	2.7%	1.0%
Lucid Talk	N/A	26–28 Jan 2017	1,580	25.9%	25.1%	13.9%	12.4%	8.9%	4.3%	3.9%	2.7%	3.1%	0.8%
2016 Assembly Election		5 May 2016	–	29.2%	24.0%	12.6%	12.0%	7.0%	3.4%	2.7%	2.0%	7.1%	5.2%

* (U): Unionist, (N): Nationalist, (O): Other

== Results ==
Result by constituencies

Map showing turnout and change in turnout from 2016

=== Overall results ===
Party	Votes	%	+/–	Seats			
Party	Votes	%	+/–	Assembly	+/–	Executive	+/–
Democratic Unionist Party	225,413	28.06	-1.1	28	-10	5	–
Sinn Féin	224,245	27.91	+3.9	27	-1	4	–
Ulster Unionist Party	103,314	12.86	+0.3	10	-6	1	+1
Social Democratic and Labour Party	95,958	11.95	-0.1	12	–	1	+1
Alliance Party of Northern Ireland	72,717	9.05	+2.1	8	–	1	+1
Traditional Unionist Voice	20,523	2.55	-0.9	1	–	–	–
Green Party Northern Ireland	18,527	2.31	-0.4	2	–	–	–
People Before Profit Alliance	14,100	1.76	-0.2	1	-1	–	–
Progressive Unionist Party	5,590	0.70	-0.2	–	–	–	–
Northern Ireland Conservatives	2,399	0.30	-0.1	–	–	–	–
Cross-Community Labour Alternative	2,009	0.25		–	–	–	–
UK Independence Party	1,579	0.20	-1.3	–	–	–	–
Citizens Independent Social Thought Alliance	1,273	0.16	-0.2	–	–	–	–
Workers' Party	1,261	0.16		–	–	–	–
Independent	14,407	1.79	-1.5	1	–	–	-1
Total	803,315	100.00	–	90	-18	12	2
Valid votes	803,315	98.84					
Invalid/blank votes	9,468	1.16					
Total votes	812,783	100.00					
Registered voters/turnout	1,254,709	64.78					

=== Seat changes compared to a notional result from 2016 with a 90-seat Assembly ===
Psephologist Nicholas Whyte estimated the likely result in the 2016 election had it been fought with 5-seat constituencies rather than six-seat constituencies. This table shows the different result, and compares the actual result in 2017 to this notional result.

Party	MLAs elected in 2016	Notional 2016	MLAs elected in 2017	Change from notional 2016 result	Designation
DUP	38	33	28	▼5	Unionist
Sinn Féin	28	23	27	▲4	Nationalist
UUP	16	11	10	▼1	Unionist
SDLP	12	11	12	▲1	Nationalist
Alliance	8	8	8	Steady	Other
Green (NI)	2	2	2	Steady	Other
People Before Profit	2	1	1	Steady	Other
TUV	1	1	1	Steady	Unionist
Independent	1	0	1	▲1	Unionist
Total	108	90	90	Steady	

=== Distribution of seats by constituency ===
Party affiliation of the five Assembly members returned by each constituency. The first column indicates the party of the Member of the House of Commons (MP) returned by the corresponding parliamentary constituency in the general election of 7 May 2015 (under the "first past the post" method).

	2015 MP	Constituency	Candi- dates	Total seats	PBP	Green	Sinn Féin	SDLP	Alli- ance	UUP	DUP	TUV	Ind.	Seat gained by	Seat formerly held by
1	DUP	North Antrim	–	5	–	–	1	–	–	1	2	1	–	–	DUP
2	DUP	East Antrim	–	5	–	–	–	–	1	2	2	–	–	UUP	SF DUP
3	UUP	South Antrim	–	5	–	–	1	–	1	1	2	–	–	–	DUP
4	DUP	Belfast North	–	5	–	–	2	1	–	–	2	–	–	–	DUP
5	SF	Belfast West	–	5	1	–	4	–	–	–	–	–	–	–	SDLP
6	SDLP	Belfast South	–	5	–	1	1	1	1	–	1	–	–	–	DUP
7	DUP	Belfast East	–	5	–	–	–	–	2	1	2	–	–	–	DUP
8	Ind.	North Down	–	5	–	1	–	–	1	1	2	–	–	–	DUP
9	DUP	Strangford	–	5	–	–	–	–	1	1	3	–	–	–	UUP
10	DUP	Lagan Valley	–	5	–	–	–	1	1	1	2	–		SDLP	UUP DUP
11	DUP	Upper Bann	–	5	–	–	1	1	–	1	2	–	–	SDLP	UUP SF
12	SDLP	South Down	–	5	–	–	2	2	–	–	1	–	–	–	UUP
13	SF	Newry and Armagh	–	5	–	–	3	1	–	–	1	–	–	–	UUP
14	UUP	Fermanagh & South Tyrone	–	5	–	–	3	–	–	1	1	–	–	SF	DUP SDLP
15	SF	West Tyrone	–	5	–	–	3	1	–	–	1	–	–	–	UUP
16	SF	Mid Ulster	–	5	–	–	3	1	–	–	1	–	–	–	UUP
17	SDLP	Foyle	–	5	–	–	2	2	–	–	1	–	–	–	PBP
18	DUP	East Londonderry	–	5	–	–	1	1	–	–	2	–	1	–	DUP
18		Total	–	90	1	2	27	12	8	10	28	1	1		
		Change since dissolution	–	–18	–1	0	–1	–	–	−6	−10	–	–	–	–
		Assembly at dissolution	–	108	2	2	28	12	8	16	38	1	1	–	–
		Change during Assembly term	–	–	–	–	–	–	–	–	–	–	–	–	–
		Elected on 5 May 2011	218	108	2	2	28	12	8	16	38	1	1	–	–
		Elected on 7 March 2007	256	108	–	1	28	16	7	18	36	–	1	1 Prog. U.	–
		Elected on 23 November 2003		108	–	–	24	18	6	27	30	–	1	1 Prog. U.	1 UKUP
		Elected on 25 June 1998		108	–	–	18	24	6	28	20	–	4	2 Prog. U.	5 UKUP, 2 NIWC

- Three of the four independents elected in 1998 ran as Independent Unionists
- NIWC = Northern Ireland Women's Coalition; Prog. U. = Progressive Unionist Party; TUV = Traditional Unionist Voice; UKUP = UK Unionist Party

=== Share of first-preference votes ===
Percentage of each constituency's first-preference votes. Four highest percentages in each constituency shaded; absolute majorities underlined. The constituencies are arranged in the geographic order described for the table above; click the icon next to "Constituency" to see them in alphabetical order.

The totals given here are the sum of all valid ballots cast in each constituency, and the percentages are based on such totals. The turnout percentages in the last column, however, are based upon all ballots cast, which also include anything from twenty to a thousand invalid ballots in each constituency. The total valid ballots' percentage of the eligible electorate can correspondingly differ by 0.1% to 2% from the turnout percentage.

	2015 MP	MP's % of 2015 vote	Constituency	PBP	Green	Sinn Féin	SDLP	Alli- ance	UUP	DUP	TUV	Ind.	Others	Total votes	Eligible elector- ate	Turn- out %
1	DUP	43.2%	North Antrim		1.1	15.8	7.3	5.4	12.5	40.6	16.0	1.1		–	–	63.2%
2	DUP	36.1%	East Antrim		2.1	9.9	4.1	16.0	22.7	35.2	4.1	0.3	5.7	–	–	60.1%
3	UUP	32.7%	South Antrim	1.3	1.2	16.3	9.5	12.5	20.8	33.7	3.2	1.2	0.5	–	–	62.4%
4	DUP	47.0%	Belfast North	3.8	1.7	29.4	13.1	8.4	5.8	32.1		0.2	5.5	–	–	61.8%
5	SF	54.2%	Belfast West	14.9	0.6	61.8	8.6	1.9	1.2	10.1			1.0	–	–	66.8%
6	SDLP	24.5%	Belfast South	1.8	9.9	17.7	19.4	17.8	9.0	20.8	1.6		2.1	–	–	64.0%
7	DUP	49.3%	Belfast East		3.6	2.9	0.6	31.4	13.1	37.6	2.3	0.2	8.4	–	–	63.0%
8	Ind.	49.2%	North Down		13.7	1.6	1.8	18.6	21.5	37.5		3.6	1.7	–	–	59.2%
9	DUP	44.4%	Strangford		2.4	2.9	7.9	15.0	20.0	39.9	3.4	8.0	0.5	–	–	60.9%
10	DUP	47.9%	Lagan Valley		2.0	4.0	8.4	13.5	25.2	41.3	3.1	2.1	0.4	–	–	62.6%
11	DUP	32.7%	Upper Bann		1.1	27.8	9.9	5.3	20.6	32.8	2.0		0.6	–	–	62.5%
12	SDLP	42.3%	South Down		1.0	38.6	25.2	9.2	8.4	15.8	1.3	0.4	0.2	–	–	66.2%
13	SF	41.1%	Newry & Armagh		0.5	48.3	16.4	2.6	13.2	17.8			1.3	–	–	69.4%
14	UUP	46.4%	Fermanagh & S. Tyrone		1.1	42.1	9.8	2.7	11.6	29.8	1.5		1.3	–	–	72.6%
15	SF	43.5%	West Tyrone		0.9	48.1	14.2	2.8	8.2	20.4	1.9	2.4	0.9	–	–	69.9%
16	SF	48.7%	Mid Ulster		0.5	52.8	12.9	2.0	9.1	19.3	2.5	0.5	0.4	–	–	72.4%
17	SDLP	47.9%	Foyle	10.7	0.5	36.6	31.8	2.5	3.7	13.4		0.1	0.6	–	–	65.0%
18	DUP	42.2%	East Londonderry	1.2	0.7	25.8	7.9	4.4	6.7	33.5	2.5	14.6	2.6	–	–	62.7%
18			Northern Ireland	1.8	2.3	27.9	11.9	9.1	12.9	28.1	2.6	1.8	1.8	812,783	1,254,709	64.8%
			Change since 2016	–0.2	–0.4	+3.9	–0.1	+2.1	+0.3	–1.1	–0.9	–2.1	–1.5	+109,039	–26,886	+10.0%
			Election of May 2016	2.0	2.7	24.0	12.0	7.0	12.6	29.2	3.4	3.9	3.3	703,744	1,281,595	54.9%
			Election of May 2011		0.9	26.9	14.2	7.7	13.2	30.0	2.5	2.2	2.3	661,736	1,210,009	55.6%
			Election of March 2007		1.7	26.2	15.2	5.2	14.9	30.1		3.8	2.8	690,313	1,107,904	62.9%
			Election of Nov. 2003		0.4	23.5	17.0	3.7	22.7	25.7		5.6	2.8	692,026	1,097,526	63.1%
			Election of June 1998		0.1	17.6	22.0	6.5	21.3	18.1		10.9	3.5	823,565	1,178,556	69.9%

- Independent Unionist vote in 1998 (2.8%) included in the Independent column (not "others"). TUV = Traditional Unionist Voice.

=== Incumbents defeated ===
MLA	Party	Constituency
Nelson McCausland	DUP	Belfast North
Emma Little Pengelly	DUP	Belfast South
Alex Attwood	SDLP	Belfast West
Oliver McMullan	Sinn Féin	East Antrim
Adrian McQuillan	DUP	East Londonderry
Gerry Mullan	Independent	East Londonderry
Maurice Morrow	DUP	Fermanagh and South Tyrone
Richie McPhillips	SDLP	Fermanagh and South Tyrone
Eamonn McCann	People Before Profit	Foyle
Brenda Hale	DUP	Lagan Valley
Jenny Palmer	UUP	Lagan Valley
Sandra Overend	UUP	Mid Ulster
Danny Kennedy	UUP	Newry and Armagh
Phillip Logan	DUP	North Antrim
Trevor Clarke	DUP	South Antrim
Harold McKee	UUP	South Down
Philip Smith	UUP	Strangford
Jonathan Bell	Independent	Strangford
Jo-Anne Dobson	UUP	Upper Bann

== Aftermath ==
The election marked a significant shift in Northern Ireland's politics, being the first election since Ireland's partition in 1921 in which unionist parties did not win a majority of seats, and the first time that unionist and nationalist parties received equal representation in the Assembly (39 members between Sinn Féin and the SDLP, 39 members between the DUP, UUP, and TUV). However, a plurality of MLAs were unionists, as Independent MLA Claire Sugden designates as such, leaving 40 unionist MLAs and 39 nationalist MLAs. The DUP's loss of seats also prevented it from unilaterally using the petition of concern mechanism, which the party had controversially used to block measures such as the introduction of same-sex marriage to Northern Ireland.

UUP leader Mike Nesbitt announced his resignation, following the party's failure to make any breakthrough.

Sinn Féin reiterated that it would not return to a power-sharing arrangement with the DUP without significant changes in the DUP's approach, including Foster not becoming First Minister until the RHI investigation is complete. The parties had three weeks to form an administration; failing that, new elections would likely be called.

While unionism lost its overall majority in the Assembly, the result was characterised by political analyst Matthew Whiting as being more about voters seeking competent local leadership, and about the DUP having less success than Sinn Féin in motivating its traditional voter base to turn out, than about a significant move towards a united Ireland.

Secretary of State for Northern Ireland James Brokenshire gave the political parties more time to reach a coalition agreement after the 27 March deadline passed. Sinn Féin called for fresh elections if agreement could not be reached. Negotiations were paused over Easter, but Brokenshire threatened a new election or direct rule if no agreement could be reached by early May. On 18 April, the Conservative Party Prime Minister, Theresa May, then called a snap general election for 8 June 2017. A new deadline of 29 June was then set for power-sharing talks.

The 2017 UK general election saw both the DUP and Sinn Féin advance, with the UUP and SDLP losing all their MPs. The overall result saw the Conservatives losing seats, resulting in a hung parliament. May sought to continue as Prime Minister running a minority administration through seeking the support of the DUP. Various commentators suggested this raised problems for the UK government's role as a neutral arbiter in Northern Ireland, as is required under the Good Friday Agreement. Talks restarted on 12 June 2017, while a Conservative–DUP agreement was announced and published on 26 June.

A new deadline was set for 29 June, but it appeared that no agreement would be reached in time, with the main sticking point over Sinn Féin's desire for an Irish Language Act, rejected by the DUP, while Sinn Féin rejected a hybrid act that also covers Ulster Scots. The deadline passed with no resolution. Brokenshire extended the time for talks, but Sinn Féin and the DUP remained pessimistic about any quick resolution.

Negotiations resumed in the autumn but failed, leaving it in the hands of the UK Parliament to pass a budget for the ongoing financial year of 2017–18. The bill, which began its passage on 13 November, would if enacted release the final 5% of Northern Ireland's block grant. Talks between the DUP and Sinn Féin recommenced on 6 February 2018, only days before the mid-February deadline where, in the absence of an agreement, a regional budget would have to be imposed by Westminster. Despite being attended by Theresa May and Leo Varadkar, the talks collapsed and DUP negotiator Simon Hamilton stated "significant and serious gaps remain between ourselves and Sinn Féin". The stalemate continued into September, at which point Northern Ireland reached 590 days without a fully functioning administration, eclipsing the record set in Belgium between April 2010 and December 2011.

Northern Ireland (Executive Formation and Exercise of Functions) Act 2018
- Act of Parliament
- Parliament of the United Kingdom
- Long title: An Act to facilitate the formation of an Executive in Northern Ireland by extending the time for making Ministerial appointments following the election of the Northern Ireland Assembly on 2 March 2017; and to make provision about the exercise of governmental functions in, or in relation to, Northern Ireland in the absence of Northern Ireland Ministers.
- Citation: 2018 c. 28

Dates
- Royal assent: 1 November 2018
Other legislation
Repealed by	Northern Ireland (Ministers, Elections and Petitions of Concern) Act 2022

Status: Repealed

Text of statute as originally enacted

On 18 October the Northern Ireland Secretary Karen Bradley introduced the Northern Ireland (Executive Formation and Exercise of Functions) Bill, removing the time frame of an Assembly election until 26 March 2019, which could be replaced by a later date by the Northern Ireland Secretary for once only, and during which the Northern Ireland Executive could be formed at any time, enabling civil servants to take a certain degree of departmental decisions that would be in public interest, and also allowing Ministers of the Crown to have several Northern Ireland appointments. The bill's third reading was passed in the House of Commons and in the House of Lords on 24 and 30 October respectively. The bill became the Northern Ireland (Executive Formation and Exercise of Functions) Act 2018 (c. 28) and came into effect after it received royal assent and was passed on 1 November.

During a question period to the Northern Ireland Secretary on 31 October, Karen Bradley announced that she would hold a meeting in Belfast the following day with the main parties regarding the implementation of the Bill (which was not an Act yet on that day) and next steps towards the restoration of the devolution and that she would fly to Dublin alongside Theresa May's de facto deputy David Lidington to hold an inter-governmental conference with the Irish Government. No deal was reached at that time.

On 24 July 2019, the Northern Ireland (Executive Formation etc) Act 2019 further extended the deadline for formation of an executive to 13 January 2020. It also introduced measures requiring the Secretary of State to liberalize abortion law and provisionally legalize same-sex marriage. (Both marriage and health are devolved matters, but legislating on these contentious issues was hampered by the lack of a functioning legislature. In relation to abortion, Westminster had a responsibility to act as NI law had been ruled by the European Court of Human Rights to be in breach of human rights, which are a reserved matter.) Unionist MPs attempted to reconvene the Assembly on 21 October to pass legislation to defeat the measures, but no business could be conducted due to a boycott by Sinn Féin. The Act additionally formed part of the 2019 prorogation controversy by requiring the Secretary of State to make regular reports to Parliament, thus preventing prorogation.

In early January 2020, the British and Irish governments announced the text of a deal to restore power sharing in Northern Ireland, and to restore devolution. The Northern Ireland Executive was finally restored on 11 January 2020, with Foster returning as First Minister and Michelle O'Neill of Sinn Féin as deputy First Minister.

== See also ==
- History of Northern Ireland
- History of the United Kingdom
- 2020 in the United Kingdom
- 2020 in politics and government
