= 2011 Lisburn City Council election =

Local government election in Northern Ireland

- 5 May 2011

All 30 seats to Lisburn City Council 16 seats needed for a majority
	First party	Second party	Third party
Party	DUP	Sinn Féin	UUP
Seats won	14	5	5
Seat change	▲1	▲1	▼2
	Fourth party	Fifth party
Party	Alliance	SDLP
Seats won	3	3
Seat change	Steady	Steady
- Party with the most votes by district.

Elections to Lisburn City Council were held on 5 May 2011 on the same day as the other Northern Irish local government elections. The election used five district electoral areas to elect a total of 30 councillors.

== Election results ==
Lisburn City Council Election Result 2011
Party	Seats	Gains	Losses	Net gain/loss	Seats %	Votes %	Votes	+/−
DUP	14	1	0	▲1	46.7	41.0	16,767	▲0.3
Sinn Féin	5	0	0	▲1	16.7	20.3	8,328	▲3.7
UUP	5	0	2	▼2	16.7	16.6	6,803	▼6.1
Alliance	3	0	0	Steady	10.0	10.4	4,243	▲1.2
SDLP	3	1	1	Steady	10.0	8.8	3,600	▲0.3
Green (NI)	0	0	0	Steady	0.0	0.9	372	▲0.2
TUV	0	0	0	Steady	0.0	0.7	289	New
Independent	0	0	0	Steady	0.0	0.7	288	▲0.7
NI Conservatives	0	0	0	Steady	0.0	0.6	242	▼0.1

Note: "Votes" are the first preference votes.

== Districts summary ==
Results of the Lisburn City Council election, 2011 by district
Ward	%	Cllrs	%	Cllrs	%	Cllrs	%	Cllrs	%	Cllrs	%	Cllrs	Total Cllrs
Ward	DUP		Sinn Féin		UUP		Alliance		SDLP		Others		Total Cllrs
Downshire	53.2	3	1.4	0	24.0	1	14.3	1	3.4	0	3.7	0	5
Dunmurry Cross	10.8	1	65.7	5	3.3	1	4.4	0	15.8	1	0.0	0	7
Killultagh	47.7	3	9.0	0	16.8	1	10.4	0	10.5	1	5.6	0	5
Lisburn Town North	47.8	3	4.5	0	25.0	2	14.0	1	5.8	1	2.9	0	7
Lisburn Town South	60.9	4	3.6	0	17.0	1	9.7	1	5.2	0	3.6	0	6
Total	41.0	14	20.3	5	16.6	5	10.4	3	8.8	3	2.9	0	30

== Districts results ==
=== Downshire ===
2005: 2 x DUP, 2 x UUP, 1 x Alliance
2011: 3 x DUP, 1 x UUP, 1 x Alliance
2005-2011 Change: DUP gain from UUP

Downshire - 5 seats
Party	Candidate	FPv%	Count						
Party	Candidate	FPv%	1	2	3	4	5	6	7
DUP	Allan Ewart*	20.09%	1,591						
DUP	Paul Stewart	19.64%	1,555						
DUP	Uel Mackin	12.51%	1,070	1,297.46	1,486.91				
Alliance	Jennifer Coulter*	14.13%	1,136	1,142.12	1,147.82	1,156.82	1,173.82	1,194.59	1,393.59
UUP	James Baird	13.28%	1,052	1,065.94	1,081.99	1,143.64	1,143.64	1,248.96	1,266.03
UUP	Alasdair O'Hara	5.62%	445	449.59	453.64	465.49	466.49	520.82	532.12
UUP	Richard Price	5.11%	405	411.12	418.77	440.52	441.52	490.23	499.98
SDLP	Christine Wilson	3.40%	269	269.68	271.78	273.58	348.75	352.2	
TUV	Kaye Kilpatrick	3.65%	289	294.78	297.18	307.68	308.68		
Sinn Féin	Fionnu McCaughley	1.35%	107	107.34	107.49	107.49			
Electorate: 13,764 Valid: 7,919 (57.53%) Spoilt: 114 Quota: 1,320 Turnout: 8,033 (58.36%)

=== Dunmurry Cross ===
2005: 4 x Sinn Féin, 2 x SDLP, 1 x DUP
2011: 5 x Sinn Féin, 1 x SDLP, 1 x DUP
2005-2011 Change: Sinn Féin gain from SDLP

Dunmurry Cross - 7 seats
Party	Candidate	FPv%	Count						
Party	Candidate	FPv%	1	2	3	4	5	6	7
Sinn Féin	David Bell	17.19%	1,796						
Sinn Féin	Charlene O'Hara	13.07%	1,365						
Sinn Féin	Arder Carson	12.81%	1,338						
Sinn Féin	Stephen Magennis	11.02%	1,151	1,553.57					
Sinn Féin	Angela Nelson*	11.58%	1,210	1,249.96	1,479.24				
DUP	Margaret Tolerton	10.84%	1,132	1,132.81	1,133.45	1,134.41	1,357.41		
SDLP	Brian Heading*	9.77%	1,020	1,041.6	1,043.68	1,052.32	1,059.32	1,079.9	1,272.03
SDLP	Matthew McDermott	6.02%	629	637.64	639.08	646.44	653.71	684.79	843.54
Alliance	Aaron McIntyre	4.38%	458	459.89	460.53	462.45	533.61	539.91	
UUP	Mark Hill	3.31%	346	346.81	346.81	346.97			
Electorate: 19,745 Valid: 10,445 (52.90%) Spoilt: 251 Quota: 1,306 Turnout: 10,696 (54.17%)

=== Killultagh ===
2005: 3 x DUP, 1 x UUP, 1 x SDLP
2011: 3 x DUP, 1 x UUP, 1 x SDLP
2005-2011 Change: No change

Killultagh - 5 seats
Party	Candidate	FPv%	Count					
Party	Candidate	FPv%	1	2	3	4	5	6
DUP	Thomas Beckett*	20.54%	1,756					
DUP	James Tinsley*	18.24%	1,559					
SDLP	Pat Catney	10.50%	898	902.37	902.93	923.23	1,526.23	
UUP	Jim Dillon*	8.91%	762	788.03	794.91	917.97	919.97	1,425.97
DUP	John Palmer	8.94%	764	1,007.01	1,108.05	1,211.76	1,216.49	1,342.28
Alliance	Owen Gawith	10.42%	891	897.46	899.86	978.92	1,036.27	1,102.27
UUP	Roy Hanna	7.91%	676	693.1	698.3	790.95	795.22	
Sinn Féin	Mary-Kate Quinn	9.03%	772	773.14	773.7	778.08		
Independent	Cecil Calvert*	2.68%	229	249.33	253.17			
NI Conservatives	Steve McIlwrath	2.83%	242	250.17	251.53			
Electorate: 16,299 Valid: 8,549 (52.45%) Spoilt: 140 Quota: 1,425 Turnout: 8,689 (53.31%)

=== Lisburn Town North ===
2005: 3 x DUP, 3 x UUP, 1 x Alliance
2011: 3 x DUP, 2 x UUP, 1 x Alliance, 1 x SDLP
2005-2011 Change: SDLP gain from UUP

Lisburn Town North - 7 seats
Party	Candidate	FPv%	Count							
Party	Candidate	FPv%	1	2	3	4	5	6	7	8
DUP	Paul Givan*	16.68%	1,528							
DUP	Jonathan Craig*	16.17%	1,481							
Alliance	Brian Doran	14.03%	1,285							
DUP	William Leathem*	9.71%	889	1,164						
UUP	Ronnie Crawford*	10.52%	963	986.25	1,012.17	1,033.77	1,119.77	1,148.77		
UUP	Brian Bloomfield	6.79%	622	630.75	642.27	661.47	681.68	705.96	708.96	1,150.96
SDLP	John Drake	5.78%	529	531	533.4	566.4	567.88	667.21	1,016.97	1,035.53
DUP	Ben Mallon	5.25%	481	518.25	784.89	794.13	799.98	814.5	825.98	914.14
UUP	David Archer	5.91%	541	555.75	571.59	583.11	629.15	656.63	660.87	
Sinn Féin	Terry Quinn	4.50%	412	412.25	413.21	416.21	416.21	443.65		
Green (NI)	Connor Quinn	2.87%	263	265.25	267.41	302.69	306.93			
UUP	Neil McNickle	1.79%	164	169.5	172.38	177.54				
Electorate: 17,438 Valid: 9,158 (52.52%) Spoilt: 127 Quota: 1,145 Turnout: 9,285 (53.24%)

=== Lisburn Town South ===
2005: 4 x DUP, 1 x UUP, 1 x Alliance
2011: 4 x DUP, 1 x UUP, 1 x Alliance
2005-2011 Change: No change

Lisburn Town South - 6 seats
Party	Candidate	FPv%	Count								
Party	Candidate	FPv%	1	2	3	4	5	6	7	8	9
DUP	Paul Porter*	27.57%	1,340								
DUP	Andrew Ewing*	14.42%	701								
DUP	Jenny Palmer*	13.31%	647	1,018.42							
DUP	Roy Young	5.62%	273	457.73	702.6						
Alliance	Stephen Martin	9.73%	473	483.78	488.48	496.48	496.74	551.72	587.19	663.15	756.15
UUP	Alan Carlisle	10.70%	520	553.81	588.12	612.57	615.41	628.41	633.88	639.88	646.88
UUP	Tim Mitchell	6.32%	307	322.19	346.16	361	362.76	375.74	378.74	380.29	392.29
Sinn Féin	Patricia Magennis	3.64%	177	177.49	177.49	177.49	177.49	179.98	204.98	266.96	
SDLP	Aisling Twomey	2.65%	129	133.9	135.78	137.78	137.88	141.86	189.86		
SDLP	Marzena Czarnecka	2.59%	126	126.49	128.37	129.37	129.37	135.37			
Green (NI)	Luke Robinson	2.24%	109	113.9	117.66	121.13	121.25				
Independent	Colin Preen	1.21%	59	65.37	67.72						
Electorate: 11,107 Valid: 4,861 (43.77%) Spoilt: 106 Quota: 695 Turnout: 4,967 (44.72%)
