= Red Sky scandal =

Northern Irish political scandal

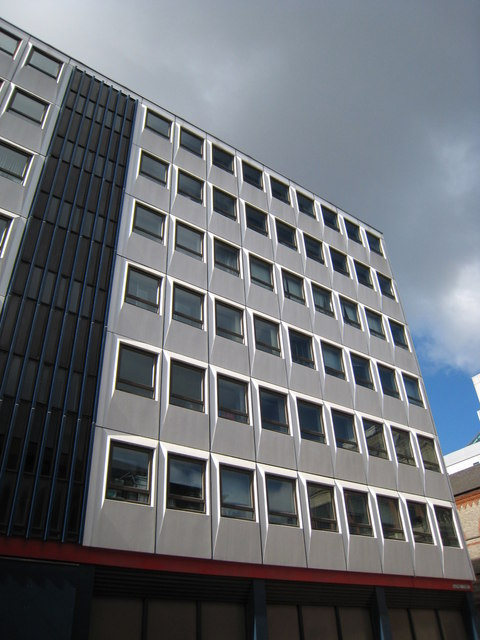
The Housing Centre, Belfast

The Red Sky scandal was a political scandal in Northern Ireland that emerged in 2010 following a Spotlight investigation into Red Sky, a company based in Belfast which was awarded a maintenance contract by the Northern Ireland Housing Executive. The investigation showed financial irregularities at the company and showed that work was being carried out at a "poor standard" in west Belfast. In April 2011, the £8 million contract was cancelled after the firm was found to be "significantly overcharging". Members of the Democratic Unionist Party (DUP) intervened and campaigned for an extension to the Red Sky contract, citing "sectarian bias" for the contract being cancelled.

Jenny Palmer, a DUP councillor, sat on the Housing Executive board. The board was due to discuss a request from the DUP's Minister for Social Development Nelson McCausland to extend Red Sky's contract. She alleged that Stephen Brimstone, McCausland's special adviser, pressured her into changing her vote at the meeting.

The Housing Executive chairman said that McCausland's interference into the Housing Executive "amounted to an unwarranted and improper interference".

== Background ==
In 2010, a BBC investigation found that there were complaints against the firm Red Sky dating back to 2007. The complaints centred around Red Sky's work in west Belfast being of "poor standard". In two cases, it was discovered that Red Sky had billed the Housing Executive for work that was never actually completed. In April 2011, the company went into voluntary administration after the Housing Executive had cancelled their contract after an investigation concluded that there were concerns of fraud.

=== DUP intervention ===
Nelson McCausland, the Minister for Social Development, asked the Housing Executive to reinstate Red Sky's contract until such a time where a system for awarding new contracts is introduced. At an emergency meeting of the Housing Executive, the board decided not to overturn its decision.

The Housing Executive "raised concerns" in a letter to its board members about meetings "held between McCausland, First Minister of Northern Ireland Peter Robinson and other DUP elected representatives with the former senior management at Red Sky." The executive asked whether the meetings "constituted canvassing and lobbying for government contracts in breach of public procurement principles". The executive also called McCausland's intervention on the issue "incomprehensible".

A meeting with senior DUP politicians led by Robinson took place with Housing Executive officials. Minutes from the meeting show that Robinson "said in his opinion, Housing Executive staff must bear some of the blame for overpayments". Brian Rowntree, Housing Executive chairman, wrote a letter following the meeting and told McCausland to "step back" and threatened legal action against the minister and his department.

The DUP believed that Red Sky was 'singled out' because it was a 'Protestant' firm. They claimed "sectarian bias" on part of the Housing Executive.

=== DUP whistleblower ===
Jenny Palmer sat on the Housing Executive board and alleged that on her way to the Housing Executive board meeting, McCausland's special advisor Stephen Brimstone called her and "pressured her" into changing her vote at the meeting. Brimstone wanted her to overturn the decision to cancel Red Sky's contract. She made the revelations two years after the board meeting.

She alleges that Brimstone told her "the party comes first". In the subsequent inquiry, Brimstone denied acting inappropriately and said he "struggles" to remember the conversation.

Palmer was later disciplined by the DUP and Brimstone was promoted to special advisor in the Office of the First Minister and deputy First Minister, serving Peter Robinson.

Palmer said that the DUP was to give her a public apology for her treatment, which didn't materialise. She said that there had been "an effort to keep the sectarian card alive" in relation to the board meeting.

== Committee inquiry ==
The Social Development Committee at the Northern Ireland Assembly held an inquiry into the Spotlight claims. The report concluded that McCausland "acted inappropriately" by asking for Red Sky's contract to be extended. Sinn Féin MLA Alex Maskey, deputy chairperson of the committee, said Palmer's evidence was "convincing, consistent and compelling".

The DUP MLAs on the committee, however, disagreed with the report and compiled a minority report which was in favour of McCausland. Their report said he "in fact ultimately supported the Housing Executive's decision to proceed with the termination of the contracts".

At a vote in the Assembly, MLAs voted to "note" the committee's report and it was passed by 55 votes to 32.
