= 1981 Ards Borough Council election =

Local government election in Northern Ireland

← 1977	20 May 1981	1985 →

All 17 seats to Ards Borough Council 9 seats needed for a majority
	First party	Second party	Third party
Party	DUP	UUP	Alliance
Seats won	7	3	3
Seat change	▲4	▼3	▼2
	Fourth party	Fifth party	Sixth party
Party	UPUP	NI Labour	SDLP
Seats won	2	1	1
Seat change	▲2	0	0
	Seventh party
Party	Independent
Seats won	0
Seat change	▼1

Elections to Ards Borough Council were held on 20 May 1981 on the same day as the other Northern Irish local government elections. The election used three district electoral areas to elect a total of 17 councillors.

== Election results ==
Ards Borough Council Election Result 1981
Party	Seats	Gains	Losses	Net gain/loss	Seats %	Votes %	Votes	+/−
DUP	7	4	0	▲4	41.2	37.1	8,120	▲23.3
UUP	3	0	3	▼3	17.6	21.7	4,759	▼10.1
Alliance	3	0	2	▼2	17.6	12.3	2,692	▼8.5
UPUP	2	2	0	0	11.8	12.9	2,816	New
NI Labour	1	0	0	0	5.9	6.5	1,424	▼1.5
SDLP	1	0	0	0	5.9	4.3	942	▼1.4
Ind. Unionist	0	0	1	▼1	0.0	4.8	311	▼1.7
Independent	0	0	0	0	0.0	3.3	738	▼5.3
Unionist Party NI	0	0	0	0	0.0	0.5	112	▼4.8

Note: "Votes" are the first preference votes.

== Districts summary ==
Results of the Ards Borough Council election, 1981 by district
Ward	%	Cllrs	%	Cllrs	%	Cllrs	%	Cllrs	%	Cllrs	%	Cllrs	%	Cllrs	Total Cllrs
Ward	DUP		UUP		Alliance		UPUP		NILP		SDLP		Others		Total Cllrs
Area A	32.0	2	24.7	2	9.6	1	14.3	1	0.0	0	11.9	1	7.5	0	7
Area B	40.2	3	14.1	0	12.6	1	16.0	1	17.1	1	0.0	0	0.0	0	6
Area C	39.5	2	28.8	1	15.5	1	6.1	0	0.0	0	0.0	0	10.1	0	4
Total	37.1	7	21.7	3	12.3	3	12.9	2	6.5	1	4.3	1	5.2	0	17

== Districts results ==
=== Area A ===
1977: 3 x UUP, 2 x Alliance, 1 x DUP, 1 x SDLP
1981: 2 x DUP, 2 x UUP, 1 x UPUP, 1 x SDLP, 1 x Alliance
1977-1981 Change: DUP and UPUP gain from UUP and Alliance

Ards Area A - 7 seats
Party	Candidate	FPv%	Count									
Party	Candidate	FPv%	1	2	3	4	5	6	7	8	9	10
UPUP	Gladys McIntyre	13.04%	1,034									
UUP	Robert Ambrose*	7.68%	609	610	627.04	653.64	692.04	747.52	758.64	1,021.64		
SDLP	Patrick Doherty*	11.88%	942	942.04	942.04	943.12	943.12	943.12	961.16	965.2	1,347.2	
DUP	Joseph Thompson*	11.57%	917	918.32	923.44	950.76	954.8	960.92	960.92	974.16	976.24	981.24
Alliance	William Sheldon*	5.39%	427	427.44	436.44	439.64	448.68	453.8	730.44	764.76	820.84	974.84
DUP	Oliver Johnston	11.04%	875	876.68	882.84	890.68	901.92	920.16	923.2	952.72	954.72	958.72
UUP	John Scott*	6.88%	545	548.48	576.72	592.08	633.6	758.12	790.32	878.6	882.84	886.84
DUP	Jim Shannon	9.35%	741	743.04	744.08	754.52	760.56	763.68	768.72	796.92	798.08	807.08
Independent	James McMullan	6.07%	481	481.64	484.64	486.68	486.68	488.68	492.68	495.72		
UUP	William Caughey*	4.28%	339	339.72	346.84	358.12	420.56	483.28	491.4			
Alliance	Alan Burnside	4.25%	337	337.36	341.36	346.16	348.2	367.36				
UUP	James Kennett	3.27%	259	260	271.08	278.6	307.92					
UUP	David Hamilton	2.64%	209	209.8	210.96	215.36						
UPUP	Frances Millar	1.26%	100	125.48	140.96							
Unionist Party NI	Michael Long	1.41%	112	113.52								
Electorate: 14,228 Valid: 7,927 (55.71%) Spoilt: 235 Quota: 991 Turnout: 8,162 (57.37%)

=== Area B ===
1977: 2 x UUP, 2 x Alliance, 1 x NILP, 1 x DUP
1981: 3 x DUP, 1 x NILP, 1 x UPUP, 1 x Alliance
1977-1981 Change: DUP (two seats) and UPUP gain from UUP (two seats) and Alliance

Ards Area B - 6 seats
Party	Candidate	FPv%	Count									
Party	Candidate	FPv%	1	2	3	4	5	6	7	8	9	10
DUP	Hugh Boyd*	20.16%	1,681									
NI Labour	Robert Gaw*	15.71%	1,310									
DUP	John Elliott	8.03%	670	1,036.27	1,044.46	1,066.06	1,070.82	1,084.82	1,093.18	1,113.92	1,141.51	1,182.71
DUP	Simpson Gibson	12.05%	1,005	1,067.06	1,071.02	1,083.75	1,086.93	1,100.93	1,105.93	1,125.96	1,138.81	1,167.29
Alliance	Owen Dorrian*	9.41%	784	786.61	803.89	835.65	838.65	841.19	1,059.78	1,086.68	1,108.78	1,154.96
UPUP	Robert Brown	6.09%	508	538.16	545.72	552.61	559.17	566.46	575.73	686.73	724.76	1,136.69
UUP	Hugh Patton	4.59%	383	387.35	392.57	396.65	485.84	558.85	570.57	599.14	1,004.54	1,078.36
UPUP	James Murray	5.61%	468	471.77	478.61	486.76	493.85	499.12	505.84	660.55	686.21	
UUP	Robert Hamilton	5.49%	458	465.54	469.68	475.02	502.29	558.03	569.21	593.6		
UPUP	Hugh Yeaman	4.32%	360	362.9	368.03	374.92	379.3	388.93	397.58			
Alliance	James Murphy	3.24%	270	270.29	273.53	286.5	289.59	294.86				
UUP	Edward McLoughlin	1.99%	166	166.87	169.03	174.66	192.2					
UUP	William Speers	1.94%	162	163.45	165.7	168.51						
NI Labour	John Gray	1.37%	114	115.16	164.12							
Electorate: 16,070 Valid: 8,339 (51.89%) Spoilt: 310 Quota: 1,192 Turnout: 8,649 (53.82%)

=== Area C ===
1977: 1 x UUP, 1 x Alliance, 1 x DUP, 1 x Independent Unionist
1981: 2 x DUP, 1 x UUP, 1 x Alliance
1977-1981 Change: DUP gain from Independent Unionist

Ards Area C - 4 seats
Party	Candidate	FPv%	Count									
Party	Candidate	FPv%	1	2	3	4	5	6	7	8	9	10
DUP	Thomas Gourley*	26.19%	1,479									
UUP	Hamilton McKeag*	19.16%	1,082	1,099.02	1,111.71	1,201.71						
DUP	John Hamilton	13.31%	752	1,041.8	1,057.72	1,082.41	1,087.33	1,112.61	1,187.61			
Alliance	Jim McBriar*	9.31%	526	528.76	535.22	541.22	547.78	559.01	598.88	902.72	908.72	1,113.72
UUP	Gordon Brown	5.91%	334	339.52	356.75	416.05	466.89	481.12	551.78	571.78	595.78	753.78
Ind. Unionist	John Shields*	5.51%	311	314.68	317.68	325.14	327.6	499.62	540.9	570.59	584.59	
Alliance	Kathleen Coulter	6.16%	348	350.53	353.53	362.53	362.53	377.53	388.99			
UPUP	Robert McKee	3.93%	222	226.14	294.6	303.52	307.62	317.62				
Independent	James Middleton	4.20%	237	240.22	247.22	255.45	257.91					
UUP	James Caughey	3.77%	213	217.83	224.83							
UPUP	Shirley McWhinney	2.20%	124	126.07								
Independent	Thomas Adair	0.35%	20	20.69								
Electorate: 9,936 Valid: 5,648 (56.84%) Spoilt: 168 Quota: 1,130 Turnout: 5,816 (58.53%)
