= Ards Area A =

District electoral areas in Ards, Northern Ireland

Ards Area A was one of the three district electoral areas in Ards, Northern Ireland which existed from 1973 to 1985. The district elected seven members to Ards Borough Council, and formed part of the North Down constituencies for the Northern Ireland Assembly and UK Parliament.

It was created for the 1973 local elections, and contained the wards of Ballyhalbert, Carrowdore, Donaghadee North, Donaghadee South, Greyabbey, Kircubbin and Portaferry. It was abolished for the 1985 local elections and replaced by the Ards Peninsula DEA.

== Councillors ==
Election	Councillor (Party)	Councillor (Party)	Councillor (Party)	Councillor (Party)	Councillor (Party)	Councillor (Party)	Councillor (Party)
1981	John Scott (UUP)	Robert Ambrose (UUP)	Oliver Johnston (DUP)	Joseph Thompson (DUP)	Gladys McIntyre (UPUP)	William Sheldon (Alliance)	Patrick Doherty (SDLP)
1977	John Scott (UUP)	Robert Ambrose (UUP)	William Caughey (UUP)	Joseph Thompson (DUP)	Charles Dunleath (Alliance)	William Sheldon (Alliance)	Patrick Doherty (SDLP)
1973	John Scott (UUP)	Henry Cosbey (UUP)	Oliver Johnston (UUP)	T. G. H. Pollock (UUP)	J. Donnan (UUP)	G. McMordie (UUP)	J. B. McPolin (SDLP)

== 1981 Election ==
1977: 3 x UUP, 2 x Alliance, 1 x DUP, 1 x SDLP

1981: 2 x DUP, 2 x UUP, 1 x UPUP, 1 x SDLP, 1 x Alliance

1977-1981 Change: DUP and UPUP gain from UUP and Alliance

Ards Area A - 7 seats
Party	Candidate	FPv%	Count									
Party	Candidate	FPv%	1	2	3	4	5	6	7	8	9	10
UPUP	Gladys McIntyre	13.04%	1,034									
UUP	Robert Ambrose*	7.68%	609	610	627.04	653.64	692.04	747.52	758.64	1,021.64		
SDLP	Patrick Doherty*	11.88%	942	942.04	942.04	943.12	943.12	943.12	961.16	965.2	1,347.2	
DUP	Joseph Thompson*	11.57%	917	918.32	923.44	950.76	954.8	960.92	960.92	974.16	976.24	981.24
Alliance	William Sheldon*	5.39%	427	427.44	436.44	439.64	448.68	453.8	730.44	764.76	820.84	974.84
DUP	Oliver Johnston	11.04%	875	876.68	882.84	890.68	901.92	920.16	923.2	952.72	954.72	958.72
UUP	John Scott*	6.88%	545	548.48	576.72	592.08	633.6	758.12	790.32	878.6	882.84	886.84
DUP	Jim Shannon	9.35%	741	743.04	744.08	754.52	760.56	763.68	768.72	796.92	798.08	807.08
Independent	James McMullan	6.07%	481	481.64	484.64	486.68	486.68	488.68	492.68	495.72		
UUP	William Caughey*	4.28%	339	339.72	346.84	358.12	420.56	483.28	491.4			
Alliance	Alan Burnside	4.25%	337	337.36	341.36	346.16	348.2	367.36				
UUP	James Kennett	3.27%	259	260	271.08	278.6	307.92					
UUP	David Hamilton	2.64%	209	209.8	210.96	215.36						
UPUP	Frances Millar	1.26%	100	125.48	140.96							
Unionist Party NI	Michael Long	1.41%	112	113.52								
Electorate: 14,228 Valid: 7,927 (55.71%) Spoilt: 235 Quota: 991 Turnout: 8,162 (57.37%)

== 1977 Election ==
1973: 6 x UUP, 1 x SDLP

1977: 3 x UUP, 2 x Alliance, 1 x DUP, 1 x SDLP

1973-1977 Change: Alliance (two seats) and DUP gain from UUP (three seats)

Ards Area A - 7 seats
Party	Candidate	FPv%	Count											
Party	Candidate	FPv%	1	2	3	4	5	6	7	8	9	10	11	12
Alliance	Charles Dunleath	20.39%	1,339											
DUP	Joseph Thompson*	14.94%	981											
SDLP	Patrick Doherty*	14.68%	964											
Alliance	William Sheldon	2.89%	190	568.8	571.86	600.93	601.93	607.61	612.61	629.49	636.46	796.17	896.17	
UUP	John Scott*	6.79%	446	453.6	467.71	468.22	471.41	480.36	491.1	500.27	672.78	674.29	823.29	
UUP	William Caughey	6.87%	451	471.8	487.61	487.95	489.66	507.16	561.82	567.52	630.82	632.62	692.58	706.58
UUP	Robert Ambrose	4.37%	287	294.6	320.1	320.61	335.46	373.95	437.32	535.52	565.02	575.44	626.94	647.94
UUP	Oliver Johnston*	7.01%	460	466.4	475.41	475.92	477.09	480.28	493.12	497.8	529.42	531.42	566.01	578.01
Unionist Party NI	Michael Long	5.65%	371	401.4	406.67	407.69	408.09	411.77	421.11	451.85	477.96	499.54		
Independent	James McMullan	4.77%	313	343.8	343.97	446.14	446.14	447.71	449.91	453.1	454.27			
UUP	Henry Cosbey*	4.69%	308	316	325.69	326.03	327.2	333.61	343.69	346.77				
Independent	Francis McMaster	1.95%	128	133.2	142.72	144.76	175.45	207.96	218.98					
UUP	William Keag	2.41%	158	166	172.97	173.99	179.84	193.41						
Ind. Unionist	Robert Mason	1.55%	102	108.4	150.56	150.73	169.78							
Ind. Unionist	Vera Shaw	1.04%	68	71.2	83.1	83.1								
Electorate: 13,817 Valid: 6,566 (47.52%) Spoilt: 227 Quota: 821 Turnout: 6,793 (49.16%)

== 1973 Election ==
1973: 6 x UUP, 1 x SDLP

Ards Area A - 7 seats
Party	Candidate	FPv%	Count								
Party	Candidate	FPv%	1	2	3	4	5	6	7	8	9
SDLP	J. B. McPolin	14.68%	1,101								
UUP	Henry Cosbey	12.81%	961								
UUP	John Scott	11.27%	845	845	847.17	854.17	879.51	1,029.51			
UUP	J. Donnan	12.07%	905	906.87	910.55	925.55	937.89	1,020.89			
UUP	T. G. H. Pollock	11.64%	873	873.17	873.51	891.51	904.51	990.51			
UUP	Oliver Johnston	9.59%	719	719.17	722.17	730.34	742.34	814.34	870.58	915.58	944.83
UUP	G. McMordie	10.05%	754	755.02	757.02	760.19	778.7	836.7	871.48	891.48	914.73
Alliance	C. McNamara	4.20%	315	416.49	451.74	510.8	817.24	823.92	823.92	824.92	824.92
Vanguard	R. H. Willis	6.37%	478	478.68	484.19	940.36	492.36				
Alliance	M. Leroux	3.52%	264	268.25	278.25	403.35					
Alliance	William Sheldon	3.07%	230	234.59	249.67						
NI Labour	J. M. Paden	0.73%	55	100.22							
Electorate: 13,393 Valid: 7,500 (56.00%) Spoilt: 92 Quota: 938 Turnout: 7,592 (56.69%)
