= Ards Area C =

District electoral areas in Ards, Northern Ireland

Ards Area C was one of the three district electoral areas in Ards, Northern Ireland which existed from 1973 to 1985. The district elected four members to Ards Borough Council, and formed part of the North Down constituencies for the Northern Ireland Assembly and UK Parliament.

It was created for the 1973 local elections, and contained the wards of Ballygowan, Comber North, Comber South and Killinchy. It was abolished for the 1985 local elections and replaced by the Ards West DEA.

== Councillors ==
Election	Councillor (Party)	Councillor (Party)	Councillor (Party)	Councillor (Party)
1981	Hamilton McKeag (UUP)	Thomas Gourley (DUP)	John Hamilton (DUP)	Jim McBriar (Alliance)
1977	Hamilton McKeag (UUP)	Thomas Gourley (DUP)	John Shields (Independent Unionist)	Jim McBriar (Alliance)
1973	Hamilton McKeag (UUP)	D. Hamilton (UUP)	James Caughey (Independent Unionist)	Jim McBriar (Alliance)

== 1981 Election ==
1977: 1 x UUP, 1 x Alliance, 1 x DUP, 1 x Independent Unionist

1981: 2 x DUP, 1 x UUP, 1 x Alliance

1977-1981 Change: DUP gain from Independent Unionist

Ards Area C - 4 seats
Party	Candidate	FPv%	Count									
Party	Candidate	FPv%	1	2	3	4	5	6	7	8	9	10
DUP	Thomas Gourley*	26.19%	1,479									
UUP	Hamilton McKeag*	19.16%	1,082	1,099.02	1,111.71	1,201.71						
DUP	John Hamilton	13.31%	752	1,041.8	1,057.72	1,082.41	1,087.33	1,112.61	1,187.61			
Alliance	Jim McBriar*	9.31%	526	528.76	535.22	541.22	547.78	559.01	598.88	902.72	908.72	1,113.72
UUP	Gordon Brown	5.91%	334	339.52	356.75	416.05	466.89	481.12	551.78	571.78	595.78	753.78
Ind. Unionist	John Shields*	5.51%	311	314.68	317.68	325.14	327.6	499.62	540.9	570.59	584.59	
Alliance	Kathleen Coulter	6.16%	348	350.53	353.53	362.53	362.53	377.53	388.99			
UPUP	Robert McKee	3.93%	222	226.14	294.6	303.52	307.62	317.62				
Independent	James Middleton	4.20%	237	240.22	247.22	255.45	257.91					
UUP	James Caughey	3.77%	213	217.83	224.83							
UPUP	Shirley McWhinney	2.20%	124	126.07								
Independent	Thomas Adair	0.35%	20	20.69								
Electorate: 9,936 Valid: 5,648 (56.84%) Spoilt: 168 Quota: 1,130 Turnout: 5,816 (58.53%)

== 1977 Election ==
1973: 2 x UUP, 1 x Alliance, 1 x Independent Unionist

1977: 1 x UUP, 1 x Alliance, 1 x DUP, 1 x Independent Unionist

1973-1977 Change: DUP gain from UUP

Ards Area C - 4 seats
Party	Candidate	FPv%	Count								
Party	Candidate	FPv%	1	2	3	4	5	6	7	8	9
UUP	Hamilton McKeag*	19.16%	823	842	869						
Ind. Unionist	John Shields	12.11%	520	542	552	558	585	639	1,049		
Alliance	Jim McBriar*	10.43%	448	451	452	687	706	779	824	917.84	
DUP	Thomas Gourley	13.06%	561	578	701	701	716	747	768	796.56	804.96
UUP	Harold Porter	8.10%	348	350	352	356	540	611	681	744.92	793.92
Independent	James Middleton	9.73%	418	434	442	452	482	584			
Ind. Unionist	James Caughey*	8.20%	352	359	363	365	379				
UUP	Adela Hamilton	6.57%	282	284	291	292					
Alliance	Alice Rudnitzky	6.08%	261	264	265						
UUUP	William Dempster	3.77%	170	187							
Independent	Arthur Spence	2.61%	112								
Electorate: 9,514 Valid: 4,295 (45.14%) Spoilt: 120 Quota: 860 Turnout: 4,415 (46.41%)

== 1973 Election ==
1973: 2 x UUP, 1 x Alliance, 1 x Independent Unionist

Ards Area C - 4 seats
Party	Candidate	FPv%	Count						
Party	Candidate	FPv%	1	2	3	4	5	6	7
UUP	D. Hamilton	11.69%	645	653	669	973	1,249		
UUP	Hamilton McKeag	13.18%	727	740	777	881	1,201		
Alliance	Jim McBriar	12.36%	682	1,003	1,011	1,037	1,068	1,105.4	
Ind. Unionist	James Caughey	16.23%	895	920	939	969	1,004	1,065.2	1,123.85
Vanguard	W. Crawford	10.75%	593	594	936	953	977	1,022.9	1,060.64
UUP	Harold Porter	10.55%	582	595	605	692			
UUP	J. H. Cromie	10.12%	558	561	572				
Vanguard	D. McCreery	7.96%	439	445					
Alliance	Alice Rudnitzky	7.16%	395						
Electorate: 8,762 Valid: 5,516 (62.95%) Spoilt: 83 Quota: 1,104 Turnout: 5,599 (63.90%)
