= Ards Area B =

District electoral areas in Ards, Northern Ireland

Ards Area B was one of the three district electoral areas in Ards, Northern Ireland which existed from 1973 to 1985. The district elected six members to Ards Borough Council, and formed part of the North Down constituencies for the Northern Ireland Assembly and UK Parliament.

It was created for the 1973 local elections, and contained the wards of Central, Glen, Loughries, Movilla, Scrabo and Ulsterville. It was abolished for the 1985 local elections and replaced by the Newtownards DEA.

== Councillors ==
Election	Councillor (Party)	Councillor (Party)	Councillor (Party)	Councillor (Party)	Councillor (Party)	Councillor (Party)
1981	Hugh Boyd (DUP)	John Elliott (DUP)	Simpson Gibson (DUP)	Robert Brown (UPUP)	Owen Dorrian (Alliance)	Robert Gaw (NILP)
1977	Hugh Boyd (DUP)	John Algie (UUP)	William Boal (UUP)	Herbert Gallagher (Alliance)	Owen Dorrian (Alliance)	Robert Gaw (NILP)
1973	Cecilia Cooke (UUP)	John Algie (UUP)	William Spratt (UUP)	Robert Brown (Loyalist Coalition)	Owen Dorrian (Alliance)	Robert Gaw (NILP)

== 1981 Election ==
1977: 2 x UUP, 2 x Alliance, 1 x NILP, 1 x DUP

1981: 3 x DUP, 1 x NILP, 1 x UPUP, 1 x Alliance

1977-1981 Change: DUP (two seats) and UPUP gain from UUP (two seats) and Alliance

Ards Area B - 7 seats
Party	Candidate	FPv%	Count									
Party	Candidate	FPv%	1	2	3	4	5	6	7	8	9	10
DUP	Hugh Boyd*	20.16%	1,681									
NI Labour	Robert Gaw*	15.71%	1,310									
DUP	John Elliott	8.03%	670	1,036.27	1,044.46	1,066.06	1,070.82	1,084.82	1,093.18	1,113.92	1,141.51	1,182.71
DUP	Simpson Gibson	12.05%	1,005	1,067.06	1,071.02	1,083.75	1,086.93	1,100.93	1,105.93	1,125.96	1,138.81	1,167.29
Alliance	Owen Dorrian*	9.41%	784	786.61	803.89	835.65	838.65	841.19	1,059.78	1,086.68	1,108.78	1,154.96
UPUP	Robert Brown	6.09%	508	538.16	545.72	552.61	559.17	566.46	575.73	686.73	724.76	1,136.69
UUP	Hugh Patton	4.59%	383	387.35	392.57	396.65	485.84	558.85	570.57	599.14	1,004.54	1,078.36
UPUP	James Murray	5.61%	468	471.77	478.61	486.76	493.85	499.12	505.84	660.55	686.21	
UUP	Robert Hamilton	5.49%	458	465.54	469.68	475.02	502.29	558.03	569.21	593.6		
UPUP	Hugh Yeaman	4.32%	360	362.9	368.03	374.92	379.3	388.93	397.58			
Alliance	James Murphy	3.24%	270	270.29	273.53	286.5	289.59	294.86				
UUP	Edward McLoughlin	1.99%	166	166.87	169.03	174.66	192.2					
UUP	William Speers	1.94%	162	163.45	165.7	168.51						
NI Labour	John Gray	1.37%	114	115.16	164.12							
Electorate: 16,070 Valid: 8,339 (51.89%) Spoilt: 310 Quota: 1,192 Turnout: 8,649 (53.82%)

== 1977 Election ==
1973: 3 x UUP, 1 x Alliance, 1 x NILP, 1 x Loyalist

1977: 2 x UUP, 2 x Alliance, 1 x NILP, 1 x DUP

1973-1977 Change: Alliance and DUP gain from UUP and Loyalist

Ards Area B - 7 seats
Party	Candidate	FPv%	Count					
Party	Candidate	FPv%	1	2	3	4	5	6
NI Labour	Robert Gaw*	14.06%	843	874				
DUP	Hugh Boyd	13.01%	780	868				
UUP	John Algie*	13.71%	822	861				
UUP	William Boal	6.36%	381	415	418.5	512.5	774.5	852.2
Alliance	Herbert Gallagher	10.94%	656	667	669.8	685.8	720.8	813.5
Alliance	Owen Dorrian*	10.23%	613	621	621	626	638.7	802.4
Unionist Party NI	Cecilia Cooke*	8.59%	515	536	537.4	562.4	649.1	733.5
NI Labour	William Allen	8.44%	506	515	520.6	541.3	567.3	
UUP	Hugh Yeaman	5.24%	314	323	325.1	457.8		
UUP	William Spratt*	4.80%	288	302	303.4			
Vanguard	Robert Brown*	4.62%	277					
Electorate: 15,342 Valid: 5,995 (39.08%) Spoilt: 232 Quota: 857 Turnout: 6,227 (40.59%)

== 1973 Election ==
1973: 3 x UUP, 1 x Alliance, 1 x NILP, 1 x Loyalist Coalition

Ards Area B - 7 seats
Party	Candidate	FPv%	Count													
Party	Candidate	FPv%	1	2	3	4	5	6	7	8	9	10	11	12	13	14
UUP	John Algie	19.38%	1,568													
UUP	Cecilia Cooke	11.79%	954	1,120.14	1,120.14	1,130.14	1,146.92	1,228.92								
Alliance	Owen Dorrian	8.26%	668	671.9	719.9	755.9	830.42	835.68	836.59	1,207.59						
UUP	William Spratt	8.80%	712	777.26	777.26	791.26	793.26	949.34	986.65	1,005.69	1,016.89	1,039.62	1,328.62			
Loyalist Coalition	Robert Brown	6.90%	558	573.86	573.86	580.86	581.38	587.9	589.72	593.72	593.88	961.9	1,009.53	1,044.53	1,605.53	
NI Labour	Robert Gaw	7.00%	566	584.46	591.46	630.46	648.72	652.72	652.72	687.93	702.33	712.43	789.12	815.12	858.26	934.26
NI Labour	William Allen	6.09%	493	515.62	522.62	550.88	556.88	562.88	562.88	583.79	593.55	608.75	670.86	699.86	729.73	784.73
Loyalist Coalition	William Hannigan	6.64%	537	541.94	542.2	543.2	546.2	550.72	552.54	554.54	555.98	642.28	674.99	697.99		
UUP	Georgina Foulis	4.59%	371	430.54	430.54	443.8	449.06	512.7	539.09	560.39	570.31	607.3				
DUP	Irene Brown	6.34%	513	533.54	534.54	537.54	540.54	545.54	547.36	550.88	552.64					
Alliance	W. H. Forsythe	4.19%	339	343.68	344.68	354.68	477.68	481.68	484.41							
UUP	H. McGimpsey	4.02%	325	344.76	344.76	349.28	351.28									
Alliance	G. Hirst	2.97%	240	242.34	242.34	254.34										
Ulster Liberal	Albert McElroy	2.06%	167	168.04	182.04											
SDLP	D. G. C. Devaney	0.98%	79	79.26												
Electorate: 13,801 Valid: 8,090 (58.62%) Spoilt: 127 Quota: 1,156 Turnout: 8,217 (59.54%)
