= Michelle Guy =

Northern Irish politician

Michelle Guy MLA
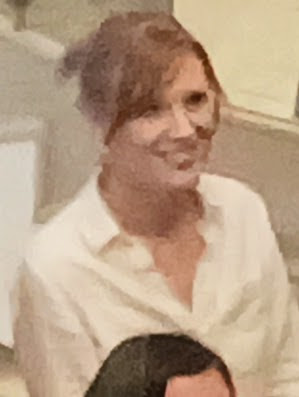

Alliance Party portfolios
- 2024–present: Party Chair
- 2024–present: Education spokesperson

Member of the Legislative Assembly for Lagan Valley
- Incumbent
- Assumed office 9 July 2024
- Preceded by: Sorcha Eastwood

Deputy Mayor of Lisburn and Castlereagh
- In office 7 June 2022 – 8 June 2023
- Mayor: Scott Carson
- Preceded by: Tim Mitchell
- Succeeded by: Gary McCleave

Member of Lisburn and Castlereagh City Council
- In office 2 May 2019 – 9 July 2024
- Preceded by: Geraldine Rice
- Succeeded by: Jamie Harpur
- Constituency: Castlereagh South

Personal details
- Born: Teconnaught, County Down, Northern Ireland
- Party: Alliance Party (since 2015)
- Other political affiliations: Northern Ireland Women's Coalition (before 2006)
- Spouse: Chris Guy
- Children: 2
- Education: Queen's University Belfast

Michelle Guy (née Davey) is an Alliance Party politician who has been a Member of the Legislative Assembly (MLA) for Lagan Valley since July 2024, as well as a member of the Alliance Party Executive, currently serving as Chair.

== Early life ==
Guy comes from Teconnaught in County Down and went to Assumption Grammar School.

She graduated with a law degree from Queen's University Belfast but decided not to pursue a legal career. Guy did a postgraduate course in marketing and secured a work placement with Newry-based financial technology company First Derivatives. She has also worked for several other small Northern Irish technology firms.

== Political career ==
Guy was elected to Lisburn and Castlereagh City Council in 2019, representing the Castlereagh South District. During her term, she served as Deputy Mayor in 2022. She was re-elected as a councillor in 2023.

At the 2024 general election, she contested the Strangford constituency, where she finished second against Jim Shannon of the Democratic Unionist Party (DUP), receiving 10,428 votes (26.8%).

=== Member of the Northern Ireland Assembly ===
However, following Sorcha Eastwood's election as Lagan Valley's MP, Guy applied for the now-vacant MLA seat in the Lagan Valley constituency. On July 10, the party announced her as the new MLA.

Guy's first attendance to the chamber was in supporting the Opposition to Racism motion following far-right rioting in Belfast in August 2024.

In her capacity as the Alliance's education spokesperson, Guy voiced concerns regarding the Education Minister's decision to allocate £250,000 for magnetic lockable phone pouches in schools in September 2024. She welcomed the guidance on mobile phone use but criticised the expenditure amid financial constraints in the education sector, stating, "I find it difficult to believe this is the most appropriate use of the department's limited budget."

As a member of the Education Committee, Guy raised her concerns about a controversial meeting between the Education Minister and the Loyalist Communities Council (LCC) in September 2024. She expressed her concern about the legitimacy of the LCC as a stakeholder in educational discussions, remarking, "It was disturbing to see it... not credible for the Minister to be standing against paramilitary exploitation of children then meeting with LCC."

== Personal life ==
Guy lives just outside Drumbo with her husband Chris and their two children, Caitlin and Daniel. Chris Guy works in corporate law.

She is a supporter of Manchester United F.C. and enjoys walking in the Mourne Mountains.

Guy was diagnosed with cervical cancer in November 2023.

Northern Ireland Assembly
Preceded by Sorcha Eastwood	Member of the Legislative Assembly for Lagan Valley; 2024–present	Incumbent
