= 1977 Ards Borough Council election =

Local government election in Northern Ireland

← 1973	18 May 1977	1981 →

All 17 seats to Ards Borough Council 9 seats needed for a majority
	First party	Second party	Third party
Party	UUP	Alliance	DUP
Seats won	6	5	3
Seat change	▼5	▲3	▲3
	Fourth party	Fifth party	Sixth party
Party	NI Labour	SDLP	Ind. Unionist
Seats won	1	1	1
Seat change	0	0	0
	Seventh party
Party	Loyalist Coalition
Seats won	0
Seat change	▼1

Elections to Ards Borough Council were held on 18 May 1977 on the same day as the other Northern Irish local government elections. The election used three district electoral areas to elect a total of 17 councillors.

== Election results ==
Ards Borough Council Election Result 1977
Party	Seats	Gains	Losses	Net gain/loss	Seats %	Votes %	Votes	+/−
UUP	6	0	5	▼5	35.3	31.8	5,368	▼22.7
Alliance	5	3	0	▲3	29.4	20.8	3,507	▲6.0
DUP	3	3	0	▲3	17.6	13.8	2,322	New
NI Labour	1	0	0	0	5.9	8.0	1,349	▲2.7
Ind. Unionist	1	1	1	0	0.0	6.2	1,042	▲2.0
SDLP	1	0	0	0	5.9	5.7	964	▲0.1
Independent	0	0	0	0	0.0	5.8	971	▲5.8
Unionist Party NI	0	0	0	0	0.0	5.3	886	New
Vanguard	0	0	0	0	0.0	1.6	277	▼5.6
UUUP	0	0	0	0	0.0	1.0	170	New

Note: "Votes" are the first preference votes.

== Districts summary ==
Results of the Ards Borough Council election, 1977 by district
Ward	%	Cllrs	%	Cllrs	%	Cllrs	%	Cllrs	%	Cllrs	%	Cllrs	Total Cllrs
Ward	UUP		Alliance		DUP		NILP		SDLP		Others		Total Cllrs
Area A	32.1	3	23.3	2	12.5	1	0.0	0	14.7	1	17.4	0	7
Area B	30.1	2	21.2	2	13.0	1	22.5	1	0.0	0	13.2	0	6
Area C	33.8	1	16.5	1	13.1	1	0.0	0	0.0	0	36.6	1	4
Total	31.8	6	20.8	5	13.8	3	8.0	1	5.7	1	19.9	1	17

== Districts results ==
=== Area A ===
1973: 6 x UUP, 1 x SDLP
1977: 3 x UUP, 2 x Alliance, 1 x DUP, 1 x SDLP
1973-1977 Change: Alliance (two seats) and DUP gain from UUP (three seats)

Ards Area A - 7 seats
Party	Candidate	FPv%	Count											
Party	Candidate	FPv%	1	2	3	4	5	6	7	8	9	10	11	12
Alliance	Charles Dunleath	20.39%	1,339											
DUP	Joseph Thompson*	14.94%	981											
SDLP	Patrick Doherty*	14.68%	964											
Alliance	William Sheldon	2.89%	190	568.8	571.86	600.93	601.93	607.61	612.61	629.49	636.46	796.17	896.17	
UUP	John Scott*	6.79%	446	453.6	467.71	468.22	471.41	480.36	491.1	500.27	672.78	674.29	823.29	
UUP	William Caughey	6.87%	451	471.8	487.61	487.95	489.66	507.16	561.82	567.52	630.82	632.62	692.58	706.58
UUP	Robert Ambrose	4.37%	287	294.6	320.1	320.61	335.46	373.95	437.32	535.52	565.02	575.44	626.94	647.94
UUP	Oliver Johnston*	7.01%	460	466.4	475.41	475.92	477.09	480.28	493.12	497.8	529.42	531.42	566.01	578.01
Unionist Party NI	Michael Long	5.65%	371	401.4	406.67	407.69	408.09	411.77	421.11	451.85	477.96	499.54		
Independent	James McMullan	4.77%	313	343.8	343.97	446.14	446.14	447.71	449.91	453.1	454.27			
UUP	Henry Cosbey*	4.69%	308	316	325.69	326.03	327.2	333.61	343.69	346.77				
Independent	Francis McMaster	1.95%	128	133.2	142.72	144.76	175.45	207.96	218.98					
UUP	William Keag	2.41%	158	166	172.97	173.99	179.84	193.41						
Ind. Unionist	Robert Mason	1.55%	102	108.4	150.56	150.73	169.78							
Ind. Unionist	Vera Shaw	1.04%	68	71.2	83.1	83.1								
Electorate: 13,817 Valid: 6,566 (47.52%) Spoilt: 227 Quota: 821 Turnout: 6,793 (49.16%)

=== Area B ===
1973: 3 x UUP, 1 x Alliance, 1 x NILP, 1 x Loyalist
1977: 2 x UUP, 2 x Alliance, 1 x NILP, 1 x DUP
1973-1977 Change: Alliance and DUP gain from UUP and Loyalist

Ards Area B - 6 seats
Party	Candidate	FPv%	Count					
Party	Candidate	FPv%	1	2	3	4	5	6
NI Labour	Robert Gaw*	14.06%	843	874				
DUP	Hugh Boyd	13.01%	780	868				
UUP	John Algie*	13.71%	822	861				
UUP	William Boal	6.36%	381	415	418.5	512.5	774.5	852.2
Alliance	Herbert Gallagher	10.94%	656	667	669.8	685.8	720.8	813.5
Alliance	Owen Dorrian*	10.23%	613	621	621	626	638.7	802.4
Unionist Party NI	Cecilia Cooke*	8.59%	515	536	537.4	562.4	649.1	733.5
NI Labour	William Allen	8.44%	506	515	520.6	541.3	567.3	
UUP	Hugh Yeaman	5.24%	314	323	325.1	457.8		
UUP	William Spratt	4.80%	288	302	303.4			
Vanguard	Robert Brown*	4.62%	277					
Electorate: 15,342 Valid: 5,995 (39.08%) Spoilt: 232 Quota: 857 Turnout: 6,227 (40.59%)

=== Area C ===
1973: 2 x UUP, 1 x Alliance, 1 x Independent Unionist
1977: 1 x UUP, 1 x Alliance, 1 x DUP, 1 x Independent Unionist
1973-1977 Change: DUP gain from UUP

Ards Area C - 4 seats
Party	Candidate	FPv%	Count								
Party	Candidate	FPv%	1	2	3	4	5	6	7	8	9
UUP	Hamilton McKeag*	19.16%	823	842	869						
Ind. Unionist	John Shields	12.11%	520	542	552	558	585	639	1,049		
Alliance	Jim McBriar*	10.43%	448	451	452	687	706	779	824	917.84	
DUP	Thomas Gourley	13.06%	561	578	701	701	716	747	768	796.56	804.96
UUP	Harold Porter	8.10%	348	350	352	356	540	611	681	744.92	793.92
Independent	James Middleton	9.73%	418	434	442	452	482	584			
Ind. Unionist	James Caughey*	8.20%	352	359	363	365	379				
UUP	Adela Hamilton	6.57%	282	284	291	292					
Alliance	Alice Rudnitzky	6.08%	261	264	265						
UUUP	William Dempster	3.77%	170	187							
Independent	Arthur Spence	2.61%	112								
Electorate: 9,514 Valid: 4,295 (45.14%) Spoilt: 120 Quota: 860 Turnout: 4,415 (46.41%)
