= 2023 Lisburn and Castlereagh City Council election =

Northern Ireland local election

- 18 May 2023

All 40 council seats 21 seats needed for a majority
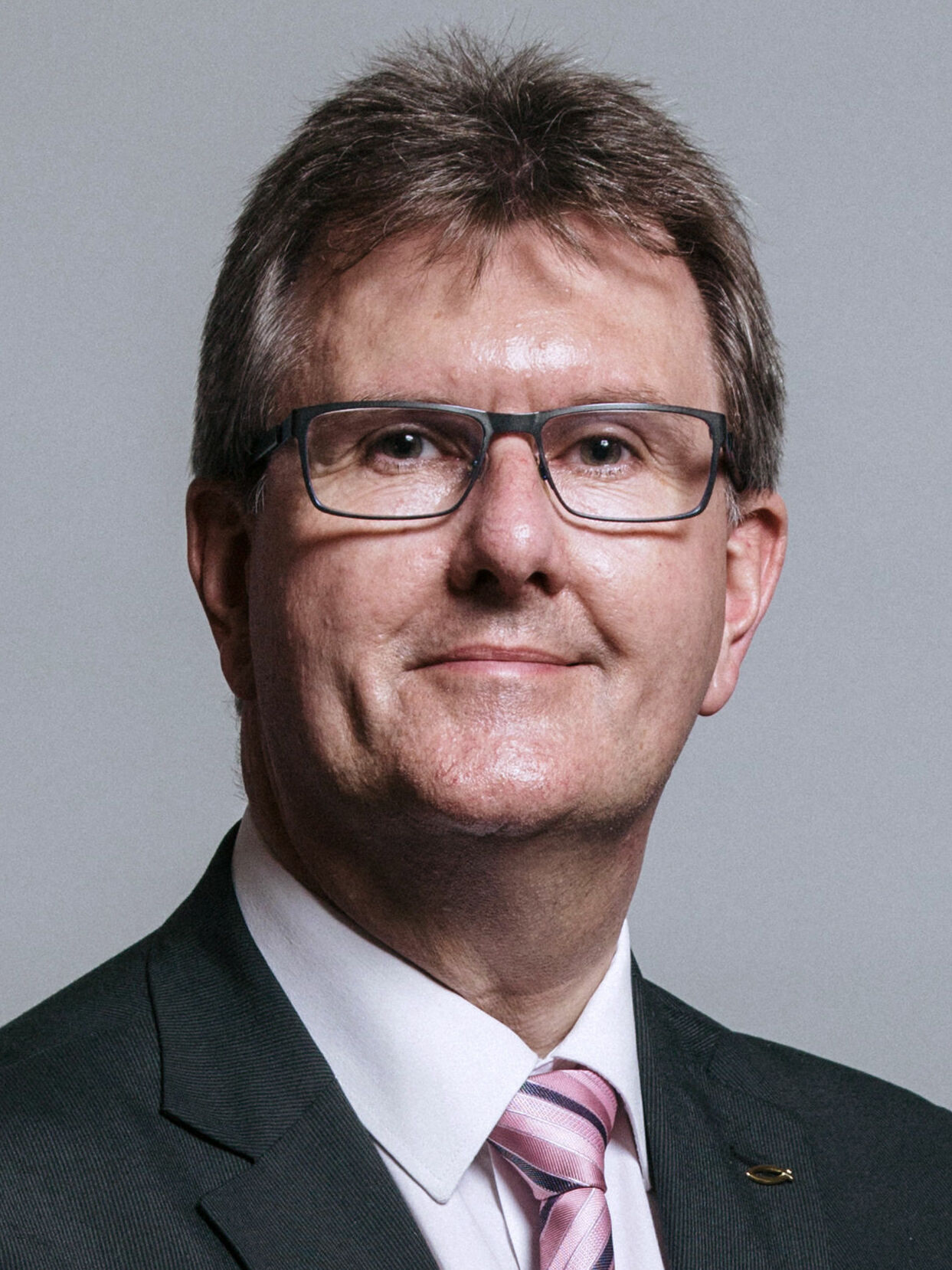

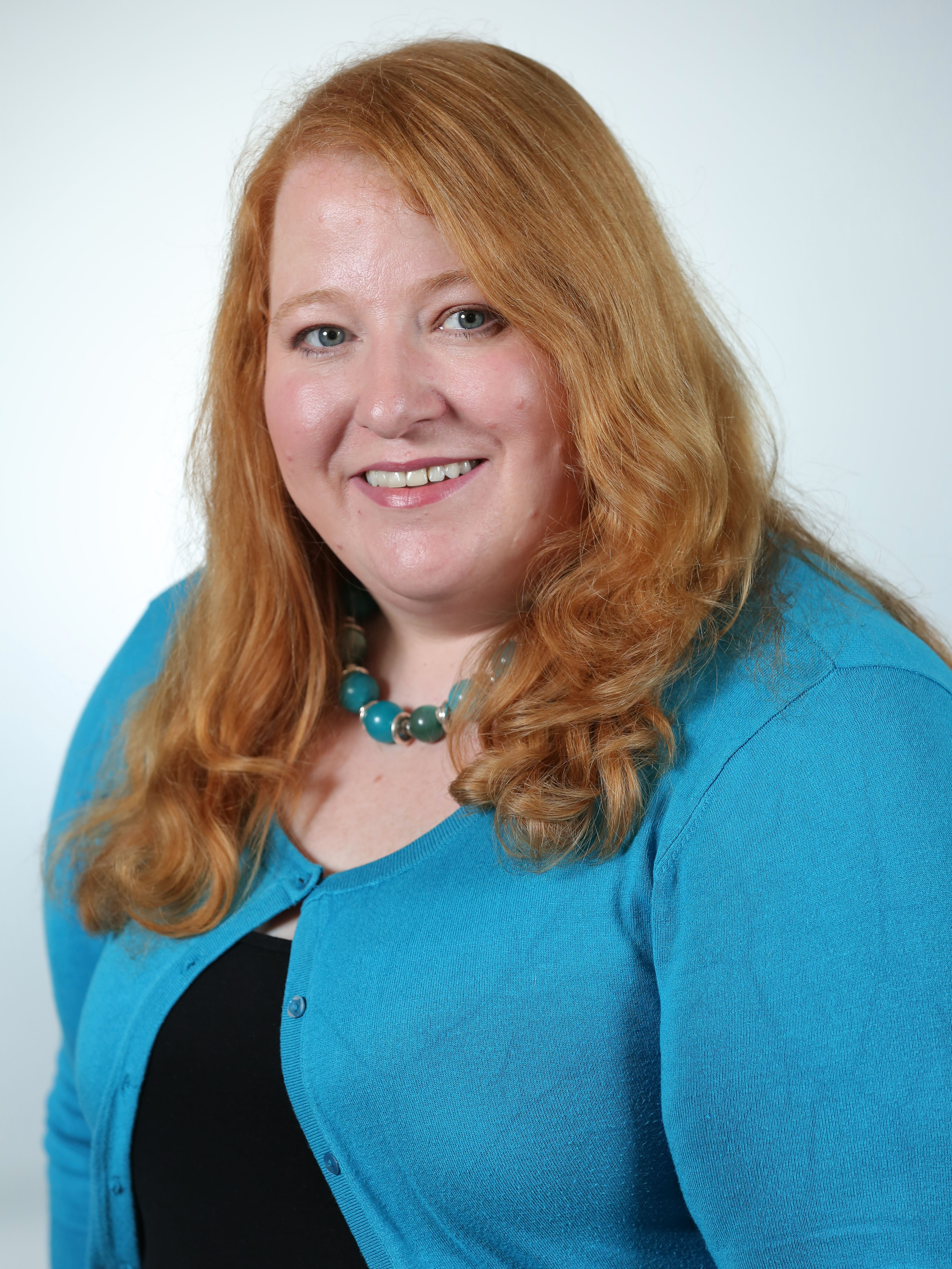

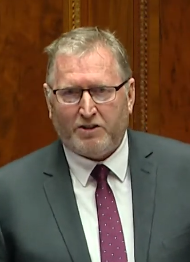

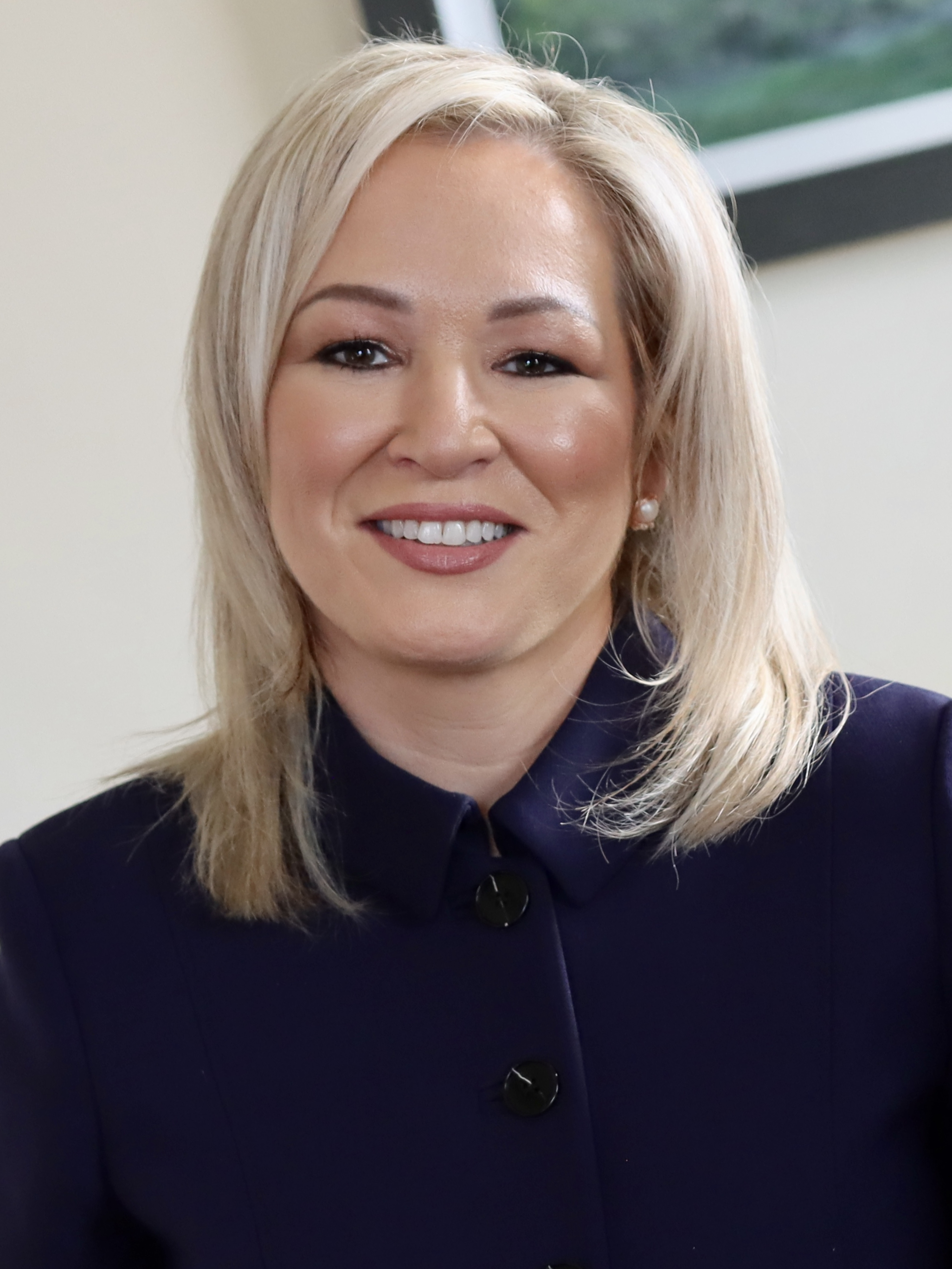

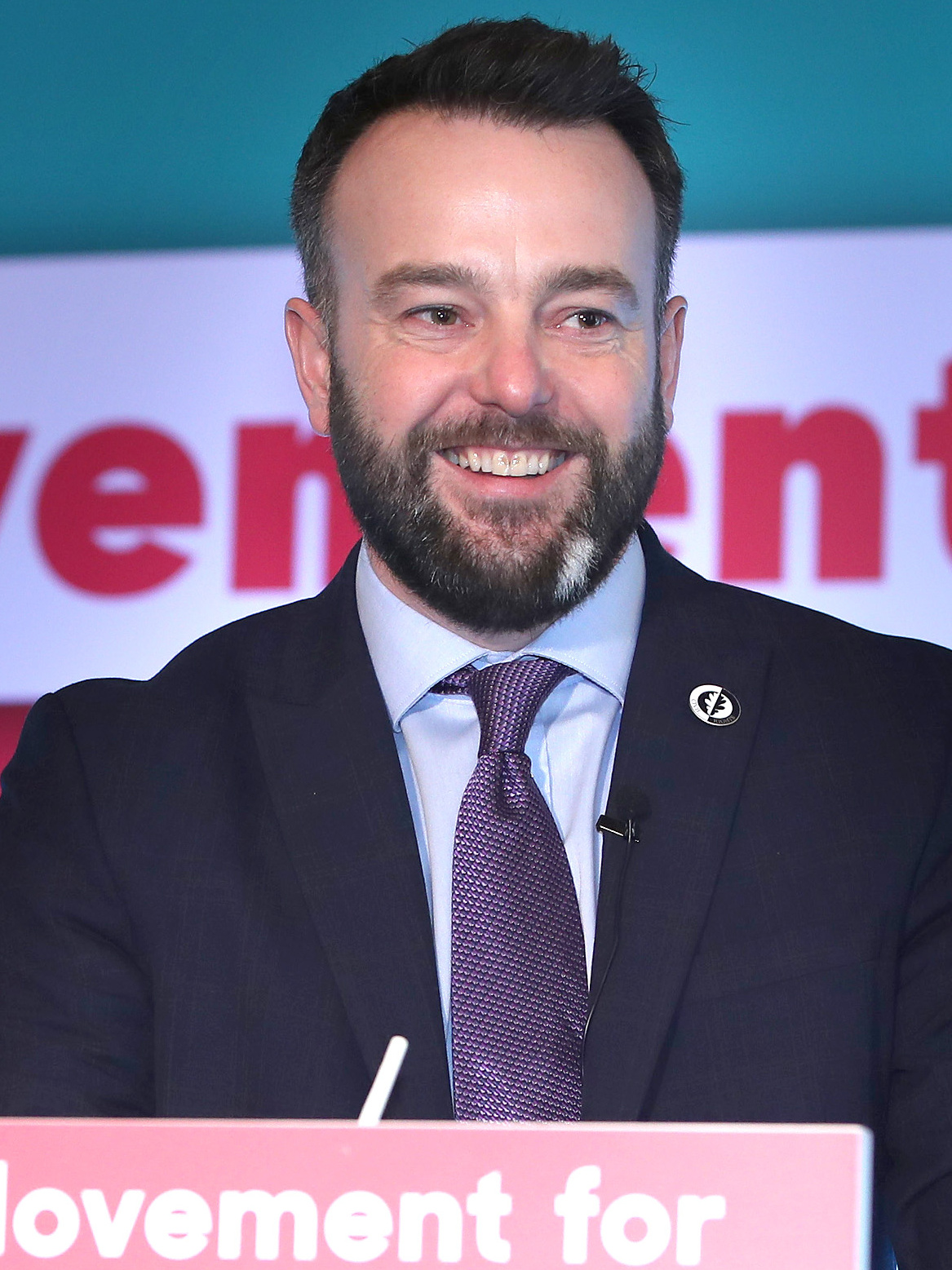
| | First party | Second party | Third party |
|---|---|---|---|
| Leader | Jeffrey Donaldson | Naomi Long | Doug Beattie |
| Party | DUP | Alliance | UUP |
| Last election | 15 | 9 | 11 |
| Seats won | 14 | 13 | 6 |
| Seat change | ▼1 | ▲4 | ▼5 |
| Popular vote | 19,187 | 16,064 | 7,877 |
| Percentage | 34.0% | 28.5% | 14.0% |
| Swing | ▼2.7% | ▲4.9% | ▼3.6% |
| | Fourth party | Fifth party | Sixth party |
| Leader | Michelle O'Neill (Note: The leader of Sinn Féin is Mary Lou McDonald, who sits as a TD in the Irish Dáil Éireann for Dublin Central. O'Neill is the leader of the party in Northern Ireland.) | Colum Eastwood |
| Party | Sinn Féin | SDLP | Independent |
| Last election | 2 | 2 | 0 |
| Seats won | 4 | 2 | 1 |
| Seat change | ▲2 | 0 | ▲1 |
| Popular vote | 6,193 | 3,774 | 1,017 |
| Percentage | 11.0% | 6.7% | 1.8% |
| Swing | ▲5.6% | ▼2.0% | ▲0.1% |
- Lisburn and Castlereagh 2023 Council Election Results by DEA (Shaded by plurality of FPVs)
Council control before election
No overall control
Council control after election
No overall control

The 2023 election to Lisburn and Castlereagh City Council was held on 18 May 2023, alongside other local elections in Northern Ireland, two weeks after local elections in England. The Northern Ireland elections were delayed by 2 weeks to avoid overlapping with the coronation of King Charles III.

The election returned 40 members to the council via Single Transferable Vote. This consisted of 14 Democratic Unionist Party members (who topped the polls in three districts: Castlereagh East, Downshire East and Lisburn South), 13 Alliance Party members (who topped the polls in two districts: Castlereagh South and Downshire West), 6 Ulster Unionist Party members, 4 Sinn Féin members (who topped the polls in two districts: Killultagh and Lisburn North), 2 Social Democratic and Labour Party members and 1 Independent member.

== Election results ==
2023 Lisburn and Castlereagh City Council election result
| Party | Seats | Gains | Losses | Net gain/loss | Seats % | Votes % | Votes | +/− |
|---|---|---|---|---|---|---|---|---|
| DUP | 14 | 0 | 1 | ▼1 | 35.00 | 34.02 | 19,187 | ▼2.69 |
| Alliance | 13 | 4 | 0 | ▲4 | 32.50 | 28.48 | 16,064 | ▲4.84 |
| UUP | 6 | 0 | 5 | ▼5 | 15.00 | 13.97 | 7,877 | ▼3.61 |
| Sinn Féin | 4 | 2 | 0 | ▲2 | 10.00 | 10.98 | 6,193 | ▲5.57 |
| SDLP | 2 | 0 | 0 | 0 | 5.00 | 6.69 | 3,774 | ▼1.99 |
| Independent | 1 | 1 | 0 | ▲1 | 2.50 | 1.80 | 1,017 | ▲0.05 |
| TUV | 0 | 0 | 0 | 0 | 0.00 | 2.33 | 1,317 | ▲0.01 |
| Green (NI) | 0 | 0 | 1 | ▼1 | 0.00 | 1.73 | 975 | ▼0.02 |
| Total | 40 | | | | | | 56,404 | |

Note: "Votes" are the first preference votes.

== Districts summary ==
Results of the 2023 Lisburn and Castlereagh City Council election by district
| District Electoral Area (DEA) | % | Cllrs | % | Cllrs | % | Cllrs | % | Cllrs | % | Cllrs | % | Cllrs | Total cllrs |
| District Electoral Area (DEA) | DUP | | Alliance | | UUP | | Sinn Féin | | SDLP | | Independents and others | | Total cllrs |
|---|---|---|---|---|---|---|---|---|---|---|---|---|---|
| Castlereagh East | 50.92 | 3 | 30.78 | 2 | 9.03 | 1 | 0.00 | 0 | 0.00 | 0 | 9.28 | 0 | 6 |
| Castlereagh South | 15.05 | 1 | 32.36 | 3 ▲1 | 7.46 | 0 ▼1 | 21.61 | 2 ▲1 | 17.05 | 1 | 6.92 | 0 ▼1 | 7 |
| Downshire East | 41.34 | 2 | 30.06 | 2 ▲1 | 17.47 | 1 ▼1 | 0.00 | 0 | 4.51 | 0 | 5.73 | 0 | 5 |
| Downshire West | 40.19 | 2 | 36.62 | 2 ▲1 | 17.26 | 1 ▼1 | 4.21 | 0 | 0.00 | 0 | 1.73 | 0 | 5 |
| Killultagh | 33.49 | 2 | 22.22 | 1 | 15.66 | 1 | 23.36 | 1 | 4.34 | 0 | 0.93 | 0 | 5 |
| Lisburn North | 26.47 | 1 ▼1 | 23.61 | 1 | 13.65 | 1 ▼1 | 14.67 | 1 ▲1 | 11.07 | 1 | 10.54 | 1 ▲1 | 6 |
| Lisburn South | 38.20 | 3 | 23.81 | 2 ▲1 | 19.95 | 1 ▼1 | 6.58 | 0 | 6.30 | 0 | 5.16 | 0 | 6 |
| Total | 34.02 | 14 ▼1 | 28.48 | 13 ▲4 | 13.97 | 6 ▼5 | 10.98 | 4 ▲2 | 6.69 | 2 | 5.87 | 1 | 40 |

== District results ==
=== Castlereagh East ===
2019: 3 x DUP, 2 x Alliance, 1 x UUP

2023: 3 x DUP, 2 x Alliance, 1 x UUP

2019–2023 Change: No change

Castlereagh East - 6 seats
| Party | Candidate | FPv% | Count | | | | |
| Party | Candidate | FPv% | 1 | 2 | 3 | 4 | 5 |
|---|---|---|---|---|---|---|---|
| DUP | Sharon Skillen* | 21.04% | 1,655 | | | | |
| Alliance | Martin Gregg* | 17.50% | 1,377 | | | | |
| DUP | Samantha Burns | 11.17% | 879 | 1,165.72 | | | |
| Alliance | Sharon Lowry* | 13.28% | 1,045 | 1,057.16 | 1,192.16 | | |
| DUP | John Laverty* | 11.31% | 890 | 960.72 | 966.68 | 980.62 | 1,130.62 |
| UUP | Hazel Legge* | 9.03% | 710 | 735.28 | 763.92 | 959.08 | 1,086.60 |
| DUP | David Drysdale* | 7.40% | 582 | 678 | 682.96 | 703.70 | 931.76 |
| TUV | Andrew Girvin | 6.79% | 534 | 558.32 | 566.64 | 589.76 | |
| Green (NI) | Terry Winchcombe | 2.49% | 195 | 199.48 | | | |
Electorate: 16,289 Valid: 7,867 (48.30%) Spoilt: 90 Quota: 1,124 Turnout: 7,957 (48.85%)

=== Castlereagh South ===
2019: 2 x Alliance, 1 x DUP, 1 x SDLP, 1 x Sinn Féin, 1 x UUP, 1 x Green

2023: 3 x Alliance, 2 x Sinn Féin, 1 x DUP, 1 x SDLP

2019–2023 Change: Alliance and Sinn Féin gain from Green and UUP

Castlereagh South - 7 seats
| Party | Candidate | FPv% | Count | | | | | | | |
| Party | Candidate | FPv% | 1 | 2 | 3 | 4 | 5 | 6 | 7 | 8 |
|---|---|---|---|---|---|---|---|---|---|---|
| Alliance | Michelle Guy* † | 14.26% | 1,452 | | | | | | | |
| DUP | Brian Higginson | 9.88% | 1,006 | 1,009 | 1,009.60 | 1,507.72 | | | | |
| Alliance | Nancy Eaton † | 10.96% | 1,116 | 1,121 | 1,183.16 | 1,186.16 | 1,188.76 | 1,416.76 | | |
| SDLP | John Gallen* | 10.61% | 1,035 | 1,035 | 1,042.08 | 1,044.08 | 1,046.16 | 1,147.12 | 1,613.12 | |
| Sinn Féin | Ryan Carlin* | 11.82% | 1,204 | 1,207 | 1,213.24 | 1,214.24 | 1,214.76 | 1,260.76 | 1,314.76 | |
| Alliance | Martin McKeever | 7.14% | 727 | 734 | 793.88 | 795.88 | 803.12 | 926.04 | 1,048.76 | 1,269.89 |
| Sinn Féin | Daniel Bassett | 9.79% | 997 | 998 | 1,000.88 | 1,000.88 | 1,000.88 | 1,036.24 | 1,095.60 | 1,192.80 |
| UUP | Michael Henderson* | 7.46% | 760 | 764 | 768.92 | 786.92 | 1,001.68 | 1,039.08 | 1,059.60 | 1,077.42 |
| SDLP | Simon Lee* | 6.44% | 656 | 662 | 683.36 | 686.36 | 688.44 | 761.64 | | |
| Green (NI) | Jacinta Hamley | 6.44% | 656 | 667 | 675.16 | 675.16 | 677.76 | | | |
| DUP | William Traynor | 5.17% | 527 | 528 | 528.18 | | | | | |
| Independent | Andrew Miller | 0.48% | 49 | | | | | | | |
Electorate: 18,120 Valid: 10,185 (56.21%) Spoilt: 95 Quota: 1,274 Turnout: 10,280 (56.73%)

=== Downshire East ===
2019: 2 x DUP, 2 x UUP, 1 x Alliance

2023: 2 x DUP, 2 x Alliance, 1 x UUP

2019–2023 Change: Alliance gain from UUP

Downshire East - 5 seats
| Party | Candidate | FPv% | Count | | | | | |
| Party | Candidate | FPv% | 1 | 2 | 3 | 4 | 5 | 6 |
|---|---|---|---|---|---|---|---|---|
| DUP | Andrew Gowan* | 26.01% | 1,798 | | | | | |
| DUP | Uel Mackin* | 15.33% | 1,060 | 1,576.96 | | | | |
| Alliance | Aaron McIntyre* | 15.94% | 1,102 | 1,123.96 | 1,139.00 | 1,253.00 | | |
| Alliance | Kurtis Dickson | 14.12% | 976 | 981.04 | 985.84 | 1,147.84 | | |
| UUP | James Baird* | 10.50% | 726 | 768.48 | 938.40 | 945.76 | 959.76 | 1,154.76 |
| UUP | Alex Swan* | 6.97% | 482 | 498.92 | 600.36 | 605.36 | 626.36 | 749.36 |
| TUV | Stewart Ferris | 5.73% | 396 | 428.76 | 564.12 | 566.48 | 570.48 | |
| SDLP | John Drake | 4.51% | 312 | 314.52 | 317.08 | | | |
Electorate: 12,763 Valid: 6,914 (54.17%) Spoilt: 62 Quota: 1,143 Turnout: 6,976 (54.66%)

=== Downshire West ===
2019: 2 x DUP, 2 x UUP, 1 x Alliance

2023: 2 x DUP, 2 x Alliance, 1 x UUP

2019–2023 Change: Alliance gain from UUP

Downshire West - 5 seats
| Party | Candidate | FPv% | Count | | | | | |
| Party | Candidate | FPv% | 1 | 2 | 3 | 4 | 5 | 6 |
|---|---|---|---|---|---|---|---|---|
| Alliance | Owen Gawith* | 23.58% | 1,693 | | | | | |
| Alliance | Gretta Thompson | 13.04% | 936 | 1,353.02 | | | | |
| UUP | Alan Martin | 8.69% | 624 | 641.98 | 693.33 | 776.91 | 1,315.91 | |
| DUP | Caleb McCready* | 13.87% | 996 | 1,014.56 | 1,020.85 | 1,032.40 | 1,059.86 | 1,093.46 |
| DUP | Allan Ewart* | 13.53% | 971 | 975.06 | 987.35 | 992.81 | 1,039.51 | 1,082.56 |
| DUP | William Leathem | 12.79% | 918 | 921.48 | 925.48 | 928.21 | 947.26 | 988.56 |
| UUP | Liz McCord | 8.57% | 615 | 621.38 | 691.12 | 739.42 | | |
| Sinn Féin | Siobhán Murphy | 4.21% | 302 | 310.70 | | | | |
| Green (NI) | Luke Robinson | 1.73% | 124 | 135.02 | | | | |
Electorate: 13,284 Valid: 7,179 (54.04%) Spoilt: 72 Quota: 1,197 Turnout: 7,251 (54.58%)

=== Killultagh ===
2019: 2 x DUP, 1 x Alliance, 1 x UUP, 1 x Sinn Féin

2023: 2 x DUP, 1 x Sinn Féin, 1 x Alliance, 1 x UUP

2019–2023 Change: No change

Killultagh - 5 seats
| Party | Candidate | FPv% | Count | | | | | |
| Party | Candidate | FPv% | 1 | 2 | 3 | 4 | 5 | 6 |
|---|---|---|---|---|---|---|---|---|
| Sinn Féin | Gary McCleave* | 23.36% | 1,958 | | | | | |
| Alliance | Claire Kemp | 22.22% | 1,862 | | | | | |
| DUP | Thomas Beckett* | 18.01% | 1,509 | | | | | |
| DUP | James Tinsley* | 15.48% | 1,297 | 1,297.68 | 1,312.26 | 1,325.80 | 1,415.05 | |
| UUP | Ross McLernon* | 7.80% | 654 | 657.74 | 732.80 | 765.65 | 776.78 | 1,398.14 |
| SDLP | Jack Patton | 4.34% | 364 | 888.28 | 1,145.86 | 1,178.05 | 1,178.47 | 1,192.49 |
| UUP | Laura Turner | 7.86% | 659 | 664.10 | 728.63 | 748.84 | 752.69 | |
| Independent | Stuart Brown | 0.93% | 78 | 93.64 | 136.57 | | | |
Electorate: 15,956 Valid: 8,381 (52.53%) Spoilt: 68 Quota: 1,397 Turnout: 8,449 (52.95%)

=== Lisburn North ===
2019: 2 x DUP, 2 x UUP, 1 x Alliance, 1 x SDLP

2023: 1 x DUP, 1 x Alliance, 1 x Sinn Féin, 1 x UUP, 1 x SDLP, 1 x Independent

2019–2023 Change: Sinn Féin and Independent gain from DUP and UUP

Lisburn North - 6 seats
| Party | Candidate | FPv% | Count | | | | |
| Party | Candidate | FPv% | 1 | 2 | 3 | 4 | 5 |
|---|---|---|---|---|---|---|---|
| Sinn Féin | Paul Burke † | 14.67% | 1,239 | | | | |
| DUP | Jonathan Craig* | 14.45% | 1,220 | | | | |
| Alliance | Nicola Parker | 13.47% | 1,137 | 1,147 | 1,900 | | |
| SDLP | Pat Catney | 11.07% | 935 | 941 | 1,002 | 1,360 | |
| UUP | Nicholas Trimble* | 7.43% | 627 | 1,035 | 1,070 | 1,242 | |
| Independent | Gary Hynds | 10.54% | 890 | 933 | 946 | 1,045 | 1,162 |
| DUP | Scott Carson* | 12.02% | 1,015 | 1,049 | 1,053 | 1,066 | 1,071 |
| Alliance | Stephen Martin* | 10.14% | 856 | 874 | | | |
| UUP | Linsey Gibson | 6.22% | 525 | | | | |
Electorate: 16,680 Valid: 8,444 (50.62%) Spoilt: 89 Quota: 1,207 Turnout: 8,553 (51.28%)

=== Lisburn South ===
2019: 3 x DUP, 2 x UUP, 1 x Alliance

2023: 3 x DUP, 2 x Alliance, 1 x UUP

2019–2023 Change: Alliance gain from UUP

Lisburn South - 6 seats
| Party | Candidate | FPv% | Count | | | | | | | |
| Party | Candidate | FPv% | 1 | 2 | 3 | 4 | 5 | 6 | 7 | 8 |
|---|---|---|---|---|---|---|---|---|---|---|
| DUP | Andrew Ewing* | 15.19% | 1,139 | | | | | | | |
| Alliance | Amanda Grehan* | 14.82% | 1,111 | | | | | | | |
| DUP | Alan Givan* | 13.85% | 1,038 | 1,089.60 | | | | | | |
| Alliance | Peter Kennedy † | 8.99% | 674 | 674.24 | 677.30 | 707.33 | 707.55 | 949.27 | 1,324.27 | |
| UUP | Tim Mitchell* | 11.61% | 870 | 871.44 | 962.86 | 963.58 | 965.12 | 971.12 | 1,007.29 | 1,065.29 |
| DUP | Paul Porter* | 9.16% | 687 | 696 | 900.42 | 900.81 | 915.15 | 921.15 | 931.23 | 937.23 |
| UUP | Jenny Palmer* | 8.34% | 625 | 628.42 | 692.90 | 693.59 | 694.27 | 706.42 | 727.48 | 745.48 |
| Sinn Féin | Aisling Flynn | 6.58% | 493 | 493.42 | 494.42 | 494.90 | 494.94 | 671.09 | | |
| SDLP | Dee French | 6.30% | 472 | 472.42 | 476.42 | 477.32 | 477.34 | | | |
| TUV | Stewart McEvoy | 5.16% | 387 | 388.44 | | | | | | |
Electorate: 16,838 Valid: 7,496 (44.52%) Spoilt: 99 Quota: 1,071 Turnout: 7,595 (45.11%)

== Changes during the term ==
=== † Co-options ===
| Date co-opted | Electoral Area | Party | Outgoing | Co-optee | Reason |
|---|---|---|---|---|---|
| 5 August 2024 | Castlereagh South | Alliance | Michelle Guy | Jamie Harpur | Guy was co-opted to the Northern Ireland Assembly. |
| 1 November 2024 | Lisburn North | Sinn Féin | Paul Burke | Declan Lynch | Burke resigned. |
| 21 March 2025 | Lisburn South | Alliance | Peter Kennedy | Jessica Bamford | Kennedy resigned. |
| 29 May 2025 | Castlereagh South | Alliance | Nancy Eaton | Bronagh Magee | Eaton resigned. |
