= 1973 Ards Borough Council election =

Northern Ireland local election

30 May 1973	1977 →

All 17 seats to Ards Borough Council 9 seats needed for a majority
	First party	Second party	Third party
Party	UUP	Alliance	NI Labour
Seats won	11	2	1
	Fourth party	Fifth party	Sixth party
Party	SDLP	Ind. Unionist	Loyalist Coalition
Seats won	1	1	1

Elections to Ards Borough Council were held on 30 May 1973 on the same day as the other Northern Irish local government elections. The election used three district electoral areas to elect a total of 17 councillors.

The elections were the first following the reorganisation of local government in Northern Ireland, brought about by the Local Government (Boundaries) Act (Northern Ireland) 1971 & Local Government Act (Northern Ireland) 1972, which replaced the previous FPTP ward system with a new system of proportional representation using multi-member district electoral areas.

== Election results ==
Party	Seats	±	First Pref. votes	FPv%	±%
UUP	11		11,499	54.5	
Alliance	2		3,133	14.8	
Loyalist Coalition	1		1,608	8.0	
SDLP	1		1,180	5.6	
NI Labour	1		1,114	5.3	
Ind. Unionist	1		895	4.2	
Vanguard	0		1,510	7.2	
Ulster Liberal	0		167	0.8	
Totals	17		21,106	100.0	—

== Districts summary ==
Results of the Ards Borough Council election, 1973 by district
Ward	%	Cllrs	%	Cllrs	%	Cllrs	%	Cllrs	%	Cllrs	Total Cllrs
Ward	UUP		Alliance		NILP		SDLP		Others		Total Cllrs
Area A	67.4	6	10.8	0	0.7	0	14.7	1	6.4	0	7
Area B	48.6	3	15.4	1	13.1	1	1.0	0	22.9	1	6
Area C	45.5	2	19.5	1	0.0	0	0.0	0	35.0	1	4
Total	54.5	11	14.8	2	5.3	1	5.6	1	19.8	2	17

== Districts results ==
=== Area A ===
1973: 6 x UUP, 1 x SDLP

Ards Area A - 7 seats
Party	Candidate	FPv%	Count								
Party	Candidate	FPv%	1	2	3	4	5	6	7	8	9
SDLP	J. B. McPolin	14.68%	1,101								
UUP	Henry Cosbey	12.81%	961								
UUP	John Scott	11.27%	845	845	847.17	854.17	879.51	1,029.51			
UUP	J. Donnan	12.07%	905	906.87	910.55	925.55	937.89	1,020.89			
UUP	T. G. H. Pollock	11.64%	873	873.17	873.51	891.51	904.51	990.51			
UUP	Oliver Johnston	9.59%	719	719.17	722.17	730.34	742.34	814.34	870.58	915.58	944.83
UUP	G. McMordie	10.05%	754	755.02	757.02	760.19	778.7	836.7	871.48	891.48	914.73
Alliance	C. McNamara	4.20%	315	416.49	451.74	510.8	817.24	823.92	823.92	824.92	824.92
Vanguard	R. H. Willis	6.37%	478	478.68	484.19	940.36	492.36				
Alliance	M. Leroux	3.52%	264	268.25	278.25	403.35					
Alliance	William Sheldon	3.07%	230	234.59	249.67						
NI Labour	J. M. Paden	0.73%	55	100.22							
Electorate: 13,393 Valid: 7,500 (56.00%) Spoilt: 92 Quota: 938 Turnout: 7,592 (56.69%)

=== Area B ===
1973: 3 x UUP, 1 x Alliance, 1 x NILP, 1 x Loyalist Coalition

Ards Area B - 6 seats
Party	Candidate	FPv%	Count													
Party	Candidate	FPv%	1	2	3	4	5	6	7	8	9	10	11	12	13	14
UUP	John Algie	19.38%	1,568													
UUP	Cecilia Cooke	11.79%	954	1,120.14	1,120.14	1,130.14	1,146.92	1,228.92								
Alliance	Owen Dorrian	8.26%	668	671.9	719.9	755.9	830.42	835.68	836.59	1,207.59						
UUP	William Spratt	8.80%	712	777.26	777.26	791.26	793.26	949.34	986.65	1,005.69	1,016.89	1,039.62	1,328.62			
Loyalist Coalition	Robert Brown	6.90%	558	573.86	573.86	580.86	581.38	587.9	589.72	593.72	593.88	961.9	1,009.53	1,044.53	1,605.53	
NI Labour	Robert Gaw	7.00%	566	584.46	591.46	630.46	648.72	652.72	652.72	687.93	702.33	712.43	789.12	815.12	858.26	934.26
NI Labour	William Allen	6.09%	493	515.62	522.62	550.88	556.88	562.88	562.88	583.79	593.55	608.75	670.86	699.86	729.73	784.73
Loyalist Coalition	William Hannigan	6.64%	537	541.94	542.2	543.2	546.2	550.72	552.54	554.54	555.98	642.28	674.99	697.99		
UUP	Georgina Foulis	4.59%	371	430.54	430.54	443.8	449.06	512.7	539.09	560.39	570.31	607.3				
DUP	Irene Brown	6.34%	513	533.54	534.54	537.54	540.54	545.54	547.36	550.88	552.64					
Alliance	W. H. Forsythe	4.19%	339	343.68	344.68	354.68	477.68	481.68	484.41							
UUP	H. McGimpsey	4.02%	325	344.76	344.76	349.28	351.28									
Alliance	G. Hirst	2.97%	240	242.34	242.34	254.34										
Ulster Liberal	Albert McElroy	2.06%	167	168.04	182.04											
SDLP	D. G. C. Devaney	0.98%	79	79.26												
Electorate: 13,801 Valid: 8,090 (58.62%) Spoilt: 127 Quota: 1,156 Turnout: 8,217 (59.54%)

=== Area C ===
1973: 2 x UUP, 1 x Alliance, 1 x Independent Unionist

Ards Area C - 4 seats
Party	Candidate	FPv%	Count						
Party	Candidate	FPv%	1	2	3	4	5	6	7
UUP	D. Hamilton	11.69%	645	653	669	973	1,249		
UUP	Hamilton McKeag	13.18%	727	740	777	881	1,201		
Alliance	Jim McBriar	12.36%	682	1,003	1,011	1,037	1,068	1,105.4	
Ind. Unionist	James Caughey	16.23%	895	920	939	969	1,004	1,065.2	1,123.85
Vanguard	W. Crawford	10.75%	593	594	936	953	977	1,022.9	1,060.64
UUP	Harold Porter	10.55%	582	595	605	692			
UUP	J. H. Cromie	10.12%	558	561	572				
Vanguard	D. McCreery	7.96%	439	445					
Alliance	Alice Rudnitzky	7.16%	395						
Electorate: 8,762 Valid: 5,516 (62.95%) Spoilt: 83 Quota: 1,104 Turnout: 5,599 (63.90%)
