= Sorcha Eastwood =

Northern Irish politician (born 1985)

Sorcha Eastwood MP
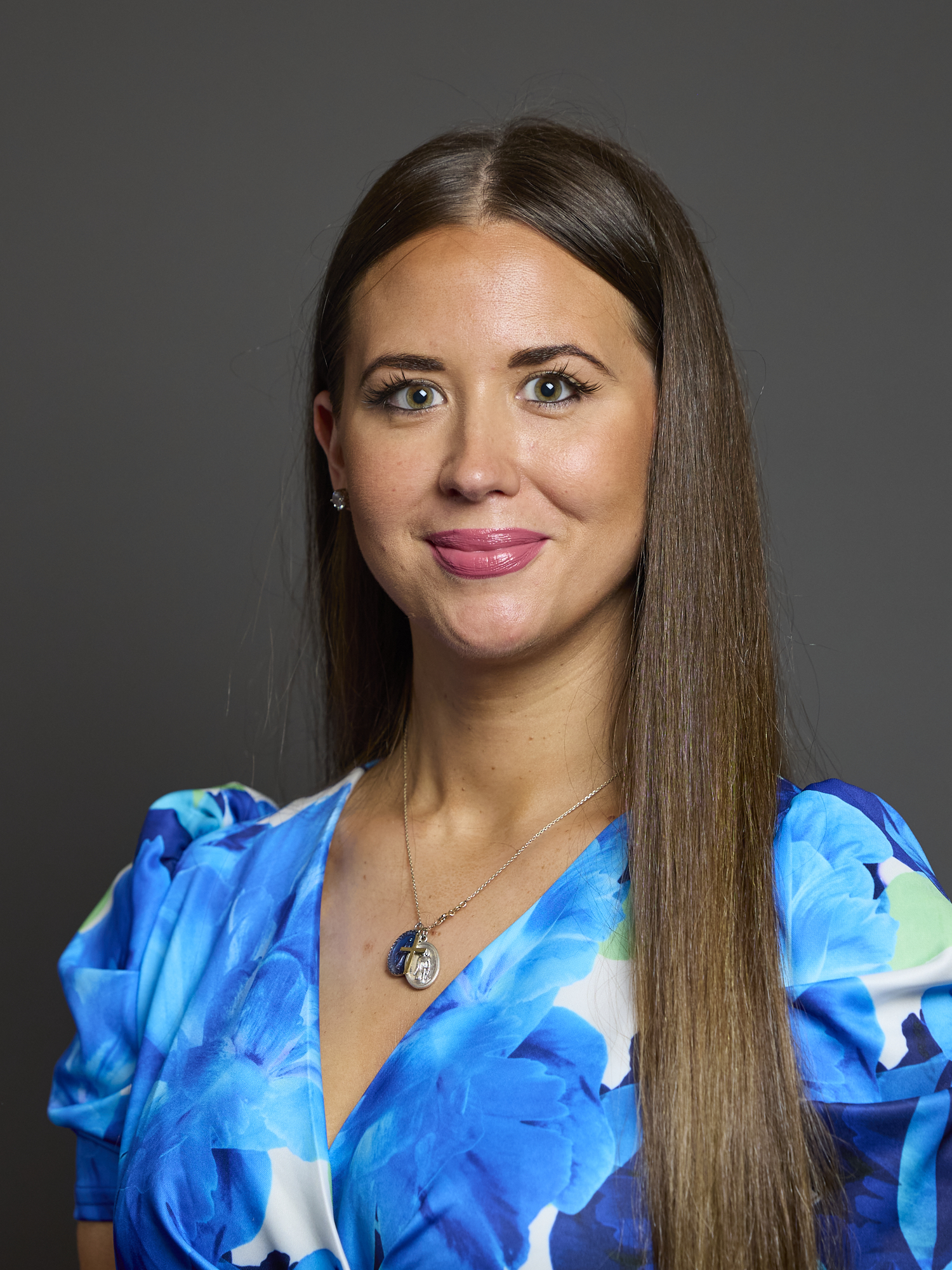
- Official portrait, 2024

Member of Parliament for Lagan Valley
- Incumbent
- Assumed office 4 July 2024
- Preceded by: Jeffrey Donaldson
- Majority: 2,959 (6.0%)

Member of the Northern Ireland Assembly for Lagan Valley
- In office 5 May 2022 – 5 July 2024
- Preceded by: Trevor Lunn
- Succeeded by: Michelle Guy

Member of Lisburn & Castlereagh Council
- In office 7 May 2019 – 5 May 2022
- Preceded by: Geraldine Rice
- Succeeded by: Fiona Cole
- Constituency: Castlereagh South

Personal details
- Born: Sorcha Lucy Eastwood; October 1985 (age 41) Lisburn, Northern Ireland
- Party: Alliance
- Spouse: Dale Shirlow (m. 2017)
- Education: Ulster University (BSc)
- Occupation: Politician

Sorcha Lucy Eastwood is a Northern Irish politician who has served as Member of Parliament (MP) for Lagan Valley since 2024. A member of the Alliance Party, she previously served as a member of the Legislative Assembly (MLA) for Lagan Valley from 2022 until her election to the House of Commons in 2024.

== Early life and education ==
Sorcha Eastwood was born in Lisburn and has lived there her whole life. She has characterised her family as "political but not party political" and "very community-minded". Eastwood describes her father as "a very violent man"; her experiences with domestic violence growing up were one of the factors that inspired her to get involved in politics. Her mother was dyslexic and left school at 15. She also has relatives with other disabilities, which sparked a lifelong interest in disability rights. Eastwood herself suffers from endometriosis.

Eastwood attended St Joseph's Primary School and St Dominic's Grammar School for Girls in Belfast. She studied law and politics for a year at university before dropping out and starting an apprenticeship in retail management at Tesco, becoming one of their youngest store managers on a pilot scheme. She then studied Human Resource Management at Ulster University.

== Political career ==
=== Early career (2017–2022) ===
Sorcha Eastwood ran in the 2017 Northern Ireland Assembly election as an Alliance Party candidate in Belfast West. She received 747 first preference votes and was eliminated on the first count.

She was an Alliance candidate again later that year, this time for the 2017 United Kingdom general election, running in Belfast West. She came 5th, with 731 votes, roughly maintaining Alliance's percentage share of the vote from the previous general election.

She was elected in May 2019 as a councillor on Lisburn and Castlereagh City Council, representing the district electoral area of Castlereagh South. In that election, she topped the poll with 1,629 first preference votes and was elected on the first count.

Later that year, she was the Alliance Party candidate for Lagan Valley in the 2019 general election, polling 28.8% of the vote (an increase of 17.7%), coming second behind the DUP incumbent Jeffrey Donaldson, while reducing his majority from 19,229 to 6,499.

In 2020, Eastwood was awarded compensation after suing a former DUP councillor for accusing her of being an "IRA mouthpiece".

=== Member of the Legislative Assembly (2022–2024) ===
Sorcha Eastwood, alongside David Honeyford, was an Alliance candidate for the 2022 Assembly election in Lagan Valley. She polled 8,211 first preference votes and was elected on the fourth count. She took the seat formerly held by Alliance Party turned Independent MLA Trevor Lunn, who did not run for re-election.

She appeared on BBC Question Time for the first time on 19 October 2023 in Lisburn.

=== Member of Parliament (2024) ===
Eastwood ran again in Lagan Valley at the 2024 general election, winning the seat with 18,618 votes (37.9%), a majority of 2,959 (6.0%). She is the first non-unionist MP to be elected for the constituency.

On 5 November 2024, Eastwood joined the Northern Ireland Affairs Select Committee (NIAC).

In April 2026, Eastwood made multiple speeches in the Commons about the Government's appointment of Peter Mandelson, which were well received and boosted her profile as an MP.

== Personal life ==
On 8 June 2017, Eastwood married Dale Shirlow in Lisburn. With her wedding on the same day as the 2017 UK general election, Eastwood cast an election ballot in her wedding dress.

In 2023, she publicly criticised Belfast City Hospital where her husband was being treated for a rare blood cancer.

Northern Ireland Assembly
Preceded by Paul Givan	Member of the Legislative Assembly for Lagan Valley; 2022–2024	Succeeded by Michelle Guy
Parliament of the United Kingdom
Preceded by Jeffrey Donaldson	Member of Parliament for Lagan Valley; 2024–present	Incumbent
