= 1985 Ards Borough Council election =

Local government election in Northern Ireland

- 15 May 1985

All 20 seats to Ards Borough Council 11 seats needed for a majority
	First party	Second party	Third party
Party	DUP	UUP	Alliance
Seats won	8	6	3
Seat change	▲1	▲3	0
	Fourth party	Fifth party	Sixth party
Party	NI Labour	UPUP	Independent
Seats won	1	1	1
Seat change	0	▼1	▲1
	Seventh party
Party	SDLP
Seats won	0
Seat change	▼1

Elections to Ards Borough Council were held on 15 May 1985 on the same day as the other Northern Irish local government elections. The election used three district electoral areas to elect a total of 20 councillors.

== Election results ==
Ards Borough Council Election Result 1985
Party	Seats	Gains	Losses	Net gain/loss	Seats %	Votes %	Votes	+/−
DUP	8	1	0	▲1	40.0	39.3	8,069	▲2.2
UUP	6	3	0	▲3	30.0	30.5	6,257	▲8.8
Alliance	3	0	0	0	15.0	12.4	2,537	▲0.1
NI Labour	1	0	0	0	5.0	5.6	1,156	▼0.9
UPUP	1	0	1	▼1	5.0	4.9	999	▼8.0
Independent	1	1	0	▲1	5.0	4.1	851	▲0.7
SDLP	0	0	1	▼1	0.0	2.2	448	▼2.1
Labour Party NI	0	0	0	0	0.0	0.8	188	New
Ulster Liberal	0	0	0	0	0.0	0.2	35	▲0.2

Note: "Votes" are the first preference votes.

== Districts summary ==
Results of the Ards Borough Council election, 1985 by district
Ward	%	Cllrs	%	Cllrs	%	Cllrs	%	Cllrs	%	Cllrs	%	Cllrs	Total Cllrs
Ward	DUP		UUP		Alliance		NILP		UPUP		Others		Total Cllrs
Ards Peninsula	31.3	2	27.7	2	10.1	1	0.0	0	13.7	1	17.2	1	7
Ards West	42.9	3	39.3	2	17.1	1	0.0	0	0.0	0	0.7	0	6
Newtownards	44.3	3	25.7	2	10.6	1	16.3	1	0.0	0	3.1	0	7
Total	39.3	8	30.5	6	12.4	3	5.6	1	4.9	1	7.3	1	20

== District results ==
=== Ards Peninsula ===
1985: 2 x DUP, 2 x UUP, 1 x UPUP, 1 x Alliance, 1 x Independent

Ards Peninsula - 7 seats
Party	Candidate	FPv%	Count						
Party	Candidate	FPv%	1	2	3	4	5	6	7
UPUP	Gladys McIntyre*	13.68%	999						
UUP	Robert Ambrose*	11.46%	837	849.4	928.4				
Independent	Thomas Byers	11.07%	808	808.4	826.48	830.56	1,058.56		
Alliance	Kieran McCarthy	6.22%	454	455.76	466	667.92	816.92	944.92	
UUP	John Shields	8.34%	609	625.16	641.28	668.24	669.32	669.32	1,036.32
DUP	Jim Shannon	11.46%	837	844.36	858.32	863.64	863.64	863.64	899
DUP	Oliver Johnston*	11.11%	811	819.8	822.2	823.36	827.36	828.36	867.12
DUP	Joseph Thompson*	8.72%	637	642.68	649.68	651.76	651.84	651.84	672.24
UUP	John Scott*	5.70%	416	428.88	468.8	505.16	505.16	505.16	
SDLP	Patrick Doherty*	4.92%	359	359.24	415.24	419.32			
Alliance	James Muirhead	3.93%	287	292.04	298.44				
UUP	Samuel McKeown	2.16%	158	165.12					
SDLP	Seamus O'Neill	1.22%	89	89.16					
Electorate: 14,998 Valid: 7,301 (48.68%) Spoilt: 220 Quota: 913 Turnout: 7,521 (50.15%)

=== Ards West ===
1985: 3 x DUP, 2 x UUP, 1 x Alliance

Ards West - 6 seats
Party	Candidate	FPv%	Count					
Party	Candidate	FPv%	1	2	3	4	5	6
DUP	Thomas Gourley*	24.29%	1,493					
UUP	Robert Gibson	24.13%	1,483					
DUP	John Hamilton*	9.58%	589	1,040.82				
Alliance	Jim McBriar*	13.00%	799	816.63	851.07	854.37	1,098.37	
UUP	Stanley McCoy	10.27%	631	666.26	801.92	809.72	899.72	
DUP	Bobby McBride	9.08%	558	626.88	658.38	798.93	830.63	860.63
UUP	Trevor Hussey	2.80%	172	187.58	529.46	534.56	625.38	716.38
Alliance	Alan McDowell	4.03%	248	249.23	257.63	257.78		
UUP	Arthur Spence	2.13%	131	135.92	166.58	167.93		
Independent	Johnston Haire	0.70%	43	53.66	70.46	71.06		
Electorate: 12,416 Valid: 6,147 (49.51%) Spoilt: 143 Quota: 879 Turnout: 6,290 (50.66%)

=== Newtownards ===
1985: 3 x DUP, 2 x UUP, 1 x NILP, 1 x Alliance

Newtownards - 7 seats
Party	Candidate	FPv%	Count									
Party	Candidate	FPv%	1	2	3	4	5	6	7	8	9	10
DUP	Simpson Gibson*	22.50%	1,596									
NI Labour	Robert Gaw*	16.30%	1,156									
DUP	John Elliott*	14.47%	1,026									
UUP	Thomas Benson	13.96%	990									
Alliance	Owen Dorrian*	7.74%	549	568.8	638.64	640.07	645.07	666.67	848.2	1,002.2		
UUP	David Smyth	7.29%	517	552.1	595.06	597.79	613.79	641.15	656.35	665.87	678.87	922.87
DUP	William Gilmore	3.41%	242	701.9	741.26	845.65	852.15	859.57	860.63	866.49	869.49	891.94
DUP	Joseph Patterson	3.95%	280	425.35	443.83	458.39	460.79	467.97	470.45	472.65	473.65	489.95
UUP	David Jeffers	3.34%	237	263.1	301.5	307.48	369.38	412.86	420.88	427.76	443.76	
Labour Party NI	Hugh McMullan	2.65%	188	190.25	217.85	217.98	218.18	230.86	235.34			
Alliance	Laurence Thompson	2.82%	200	201.8	214.76	215.15	215.95	219.29				
UUP	James McKernon	1.07%	76	84.1	89.38	90.94	95.24					
Ulster Liberal	Michael McGuigan	0.49%	35	36.35	40.43	40.43	40.83					
Electorate: 15,487 Valid: 7,092 (45.79%) Spoilt: 157 Quota: 887 Turnout: 7,249 (46.81%)
