= Simpson Gibson =

Politician from Northern Ireland (born 1945)

Member of the Legislative Assembly for Strangford
- In office 2 August 2010 – 24 March 2011
- Preceded by: Jim Shannon
- Succeeded by: Mike Nesbitt

Mayor of Ards
- In office 1987–1988

Member of Ards Borough Council
- In office 15 May 1985 – 21 May 1997
- Preceded by: New district
- Succeeded by: George Ennis
- Constituency: Newtownards
- In office 20 May 1981 – 15 May 1985
- Preceded by: William Boal
- Succeeded by: District abolished
- Constituency: Ards Area B

Member of the Northern Ireland Assembly for North Down
- In office 20 October 1982 – 1986
- Preceded by: Assembly re-established
- Succeeded by: Assembly abolished

Personal details
- Born: 10 August 1946 (age 79) Saintfield, Northern Ireland
- Party: Democratic Unionist Party

Hugh John Simpson Gibson MBE (born 10 August 1946) is a Democratic Unionist Party (DUP) politician in Northern Ireland who was a Member of the Legislative Assembly (MLA) for Strangford from 2010 to 2011.

== Background ==
Gibson studied at Saintfield Secondary School and Shaftesbury House Tutorial College, before working as a farmer and becoming a member of the Orange Order. He joined the Democratic Unionist Party (DUP) and was elected to Ards Borough Council in 1981. He held his seat until he stood down in 1997, serving as Mayor of Ards in 1987-88.

At the 1982 Northern Ireland Assembly election, Gibson was elected in North Down. He contested Strangford at the 1983 general election, taking second place, with 30% of the votes cast. In the mid-1990s, he served as Vice-Chairman of the DUP. In August 2010, Gibson was appointed to the Northern Ireland Assembly as the replacement for Jim Shannon. He did not stand in the 2011 Assembly election in which the DUP held three of its four seats, losing Gibson's to the Ulster Unionist Party.

Gibson was appointed Member of the Order of the British Empire (MBE) in the 2015 New Year Honours for political service to the DUP and services to the community in Northern Ireland.

Northern Ireland Assembly (1982)
New assembly	MPA for North Down; 1982–1986	Assembly abolished
Northern Ireland Assembly
Preceded by Jim Shannon	MLA for Strangford; 2010–2011	Succeeded by Mike Nesbitt
