= Jim Shannon =

British politician (born 1955)

Jim Shannon MP
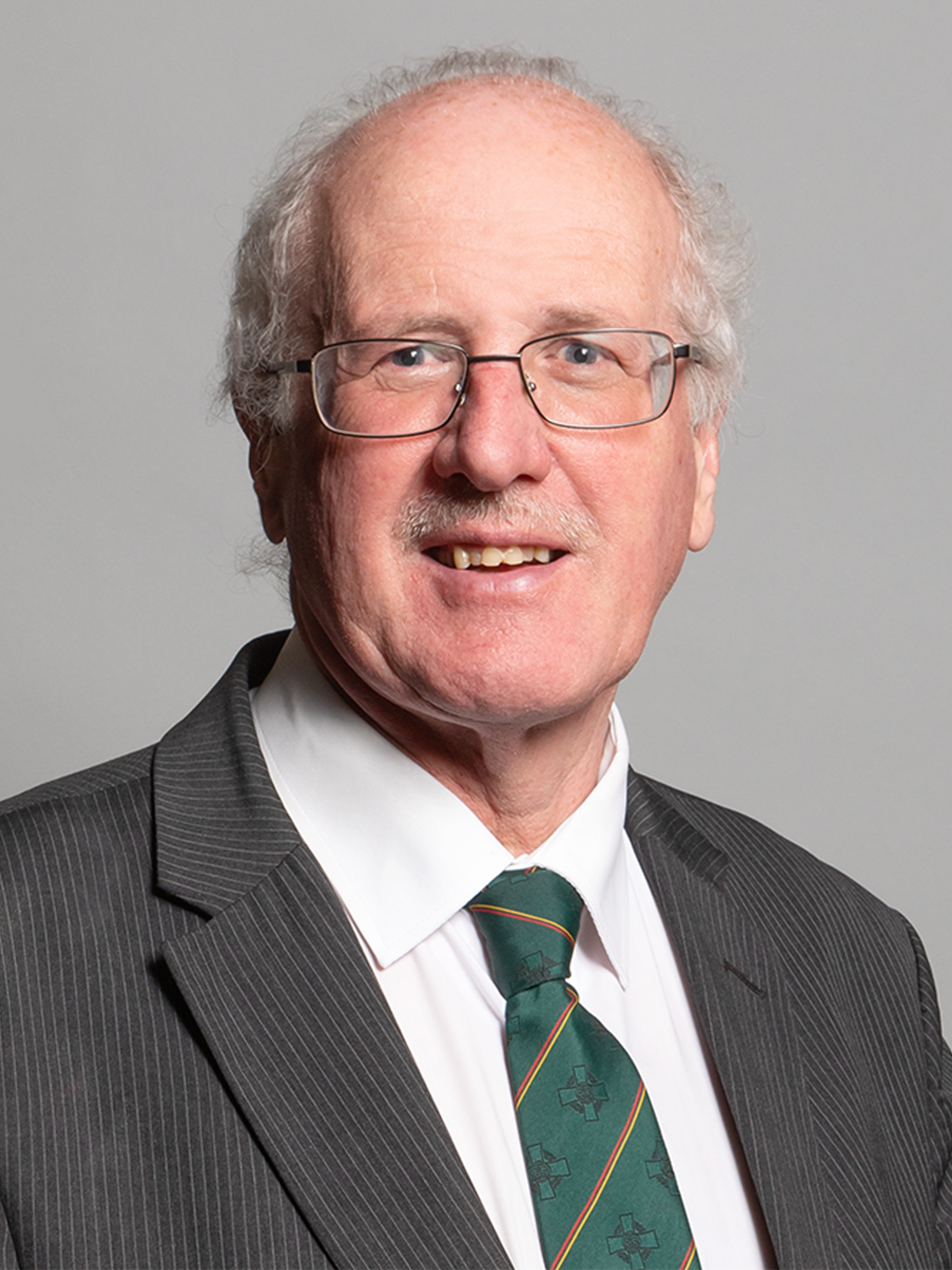
- Official portrait, 2020

Member of Parliament for Strangford
- Incumbent
- Assumed office 6 May 2010
- Preceded by: Iris Robinson
- Majority: 5,131 (13.2%)

Democratic Unionist portfolios
- 2017–present 2012–2015: Human Rights
- 2015–present 2010–2015: Health
- 2015–2017: Equality
- 2015–2017 2010–2015: Transport

Member of the Legislative Assembly for Strangford
- In office 25 June 1998 – 2 August 2010
- Preceded by: Office established
- Succeeded by: Simpson Gibson

Member of the Northern Ireland Forum for Strangford
- In office 30 May 1996 – 25 April 1998
- Preceded by: Office established
- Succeeded by: Office abolished

Local government offices
- 1991–92: 14th Mayor of Ards
- 1990–91: 13th Deputy Mayor of Ards

Member of Ards Borough Council for Ards Peninsula
- In office 15 May 1985 – 5 May 2011
- Preceded by: Office established
- Succeeded by: Robert Adair

Personal details
- Born: Richard James Shannon; 25 March 1955 (age 71) Omagh, Northern Ireland
- Party: Democratic Unionist Party
- Spouse: Sandra Shannon
- Children: 3

Richard James Shannon (born 25 March 1955) is a Northern Irish Democratic Unionist Party (DUP) politician who has served as the Member of Parliament (MP) for Strangford since 2010. He is the DUP's Spokesperson for Health and Human Rights. He had previously sat in the Northern Ireland Assembly from 1998 to 2010 as the Member of the Legislative Assembly of Northern Ireland (MLA) for Strangford.

As the DUP’s Health and Human Rights spokesperson, Shannon is a highly active MP, frequently contributing to parliamentary debates, particularly adjournment debates, to support backbench colleagues. He chairs the All-Party Parliamentary Group on International Freedom of Religion or Belief, advocating for human rights, and has initiated bills on issues like defibrillator access and religious freedom. A vocal Brexit supporter, he has also faced scrutiny for high expense claims, notably £205,798 in 2015, prompting an investigation.

== Personal life ==
Shannon was born on 25 March 1955 in Omagh. He is a member of the Orange Order and Apprentice Boys of Derry. He has been voted "least sexy MP" in a list of all Westminster MPs but laughed off his position at the bottom of the poll. In December 2022, Shannon broke down in tears as he thanked his "long-suffering" wife in the Commons. Shannon lost his mother-in-law to COVID-19 and has previously spoken about her in the House as well.

On 17 August 2026, he was charged with the alleged common assault of a woman in October 2023.

== Military service ==
Shannon served in the Ulster Defence Regiment in 1974–1975 and 1976–1977. He subsequently served over eleven years in the Royal Artillery Territorial Army (TA) and achieved the rank of Lance Bombardier, until he was expelled in May 1989. Two other TA soldiers were also discharged. The expulsions followed the theft of Blowpipe man-portable surface-to-air missile components from the TA base in Newtownards by the loyalist paramilitary group Ulster Resistance. Shannon "came to the adverse notice of the military authorities" after the arrest in February 1989 of a colleague at the Newtownards base, Alan McGrath, who was charged with possession of firearms and explosives at his home. Shannon and the other two soldiers were discharged for ‘their membership of extremist Protestant organisations with paramilitary links’. Shannon was a founder member of Ulster Resistance and also a member of the Ulster Clubs. A colleague stationed at the Newtownards base, Sergeant Samuel Quinn, had been arrested at the Hilton Hotel, Paris in April 1989 attempting to exchange missile technology for guns from South Africa. Two other members of Ulster Resistance, Noel Little and James King, were also arrested. Both men were long-time DUP activists.

Shannon later confirmed that following his dismissal from the Territorial Army he had been questioned by the Royal Ulster Constabulary and released without charge. He suggested that his arrest was "designed to embarrass the DUP" ahead of the upcoming European Parliament election.

== Political career ==
Shannon was a longstanding councillor, first elected to Ards Borough Council in 1985 and serving as Mayor in 1991–1992. He was elected as a member of the Northern Ireland Forum for Political Dialogue in 1996. Shannon was elected to the Northern Ireland Assembly for Strangford in 1998 and then re-elected in 2003 and 2007, representing the DUP.

== Parliamentary career ==
=== 1st term (2010–2015) ===
At the 2010 general election, Shannon was elected to the House of Commons of the United Kingdom as MP for Strangford with 45.9% of the vote and a majority of 5,876. Following his election to Westminster, Shannon resigned his Assembly seat in favour of Simpson Gibson.

=== 2nd term (2015–2017) ===
Shannon was re-elected as MP for Strangford at the 2015 general election with a decreased vote share of 44.4% and an increased majority of 10,185. Shannon was an advocate for Leave Means Leave, a pro-Brexit campaign.

=== 3rd term (2017–2019) ===
At the 2017 general election, Shannon was again re-elected, with an increased vote share of 62% and an increased majority of 18,343.

Shannon was one of the most active contributors to debates in the 2017–2019 Parliament, intervening in almost every adjournment debate, which he says he does to support fellow backbench MPs who wish to raise issues in typically poorly attended debates.

=== 4th term (2019–2024) ===
At the 2019 general election, Shannon was again re-elected, with a decreased vote share of 47.2% and a decreased majority of 7,071.

Since January 2023, Shannon has been a member of the Northern Ireland Affairs Select Committee having previously served on the committee from December 2016 to November 2019 in the previous Parliament.

=== 5th term (2024-) ===
==== 2024 ====
Shannon was again re-elected at the 2024 general election with a decreased vote share of 40% and a decreased majority of 5,131.

On 9 July 2024, Shannon chose to swear his parliamentary Oath of Allegiance in the Ulster Scots dialect after his re-election as an MP. He appeared on BBC Radio 4 saying that he is hoping for a deal from the Labour government that "will free Northern Ireland from the shackles of Europe" on 14 July 2024. Following the State Opening of Parliament on 17 July 2024, he asked the new Prime Minister Keir Starmer to outline exactly what his "10-year plan" will be for Northern Ireland.

==== 2025 ====
On 13 April 2025, Shannon remarked that the "legendary" soldier Paddy Mayne was his hero from “a very early age” and called for a posthumous Victoria Cross (VC) to be awarded to him.

Shannon was sanctioned by Russian President Vladimir Putin and the Kremlin on 23 April 2025. In response, he joked that "the sanction means that my superyacht – I do not have one – cannot be taken to Vladivostok for the summer, so I will have to take it to Ballywalter, the village where I was born [sic] and brought up."

In May 2025, Shannon drew a connection between a general lack of knowledge of the frozen pension policy and the Women Against State Pension Inequality (WASPI) dispute. He warned: "The widespread lack of transparency is reminiscent of the lack of transparency with WASPI women. The all-party parliamentary group on frozen British pensions has reported that nearly 90% of all affected pensioners were unaware of the policy before moving."

=== Expenses ===
In 2015, Shannon was the highest-claiming MP out of 650, claiming £205,798, not including travel. This high figure led to his expenses being investigated.

In 2016, the Independent Parliamentary Standards Authority (IPSA) announced it was launching a formal investigation into Shannon's expenses. IPSA found breaches of the MPs' Scheme of Business Costs and Expenses by his constituency workers for claiming mileage and said £13,925 must be repaid by the MP. The report found no fraud, but stated that Shannon "'still regards himself as a local councillor' and 'needs to let go'".

Northern Ireland Forum
New forum	Member for Strangford; 1996–1998	Forum dissolved
Northern Ireland Assembly
New assembly	MLA for Strangford; 1998–2010	Succeeded by Simpson Gibson
Parliament of the United Kingdom
Preceded by Iris Robinson	MP for Strangford; 2010–present	Incumbent
